= Tin can (disambiguation) =

Tin can may refer to:

- Steel and tin can
- A generic metal can (for example, made of aluminum or using plastic lining instead of tin)
- Tin Can (basketball arena), a historic North Carolina basketball arena
- Tin Can (film), a Canadian movie
- Tin Can (phone), an analog phone for children
- Destroyer in the American naval slang

== See also ==
- Tin Can Alley (disambiguation)
- Tin Can Man (disambiguation)
- Tin Can Beach
