= Stickies (papermaking) =

Tacky substances contained in the paper pulp and process water systems of paper machines

When recycling post-consumer paper, stickies are tacky substances contained in the paper pulp and process water systems of paper machines. Stickies have the potential to contaminate the components either within or around the equipment necessary in the stages of manufacturing that a paper mill follows in its development process, but would have otherwise excluded it in its routine cleaning and maintenance procedures. Contaminations of paper that are classified as tacky are also called stickies. The main sources for stickies are recycled paper, waxes, and soft adhesives.

== Composition ==
Stickies are an indefinite mixture of organic compounds, with the main part being different esters. The components might stem from:

- Printing inks
- Coating binders (synthetic latex)
- Waxes
- Hot melt adhesive and unsupported pressure-sensitive adhesives
- Plastics
- Wet strength resins
- Pitch
- Papermaking additives

== Properties ==
Stickies that pass through a slotted plate screen of 0.10 - 0.15 mm are called micro stickies. Micro stickies can be finely dispersed (100 μm - 100 nm), colloidal (100 - 10 nm) or molecularly dissolved (< 10 nm). Macro stickies are those which are retained as screening residue. The reason for this classification is that macro stickies are easy to remove from the deinked pulp during the deinking process by means of filtration. Micro stickies are transported with the pulp to the paper machine and might agglomerate and cause problematic deposits there.

Stickies often have thermoplastic properties.

Chemical-physical alterations like pH, temperature and charge changes might cause colloidal destabilization and agglomeration of micro stickies.

== Stickies control ==
Several control methods are used:

- Alteration of the physical properties, like using recycling-friendly paper coatings
- Avoidance of troublesome components that cause stickies
- Removal by more effective deinking processes, like improved screening, cleaning, washing and flotation
- Passivation with process additives like fixation agents
- Prevention by washing wires or protecting equipment parts with chemicals.
- Measuring stickies using TAPPI method T274 and T277
