= History of bottle recycling in the United States =

Current container-deposit laws in North America. Container deposits on most bottles and cans Container deposits only on beer/alcoholic beverage containers Container deposits discontinued No container deposits

The history of bottle recycling in the United States has been characterized by four distinct stages. In the first stage, during the late 18th century and early 19th century, most bottles were reused or returned. When bottles were mass-produced, people started throwing them out, which led to the introduction of bottle deposits. However, during the second stage, after World War II, consumption patterns changed and nonreturnable containers became popular, which littered the environment. Some states implemented "bottle bills" that instituted deposits. The beverage-container industry first implemented private recycling programs and then pushed for municipal curbside recycling as an alternative to "bottle bills". More recently, PET bottles have largely replaced other materials. The United States used to be the front-runner when it came to recycling PET, but European countries have since outpaced the US.

== Early history ==
In the United States in the late 18th century, bottles for beer and soda were handmade and filled and were therefore relatively expensive. This meant that most beverages were consumed in restaurants and bars. When consumers would purchase drinks, they would return the bottles or bring their own. Historical research suggests that this system worked because stores were mostly locally owned and small. At the beginning of the 19th century, people still reused bottles many times, also to store homemade drinks and foods. By the end of the century, however, innovation led to bottles increasingly being mass-produced by machines which slowly replaced bottle blowers. Customers started to buy bottled drinks to consume liquor and carbonated beverages at home and bottles were sold in one-serving sizes. Most bottles had an engraving that urged consumers to return the bottles once they were empty: "This bottle to be washed and returned". Bottles were still expensive and manufacturers made a loss if they were not returned. Oftentimes, consumers would just throw bottles out, especially smaller soda bottles, and many bottles ended up being broken or in dumps. By 1910, "twenty glass containers were produced for every person in the United States". The solution to this problem was the introduction of bottle deposits (usually 2 cents), which had first been introduced by beer and soda distributors during the 1870s and 1880s and became more common in the soda industry by the 1920s. The deposit gave consumers an incentive to return the bottle and "defrayed the cost of the bottle when it was not returned". The Great Depression and "materials shortages" during World War II made the deposit system common for milk, beer, and soda bottles. By 1947, bottle loss in the United States decreased to about 3 to 4%. The bottle deposit system was common for beer and soda bottles in the United States until after World War II, when Americans’ consumption patterns changed.

== The rise of nonreturnable bottles ==
The deposit system and returnable bottles started to get replaced by nonreturnable containers. The beer industry was the first to switch to non-returnable containers, which proved difficult at first, because pressure in the can could not release and the metal changed the taste. The first firm to successfully introduce cans was the Gottfried Krueger Brewing Company of Newark, New Jersey in 1935. Since the 12-ounce cans were much smaller and lighter than glass bottles, they could more easily be packaged and transported. However, bottlers soon started selling "one-way" bottles as well. Now, bottles and cans did not have a brand logo anymore, but an engravement that said: "No Deposit, No Return". In the early 1950s, disposable cans and bottles made up 30% of beer that was sold packaged. Technological advances made disposable bottles more prevalent, but social and economic changes were important as well. A reason for the trend toward nonreturnable containers is the fact that Americans’ lives and entertainment habits changed, with more families enjoying drinks and entertainment at home, especially after World War II. The glass and aluminum industries promoted convenience as an important part of modern life and many people started purchasing beverages to drink "on-the-go". The rise of large national soda companies, such as Coca-Cola in the 1920s and 1930s also contributed to the use of non-returnable bottles and cans.

Big "self-serve" supermarkets also began replacing smaller, local stores. These new regional and national grocery stores did not want to deal with a deposit system that was not profitable, took up floor and inventory space. Further, deposit and reusing bottles did not seem to fit with a new shopping mentality that reduced interactions between customers and store owners.

By the 1950s and even more so in the 1960s, more and more consumers became environmentally concerned when they saw that nonreturnable bottles littered the environment. Huge numbers of bottles and cans could be seen along highways and beaches throughout the country. The soda industry began the anti-litter campaign "Keep America Beautiful" in 1953 to teach consumers how to dispose of their single-use containers. The campaign was also intended to divert attention from legislation that would have banned single-use containers or installed deposits and instead focused on educating consumers. In 1971, Oregon became the first state in the US to implement a bottle bill that instituted bottle deposits of 5 cents.

A side-effect of disposable bottles and cans were larger serving sizes. Single-use bottles were at first relatively expensive to produce, which meant that portion sizes became larger. This led to negative health effects for consumers since soda contains large amounts of sugar. Serving sizes increased from 6-7 ounce containers in the 1950s to 12-ounce bottles, which oftentimes seemed to be the smallest serving size available a decade later.

== Private and federal recycling programs ==
In the mid-1960s, when the waste problem was becoming obvious, President Lyndon Johnson advocated for "federal funding for municipal solid-waste programs" and Congress looked at passing legislation to ban nonreturnable containers. By 1976, there were more than a thousand attempts to pass legislation that would ban or tax packaging. Politicians were worried about the costs that resulted from gathering and disposing nonreturnable bottles and cans. However, lobbyists from the beverage-container industry were mostly successful in stopping these bans and bottle bills by arguing that they would hurt sales and lead to job losses. Instead, soft-drink and packaging manufacturers presented recycling as an "industry alternative" to deposit systems. As consumer awareness about the waste problem began to spread, companies such as Coca-Cola and Pepsi pushed for recycling programs in their advertising campaigns (e.g. "Keep America Beautiful") in the early 1970s. However, public support for private recycling initiatives soon faded and many recycling plants had to close because they could not cover the operating expenses.

Besides not making enough money, the recycling programs of the 1970s had low reclamation rates. As for glass containers, in 1972, only 912 million of the 36 billion produced containers ended up in recycling centers. Aluminum reclamation was not more successful either.

To make recycling more effective, federal funding was put into municipal recycling programs. Companies, among them Coca-Cola, testified before Congress and advocated for legislation such as the Resource Conservation and Recovery Act (RCRA). The Act was passed in 1967 and granted more support from the federal government for "local resource reclamation initiatives".

By the end of the 1970s, more and more people paid attention to the landfill crisis and the problem of nonreturnable containers. Several states followed Oregon's example and passed deposit laws. The beverage industry, however, wanted to install curbside recycling programs, since legislation would make producers bear responsibility for the containers they produced. To convince lawmakers to adopt recycling policies, lobbyists argued that recycling would not take away jobs and would be paid for by taxes. Curbside recycling programs became more widespread, and by 1992 there were over 4,000 such programs across the US. Yet, these programs were not profitable and had to be subsidized with taxpayers’ money.

== History of PET bottle recycling ==
The use of PET for soda bottles was first patented by the American mechanical engineer and inventor Nathaniel Wyeth in 1973, and soda companies soon started using it to package their drinks. Over the past 20 years or so, PET bottles have become the most common material to package beverages, replacing glass and metal. Especially water and soda was starting to be packaged in PET bottles. This is because PET has certain material properties that make it more favorable than glass or metal cans. Most importantly, PET is lightweight and difficult to break. Further, PET is clear and has "good barrier properties towards moisture and oxygen". Because of these qualities, PET has replaced glass bottles and metal cans in many instances, with PET bottles also being used for energy drinks, beer, wine, and juice. The introduction of PET bottles marked the final stage in the change away from reusable bottles to "one-way", nonreturnable bottles.

Before PET bottles were recycled to make new bottles, they were often recycled for other uses, such as paintbrush bristles or polyester fiber. Today, many companies, such as Patagonia, make clothing out of old PET bottles. It was at first difficult to recycle post-consumer PET bottles into new bottles because there was not sufficient knowledge about the ways in which PET was possibly contaminated during first use or during recollection. Contamination can occur either when substances from the beverages themselves get absorbed into the container or when bottles are reused to store unsafe liquids such as cleaners or chemicals. However, bottle-to-bottle recycling became more and more common as the number of PET bottles that got produced increased.

PET reclaimers shred plastic bottles into flakes and then wash them, before reselling them as flakes or pellets to be used for new soda bottles or polyester fiber. For bottle-to-bottle recycling, the bottles have to be decontaminated which was achieved by introducing "super-clean recycling processes," which in the US was done for the first time in 1991. These processes clean "recycled PET flakes to contamination levels similar to virgin PET pellets," so that they can be reused as beverage containers.

Around 1990, the US recollected more PET bottles than any other country. However, since then, many European countries have caught up with or outpaced the United States in terms of PET recollection. In 2009, 655.000 tons of post-consumer PET bottles were recollected in the US, with around 55% of those bottles being exported to other countries such as China. It is often cheaper, especially for cities on the West Coast, to send their plastic to China than to domestic reclaimers. As of 2009, 28% of PET bottles got recollected in the US. There are two recollection systems: curbside collection and the deposit system, which in 2009 in the US accounted for 26% and 17% of collected bottles respectively. Today, packaging still makes up most of the municipal waste in the US.

== See also ==
- Plastic bottle
- PET bottle recycling
- Recycling in the United States
- Bottle recycling
