= USPS Post Office Box Lobby Recycling program =

Post Office Box Lobby Recycling program
- Founded: October 28, 2008
- Number of locations: over 8,064 (as of April 2010)
- Area served: United States
- Services: Paper recycling
- Website: Program website

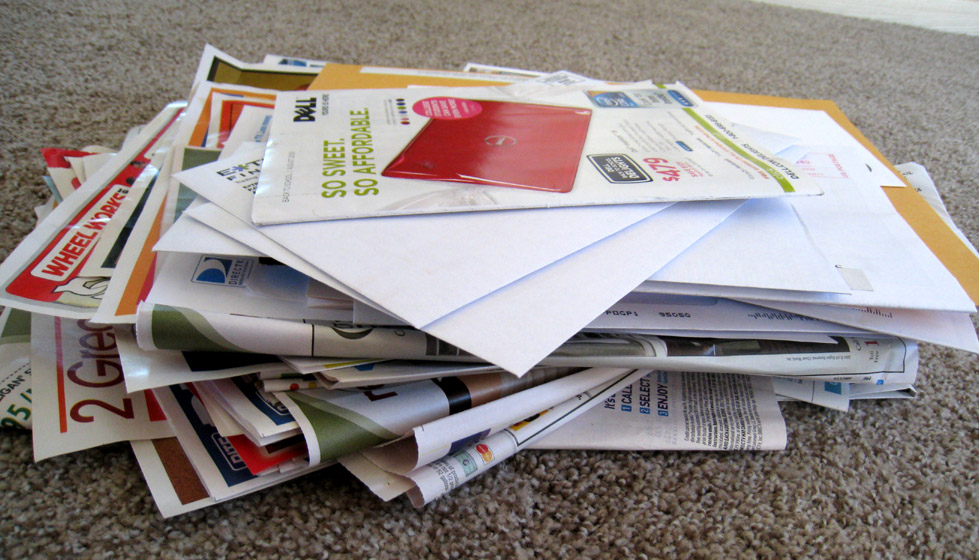
A pile of junk mail

The Post Office Box Lobby Recycling program is a project of the United States Postal Service (USPS) that was created on October 28, 2008, for mail customers to recycle paper items, using recycling bins placed in the customer lobbies of post office buildings. Some of the goals of the program are to reduce the amount of paper waste going to landfills, which helps to reduce the consumption of fiber from trees used for paper production and greenhouse gas emissions associated with waste disposal. USPS receives revenue from selling the material, and no tax dollars are used to fund the project. USPS was reported as having recycled over 200,000 short tons (180,000 tonnes) of waste in 2009, including paper, plastics and other waste.

== Participation ==
As of 2010, some U.S. post offices do not participate in the program, and sometimes recycle paper items independently of the program, such as in bins in their employee work areas. Some reasons for non-participation are building space constraints and limited personnel at some U.S. post offices. At some post offices, mail received that cannot be delivered is recycled.

== Timeline ==
In March 2009, the total number of bins was increased by 1,844, to a total of nearly 5,900 recycling bins.

In April 2010, it was reported that the number of post offices participating in the program had increased to 8,064.

== Security ==
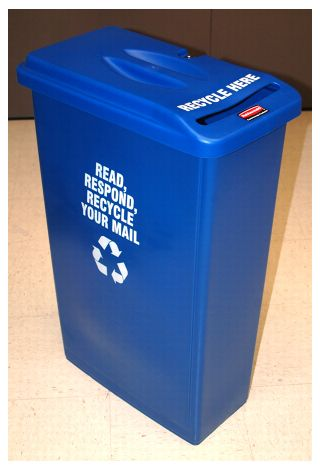
USPS "Slim Jim" recycling bin for unwanted mail

The program uses 23-US-gallon (87 L)-capacity plastic bins, which USPS refers to as "Slim Jims". The bins have lockable lids and have a narrow insertion slot to maintain customer privacy and limit the potential of discarded mail being stolen for the harvesting of personal information.

== See also ==
- Environmental issues in the United States
- Paper recycling
- Recycling in the United States
- Waste minimisation
