= Tin Can Alley =

Tin Can Alley may refer to:

- Tin Can Alley (game), a toy and British carnival game
- Tin Can Alley (album), by Jack DeJohnette
- Tin Can Alley, Kentucky, an unincorporated community in Harlan County

== See also ==
- Tin Pan Alley, a collection of music publishers and songwriters in New York City
