= Tin Can Beach =

Tin Can Beach can refer to:

- A nickname for a section of Bolsa Chica State Beach, California
- A nickname for a section of Huntington State Beach, California
- A 1968 single by The Bonniwell Music Machine

== See also ==
- Tin Can Bay, Queensland
