= Tin Can Alley, Kentucky =

Unincorporated community in the United States

- Unincorporated community
- Location within Kentucky
- Coordinates: 36°51′35″N 83°15′12″W
- Country: United States
- State: Kentucky
- County: Harlan
- Elevation: 1,230 ft (370 m)
- Time zone: UTC-5 (Eastern (EST))
  - Summer (DST): UTC-4 (EDT)
- Area code: 606
- GNIS feature ID: 2565838

Tin Can Alley was an unincorporated community in Harlan County, Kentucky, United States.
