= Recycling in the United States =

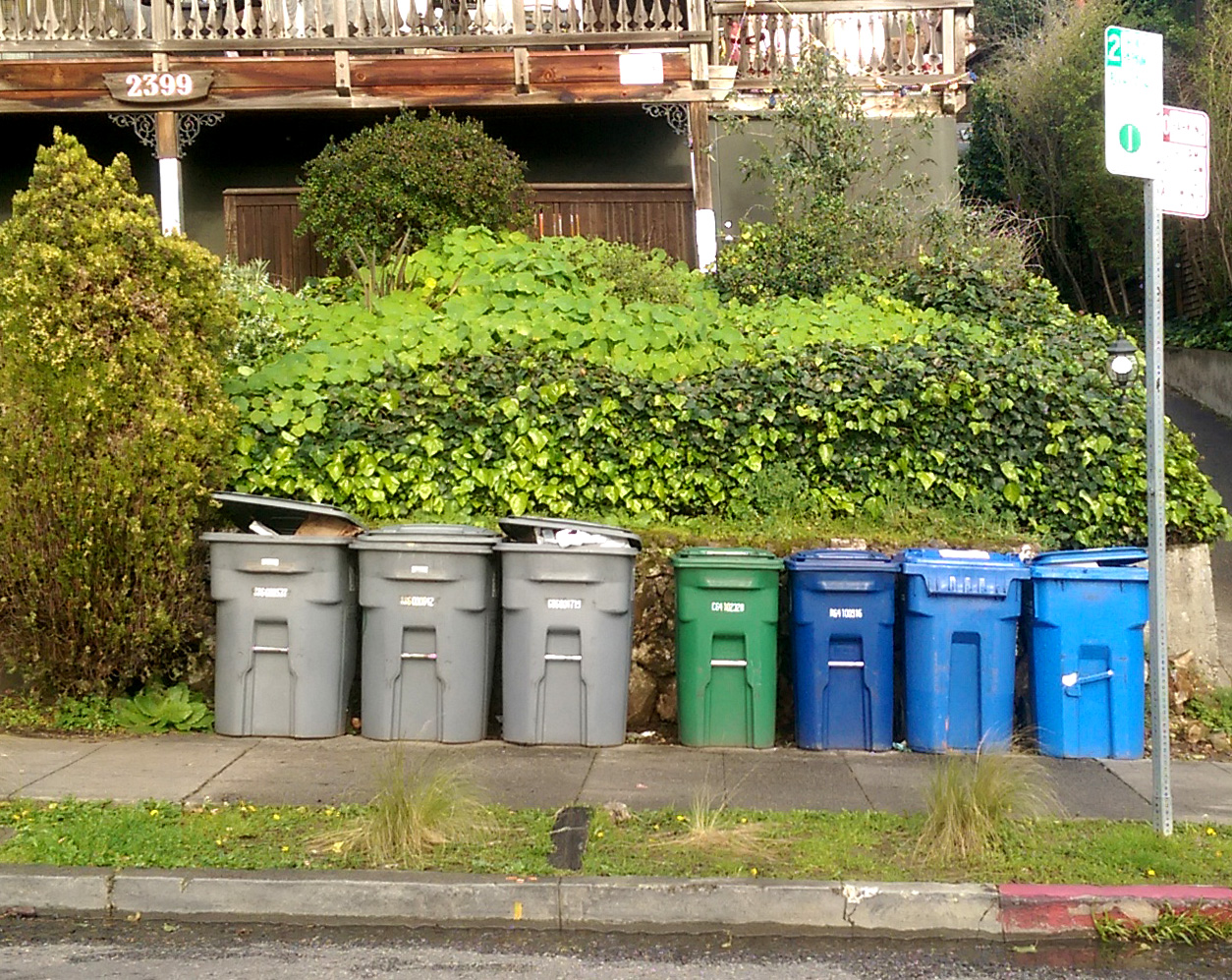
An example of a curbside recycling system in Berkeley, California.

There is no national law in the United States that mandates recycling. State and local governments often introduce their own recycling requirements. In 2014, the recycling/composting rate for municipal solid waste in the U.S. was 34.6%. A number of U.S. states, including California, Connecticut, Delaware, Hawaii, Iowa, Maine, Massachusetts, Michigan, New York, Oregon, and Vermont have passed laws that establish deposits or refund values on beverage containers while other jurisdictions rely on recycling goals or landfill bans of recyclable materials. Recent data has shown that despite expanded recycling programs, the United States recycles only a small fraction of its plastic waste. A 2023 analysis found that less than 6% of post-consumer plastics were actually recycled, with the majority ending up in landfills or incineration facilities.

== National legislation ==
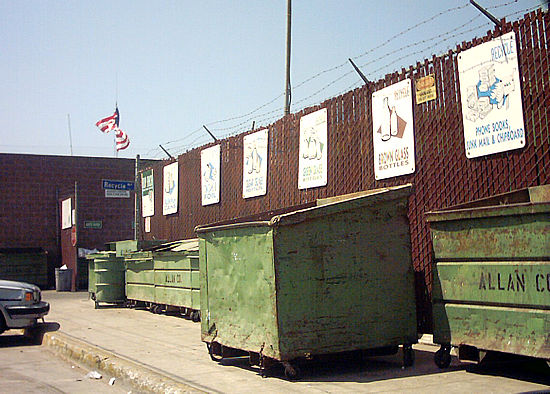
A collection center for recyclables in Santa Monica, California

On a national level, the United States Environmental Protection Agency (EPA) oversees a variety of waste issues under the mandate of the Resource Conservation and Recovery Act. These include regulation of hazardous wastes, landfill regulations, and setting recycling goals.

The Department of Commerce is also responsible for helping to develop markets for recycled goods.

== State and local legislation ==
More specific recycling legislation is localized through city or state governments. State regulation falls into two major categories: landfill bans and recycling goals. Landfill bans make it illegal to dispose of certain items in a landfill. Most often these items include yard waste, oil, and recyclables easily collected in curbside recycling programs. States with landfill bans of recyclables include Wisconsin, California, Minnesota, Michigan, and North Carolina. Other states focus on recycling goals. These include California and Illinois. One way in which some states encourage recycling of specific drink containers is through the passage of a bottle bill.

A number of U.S. states, such as California, Hawaii, Oregon, Connecticut, Delaware, Maine, Vermont, Massachusetts, Iowa, Michigan, and New York, have passed laws that establish deposits or refund values on beverage containers in order to promote reuse and recycling. Most are five cents per can or bottle.Michigan's has maintained a 10 cent deposit value for bottles and cans since 1976.

=== Mandatory recycling ===
Some cities, such as Seattle, and states like Connecticut, have created mandatory recycling laws that may fine citizens who throw away a certain percentage of recyclable materials in their garbage waste. Vermont also employed a landfill ban of recyclable materials, food and yard waste, and wood. There are also voluntary programs and educational programs to increase recycling where it is not mandated by law.

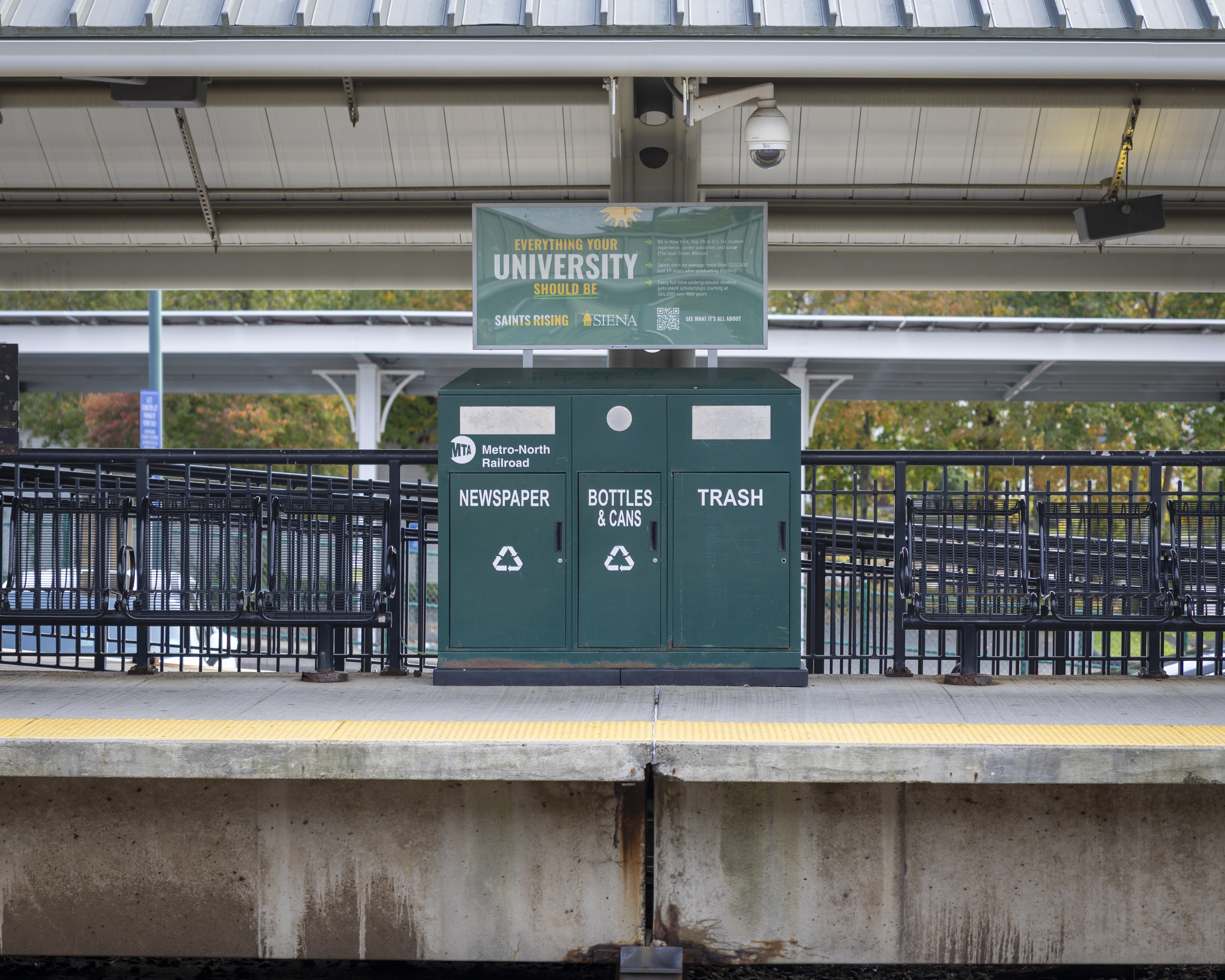
Recycling bins at Milford station in Connecticut

Disposal of recyclables in the garbage is not allowed from households, businesses, and apartments. For businesses, that would include prohibiting discarding cardboard, paper, and yard waste in the trash. For apartments and houses, disposal of glass, paper, cardboard, aluminum, and plastic in the garbage would not be allowed. With businesses and apartments, if garbage collectors find more than 10 percent of the container filled with recyclables, they will leave a tag. After a third instance, the business or apartment tenants will receive a $50 fine. However, households do not face the risk of being fined. If trash collectors find over 10 percent of their garbage contains recyclables, they will leave a tag asking the household to separate the garbage and recyclables for collection the following week.

=== Criticism of mandatory recycling ===
In a 1996 article in The New York Times, John Tierney claimed that government mandated recycling wastes more resources than it saves. Tierney's article received a referenced critique from the Environmental Defense Fund, which noted that "the article relied heavily on quotes and information supplied by a group of consultants and think tanks that have strong ideological objections to recycling or a vested financial interest in opposing it".

In 2003, Daniel K. Benjamin (a professor of economics at Clemson University) published a paper through the Property and Environment Research Center that reiterated many of the points brought up in the New York Times article, backing them up with a detailed inquiry into the recycling industry of the US. In 2010, he followed up on that with an updated look into the recycling policies of the US, finding that not much has changed. After the government of China restricted imports of U.S. waste in 2017, prices fell. The Atlantic reports, for example, that one town which in the early 2000's could break even on recycling by selling it for $6/ton found that 15 years later it had to pay $125 a ton to recycle, versus $68 a ton to incinerate.

== Business process ==
Recycled materials are collected from various streams such as household and industrial waste – sometimes as part of a single stream – and then delivered to a material recovery facility. Once collected, the facility will market and sell the waste as a feedstock for various products. Notable companies involved in the waste collection and processing industry in the United States include Waste Management and Republic Services. In some cases the waste management is handled by a local government agency.

== Recycling status ==
=== Recycling statistics ===
==== 2008 ====
- 251 million – tons of trash
- 82 million – tons of materials recycled
- 53.4 – percentage of all paper products recycled
- 32.5 – percentage of total waste that is recycled
- 100 – approximate percentage of increase in total recycling during the past decade
- 8,660 – number of curbside recycling programs in 2006
- 8,875 – number of curbside recycling programs in 2003
- 95 – percentage of energy saved by recycling an aluminum can, compared with manufacturing a new one
- 4.6 – pounds of trash per person per day (most in the world)
- 1.5 – pounds of recycled materials per person per day

==== 2014 ====
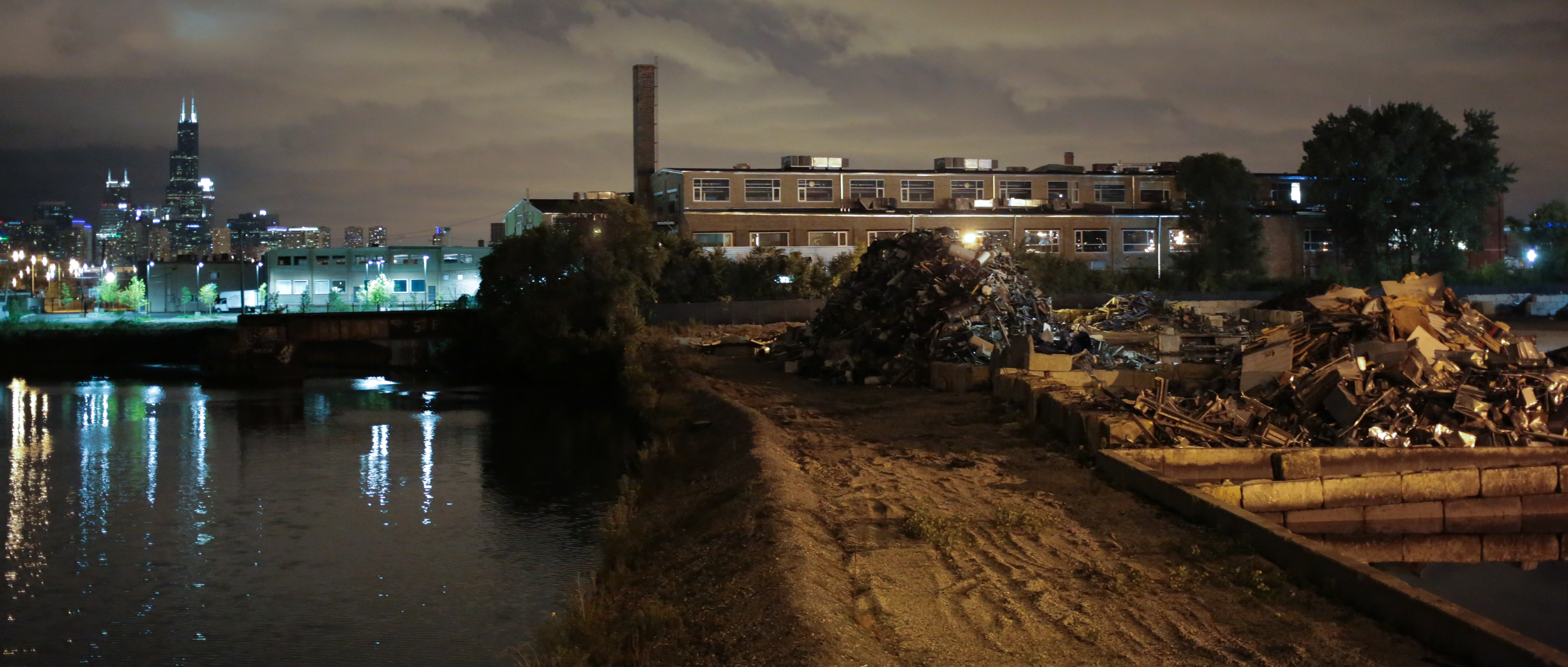
Recycling materials waiting to be barged away on the Chicago River

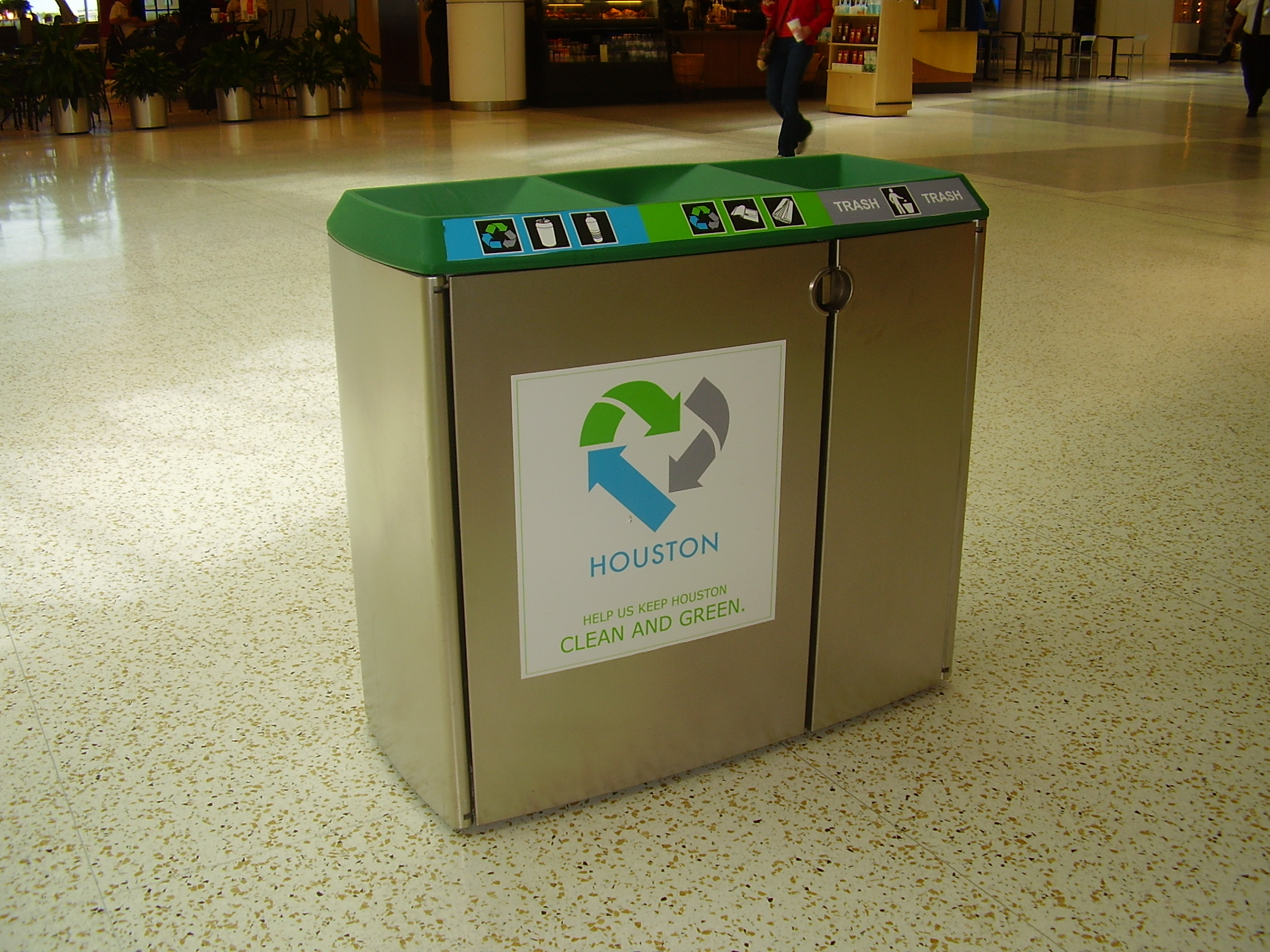
Trash and recycle bin at George Bush Intercontinental Airport

Recycling statistics (ca. 2014) with similar numbers as of 2015

- An average of approximately 258 million tons of trash is generated by the United States in 2014
  - 34.6% was recycled
  - 12.8% was combusted for energy recovery
  - 52.6% was landfilled
- 4.4 pounds (2.0 kg) of trash is generated per capita per day in the United States

==== Recyclables in the landfill ====
The New York Times reported in May 2018 that in some cases, 25% of all recyclables collected are sent to landfill. Contamination can occur from unwashed plastics and greasy cardboard or paper items. If materials are not clean they are sent to landfills.

=== Recycling by material type ===
Recycling rates vary by material and product type. According the EPA in 2014:

- 64.7% of Paper
- 33.0% of Steel
- 26.0% of Glass
- 19.8% of Aluminum
- 9.5% of Plastics

==== Clothing ====
In the United States, a clothing item in good condition can be resold in a used goods or consignment shop. Items of lesser quality condition can be in some cases be recycled. The Salvation Army recycles clothing unfit for their thrift stores. In 2017, The Salvation Army recycled 27 million pounds of material in just 7 months which generated $6.6 million to fund their projects.

==== E-waste ====
Electronic waste or e-waste describes discarded electrical or electronic devices. Used electronics which are destined for reuse, resale, salvage, recycling, or disposal are also considered e-waste. Informal processing of e-waste in developing countries can lead to adverse human health effects and environmental pollution.

Electronic scrap components, such as CPUs, contain potentially harmful components such as lead, cadmium, beryllium, or brominated flame retardants. Recycling and disposal of e-waste may involve significant risk to workers and communities in developed countries and great care must be taken to avoid unsafe exposure in recycling operations and leaking of materials such as heavy metals from landfills and incinerator ashes.

According to the Environmental Protection Agency (EPA), it is important to dispose of electronics via recycling because,"Electronic products are made from valuable resources and materials, including metals, plastics, and glass, all of which require energy to mine and manufacture. Donating or recycling consumer electronics conserves our natural resources and avoids air and water pollution, as well as greenhouse gas emissions that are caused by manufacturing virgin materials." Consumer recycling options include donating equipment directly to organizations in need, sending devices directly back to their original manufacturers, or getting components to a convenient recycler or refurbisher.

Home appliances such as air conditioners and refrigerators can also be recycled at a local dump.

==== Food ====
Americans waste an incredible amount of edible food which also results in additional ecological issues. Unlike France or Italy, the United States has not developed or passed legislation to ensure that a supermarket discarding edible food would be a crime. However, there is some level of food redistribution that occurs in the United States through non-profits such as The Farmlink Project.

==== Tires ====
The Environmental Protection Agency reports 290 million scrap tires were generated in 2003. Of the 290 million, 45 million of these scrap tires were used to make automotive and truck tire re-treads. In 2017, 287 million were generated, 38 million reused and 249 million scrapped. With landfills minimizing their acceptance of whole tires and the health and environmental risks of stockpiling tires, many new markets have been created for scrap tires. Growing markets exist for a majority of scrap tires produced every year, supported by state and local government. Tires are also often recycled for use on basketball courts and new shoe products.

Tires are not desired at landfills, due to their large volumes and 75% void space, which quickly consumes valuable space. As of 2017, 40 states banned whole tires from landfills, 38 allowed shredded tires, 24 allowed processed tires in mono-fills. Fees are collected by 37 states.

In 2017, 81.4% of scrapped tires were marketed for some beneficial use, down from 87.9% in 2015. Of the 3,411 thousand tons of marketed scrap tires, 50.8% were used as fuel, 29.6% as ground rubber. Of the tires used as fuel, 46% were consumed in cement kilns, 29% in pulp and paper mills and 25% in electric utility boilers.

The United States has decreased the number of waste tires in storage from about 1 billion in 1992, down to 60 million tires in 2017, primarily due to state scrap management programs. Most of the remaining stockpiles are in Colorado and Texas.

==== Water ====
In the United States water is recycled. Sewage treatment is used to convert wastewater into potable water. In California, a treatment plant called “Sunnyfields” could process 5.7 million gallons per day in 2023.

==== Wood ====
In the United States, major retailers often sell furniture including shelves, computer desks, dressers, and entertainment centers which are made of particle board. The particle board is primarily manufactured overseas and is made of wood by-products such as sawdust or woodchips combined with resin.

Local government

US state laws and regulations dealing with scrap tires are currently enacted in 48 states. Here are some common features of state programs that deal with scrap tires: source of funding for the program; licensing or registration of scrap tire haulers, processors, and end users; manifests for scrap tire shipments; limitations on who may handle scrap tires; financial assurance requirements for scrap tire handlers; and market development activities. Some state programs are now supported by fees charged to the consumer at purchase or disposal of each tire. These fees, sometimes called “tipping fees”, help to support recycling costs. When the disposal rates charged to consumers are set high, this, in turn, discourages landfill disposal, a simple solution encouraging more affordable tire recycling programs.

== Chinese recycling industry restrictions ==
For most of the early twenty-first century, China was the main destination for the world's waste material. This resulted from a combination of factors, including the growing need for metal, paper and plastics in China's expanding industry, lax environmental regulations, cheap labor, and inexpensive shipping using containers that would otherwise be returned to China empty. In the United States, this resulted in a strong market for many scrap commodities and allowed local recycling programs to come close to breaking even economically or even to turn a small profit.

That situation abruptly changed in 2017 when China announced its ‘’’National Sword’’’ program which banned many scrap imports and imposed strict quality standards on others, starting in February 2018. Acceptable limits for contamination in imported waste were cut from 5-10 percent to 0.5 percent. Since then almost no plastic scrap has been exported to China from the United States and shipments of metal and paper scrap have been sharply reduced. Scrap plastic imports dropped from 3.5 million metric tons in 2017 to 21,300 metric tons in the first half of 2018. As a result, scrap prices in the US have plummeted. The US recycling industry is responding by investing in better sorting equipment to attempt to meet the National Sword standards and by developing new market for waste materials both within the US and in other countries, including Southeast Asia and India. However several countries in Southeast Asia have announced their own restrictions on recycling.

== Early history ==
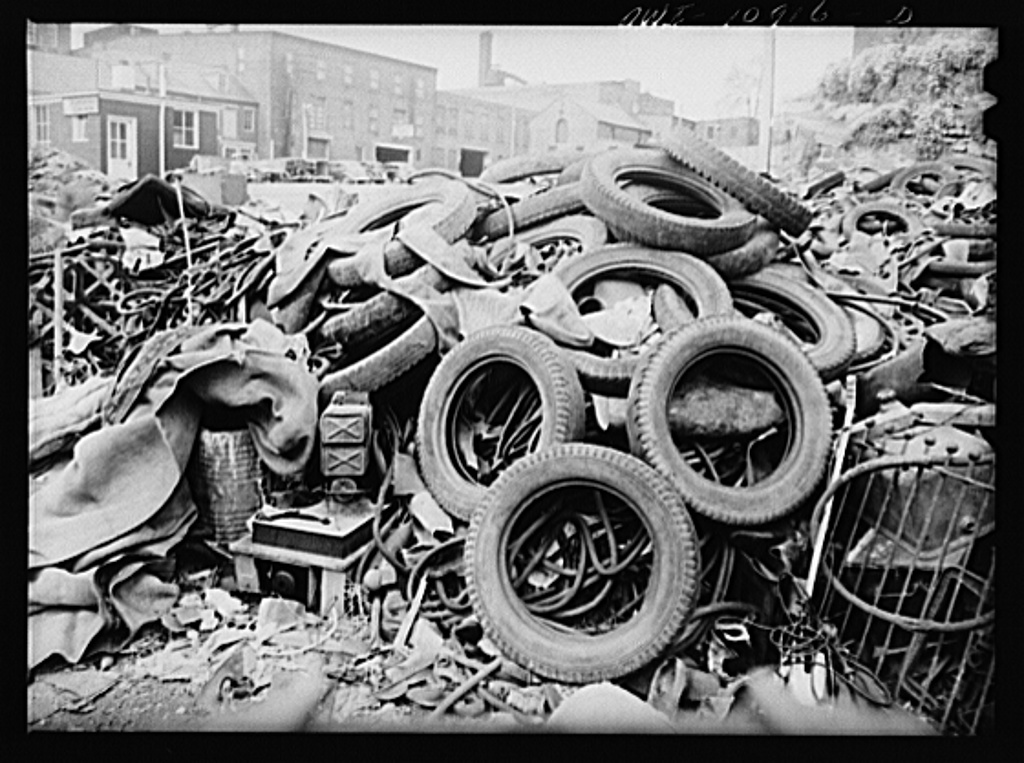
Old tires collected in Lancaster, Pennsylvania

The first post- World War II mass recycling program in the United States, "Ban The Can," was conceived and executed in 1970 by Ruth "Pat" Webb in Honolulu, Hawaii. Webb organized military and civilian volunteers to collect over 9 tons (8,200 kg) of metal cans from the roadways and highways of Oahu. The metal cans were later recycled into steel reinforcement bars to be used in local construction projects.

The Stanolind Recycling Plant was in operation as early 1947. Another early recycling mill was Waste Techniques, built in Conshohocken, Pennsylvania in 1972. Waste Techniques was sold to Frank Keel in 1978, and resold to BFI in 1981. Woodbury, New Jersey, was the first city in the United States to mandate recycling. Led by Donald Sanderson who was President of Woodbury City Council and Woodbury Recycling Committee in the early 1970s, the idea of towing a "recycling" trailer behind a waste management vehicle to enable the collection of trash and recyclable material at the same time emerged. Other towns and cities soon followed suit, and today many cities in the United States make recycling a requirement.

In 1987, the Mobro 4000 barge hauled garbage from New York to North Carolina; where it was denied. It was then sent to Belize, where it was denied as well. Finally, the barge returned to New York and the garbage was incinerated. The incident led to heated discussions in the media about waste disposal and recycling. The incident is often referred to as igniting the recycling "hysteria" of the 1990s.

== Recycling education ==
Integrating recycling into K-12 educational system has become a goal for many educators. Usually, it is integrated into science or social studies classrooms. This is due to its inclusion in the national education standards for both of these subject areas. Common areas that recycling is integrated into the curriculum include areas such as the study of natural resources, general environmental units, soil units, water units, community units, economic units, and geography units. Although interest is growing, major textbook publishers do not always include recycling in a textbook so teachers are left to supplement the textbooks with outside curriculum to meet the national standards. For example, in a unit about trees or natural resources teachers could include a supplemental curriculum about recycling because in the textbook it is never explicitly covered.

Non-profit organizations as well as governmental organizations have created supplemental curriculum for teachers to fill this void. Some purely non-profit groups include the Center for a New American Dream and Be SMART. Other creators of curriculum include governmental offices. Some of these include Oregon, California, and Waukesha County, Wisconsin. Also, some non-profit organizations have partnered with sections of the government to collaborate on educational materials. For example, the Keystone Center partnered with the United States Department of Energy and the National Energy Technology Laboratory to create curriculum on global warming.

=== America Recycles Day ===
America Recycles Day (ARD) is the only nationally recognized day dedicated to encouraging Americans to recycle and buy recycled products. ARD is celebrated annually on November 15. The World Recycling Day is celebrated in most countries, though falls on July 8. Thousands of events are held across the U.S. to raise awareness about the importance of recycling and to encourage Americans to sign personal pledges to recycle and buy products made from recycled materials.

Started by the recycling sector organization National Recycling Coalition in 1997, America Recycles Day has been a program of the national nonprofit Keep America Beautiful since 2009. As the managing entity of America Recycles Day, Keep America Beautiful provides promotional and marketing support and resources to a network of local event organizers. It is sponsored by private and public entities and the EPA.

Although America may not enjoy much of a reputation for environmentalism on the global stage, in some US cities, recycling levels are much higher than, for example, in the UK.

== See also ==
- Container-deposit legislation in the United States
- Environment of the United States
- Environmental issues in the United States
- Keep America Beautiful
- ecycler
- Resin identification code (plastic recycling numbers)
- USPS Post Office Box Lobby Recycling program
- History of bottle recycling in the United States
