= Justus Claproth =

German jurist and inventor

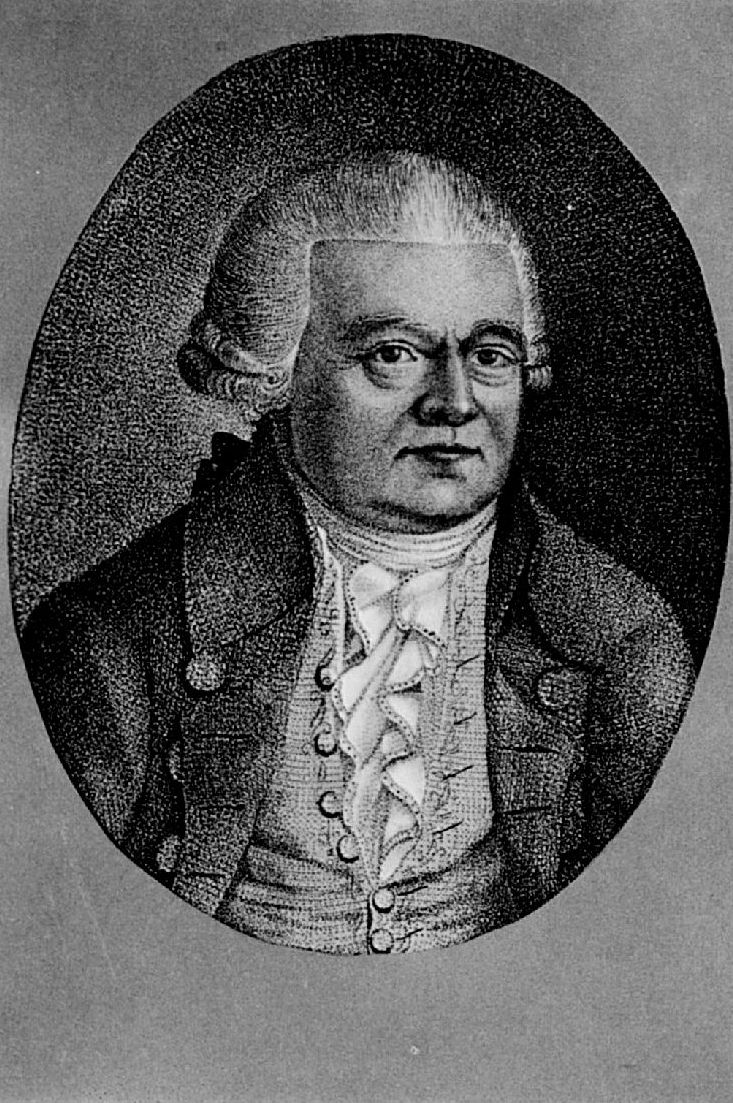
- Born: 28 December 1728
- Died: 20 February 1805 (aged 76)
- Occupations: Jurist, inventor

Justus Claproth (28 December 1728 – 20 February 1805) was a German jurist and inventor of the deinking process of recycled paper.

== See also ==
- German inventors and discoverers
