= Roll hardness tester =

A roll hardness tester is a device to measure the roll hardness, hardness profile and hardness variation of paper rolls.

== Method ==
In the preparation phase, the plunger, guide bar and guide disk are pushed forward by the compression spring. At the end of the movement the hammer mass is hooked by the pawl. During the loading phase the hammer is pushed towards the surface in a controlled movement. The hammer mass remains locked in place by the pawl. This has the effect of stretching the impact spring to put it under tension. Impact Rebound: At the very end of the movement, the pawl spring releases the hammer mass. The impact spring contracts causing the hammer mass to strike against the plunger. This is the impact. The hammer mass then rebounds back to the body of the hammer and distance travelled is recorded on the scale. The rebound distance depends directly on the hardness of the roll under test: A softer roll will absorb more of the impact energy and the rebound distance will be less. A harder roll will reflect more of the impact energy and the rebound distance will increase.

== Standards ==
- TAPPI T 834 om-07: Determination of containerboard roll hardness
- TAPPI TIP 1004-01: TAPPI Roll Number for inventory/tracking systems and bar codes

== Application ==
Roll hardness is one of the most important parameters when deciding whether a paper roll is good or bad. A roll that is wound too softly can go out of round when handled. A roll that is wound too hard, on the other hand, can crack during transportation. These variations are difficult to detect. Above all, it is typically the variation in hardness across a given roll that relates most directly to such converting issues with soft edges being perhaps the biggest contributor.

== See also ==
- Paper mill
- Pulp (paper)
- Tablet hardness testing
