= Deckle edge =

Feathery edge used on paper

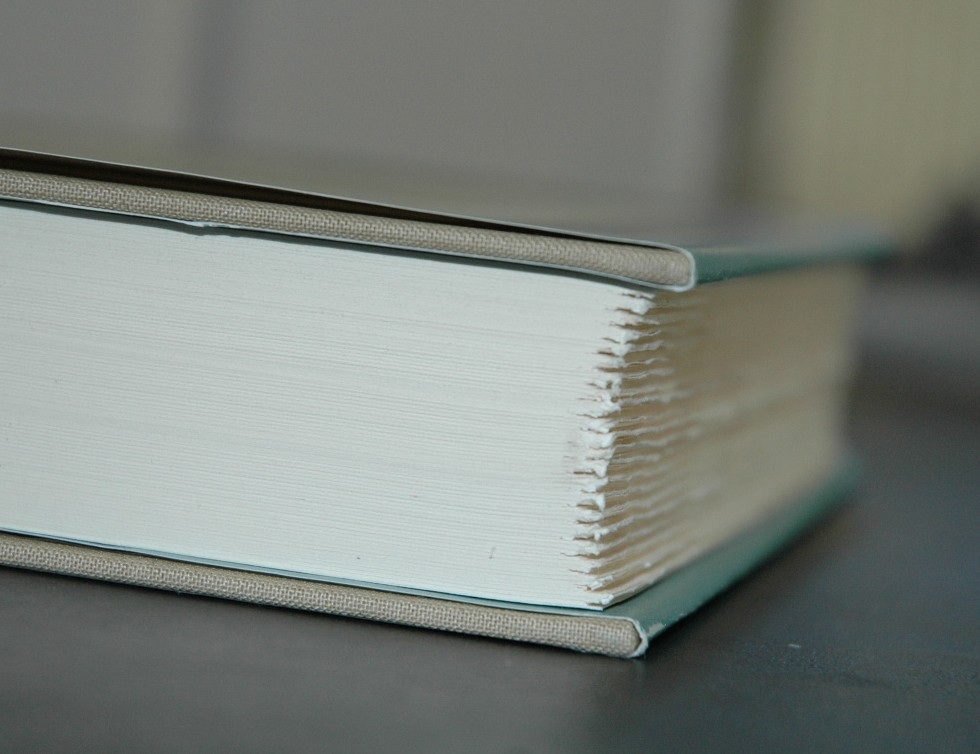
A book with deckle edged pages

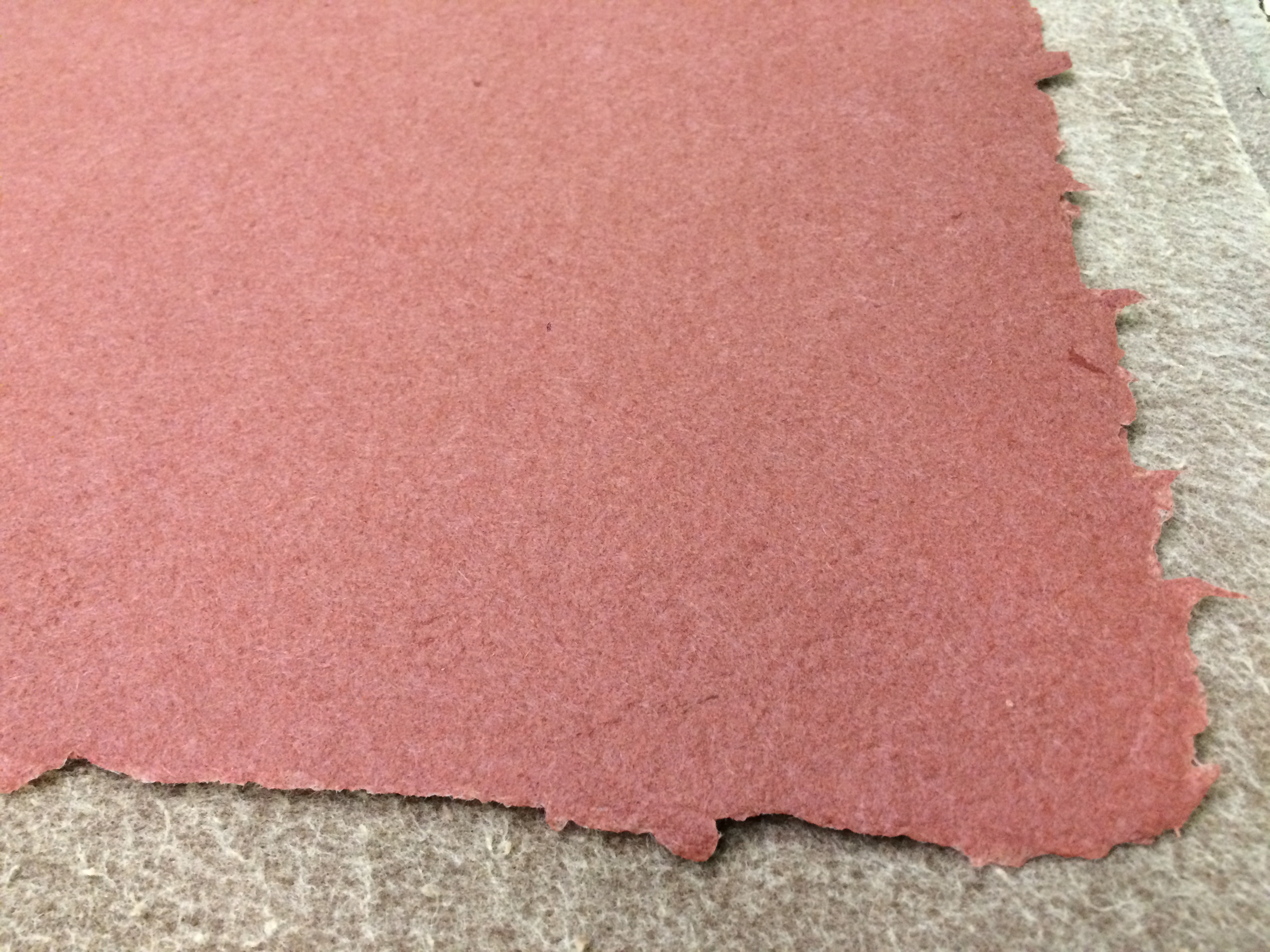
A handmade sheet of flax paper with a deckle edge

In papermaking, a deckle edge is a feathered edge on a piece of paper, in contrast to a cut edge. Before the 19th century, the deckle edge was unavoidable, a natural artifact of the production process in which sheets of paper were made individually on a deckle, a wooden frame. Today, machine-made paper may artificially have its edges produced with deckle edges.

The deckle could not make a perfect seal against the screen at the edges and the paper slurry would seep under, creating a rough edge to the paper. The deckle edge could be trimmed off, but this extra step added to the cost of the book. Beginning in the early 1800s with the invention of the Fourdrinier machine, paper was produced in long rolls and the deckle became mostly obsolete. Although there was some rough edging on the ends of the rolls, it was cut off, and the individual sheets cut out from the roll would have no deckle edge in any case.

== History ==
The term derives from the German word Deckel ("cover" or "lid"), referring to the removable frame on a papermaking mould that produced the characteristic rough edge.With the appearance of smooth edges in the 19th century, the deckle edge slowly emerged as a status symbol. Many 19th-century presses advertised two versions of the same book: one with edges trimmed smooth, the other a higher-priced deckle version. This suggested the deckle book was made with higher-quality paper, or with more expensive methods. This tradition carried forward into the 20th and 21st centuries. Modern deckle edges are produced by a purpose-built machine to give the appearance of a true deckle edge by cutting a smooth edge into patterns. Ironically, the apparent value of a deckle edge is, in part, the impression that it is handmade, an inherently greater expense than mass-production.

However, there remain many papermills worldwide, such as Arches paper and Hahnemühle, that still make hand-made paper with natural deckle edges; these are often used by artists for their unique properties, texture, colors, or other appeal or fit to their artistic vision. Many fine art works or digital prints therefore have natural deckle edges.

=== Criticism ===
Many readers consider the deckle edge to be inferior, given the awkwardness of turning the pages of deckle-edge books, while others are entirely unfamiliar with it and assume it to be an accidental defect. For example, Amazon has left notes to book buyers clarifying that the deckle is not an unintentional flaw in the product. A deckle edge is unrelated to the practice of unopened pages, in which a reader must cut open pages with a knife.
