= Tin Can (phone) =

Landline-like analog phone

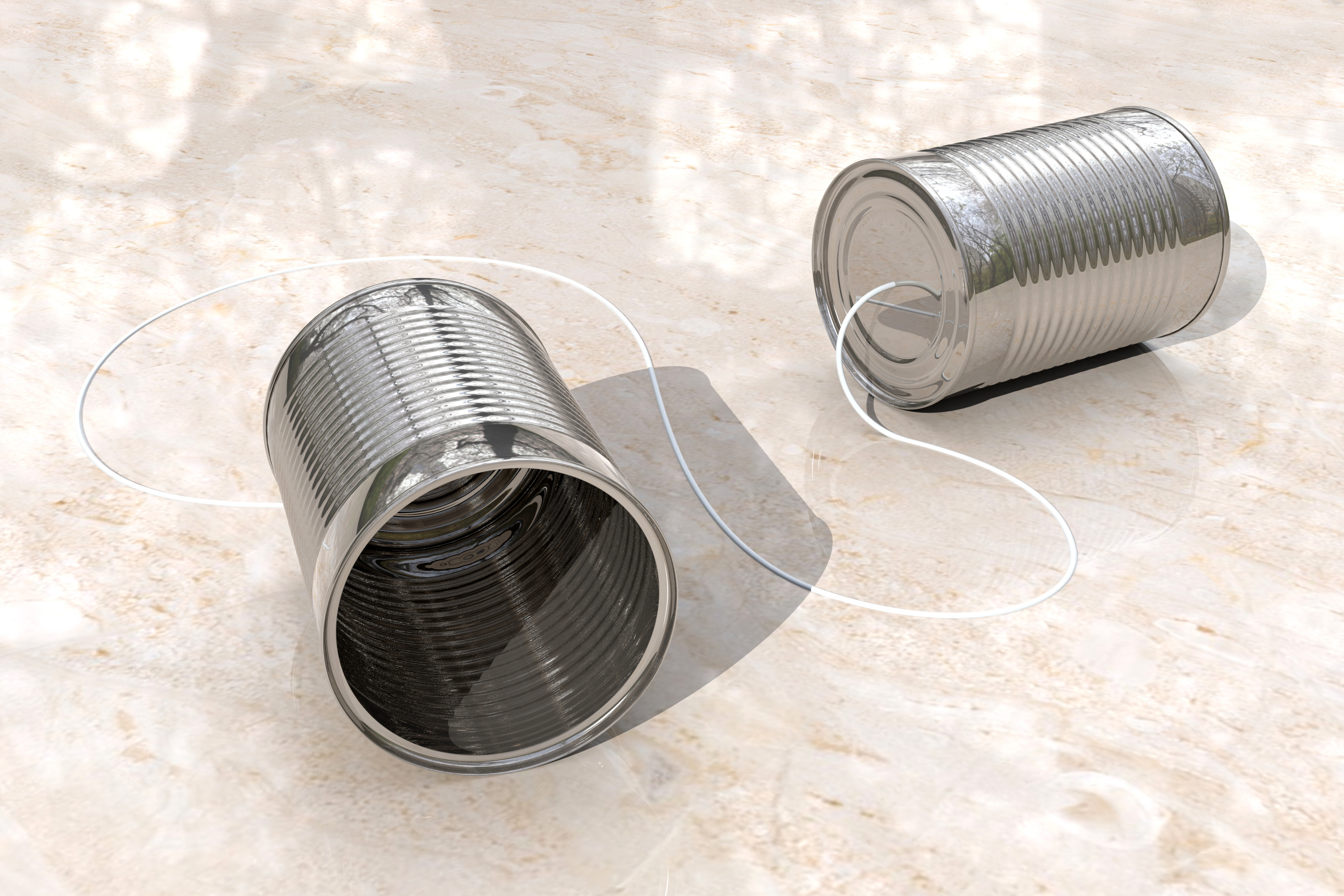
Tin Can's design resembles actual tin cans

Tin Can is an analog phone intended for children, available in the United States and Canada. It lacks a screen or advanced technology, and does not allow texting, video gaming, or app installation. It uses Wi-Fi to connect to the internet to make and receive calls. It was launched in April 2025 for USD$100 per unit.

The device went viral on the internet in late 2025. Bloomberg News reported "hundreds of thousands" of Tin Cans had been sold by the end of 2025. Around the same time, the startup behind the device raised funding.

== See also ==
- Dumbphone
- Tin-can telephone
