= Deckle =

Wooden frame for papermaking

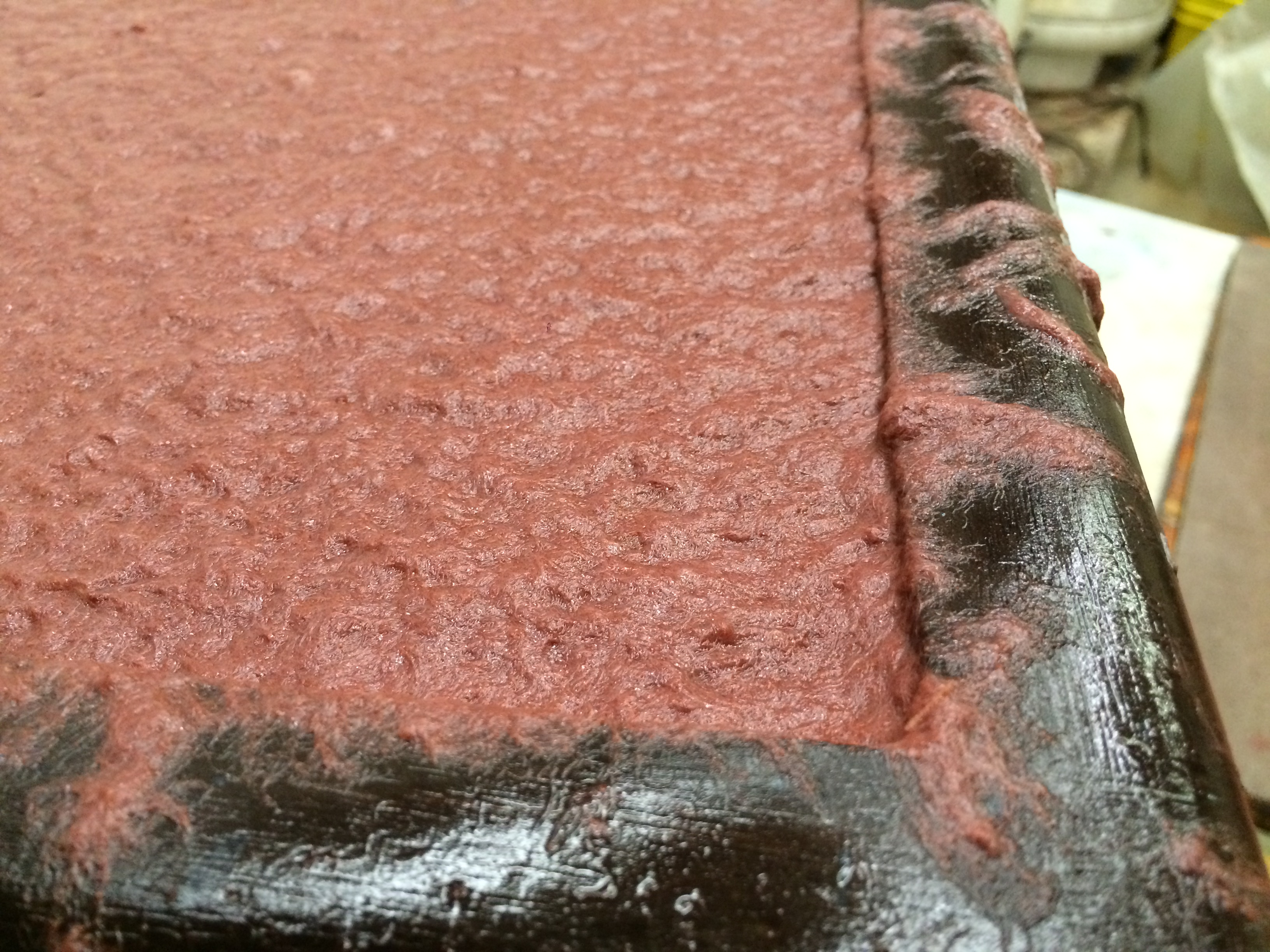
This image shows red pigmented flax fiber on a hand paper mould, still contained by a deckle. This sheet is quite thick which is why there is fiber spilling onto the deckle. Next it is couched onto felts and pressed.

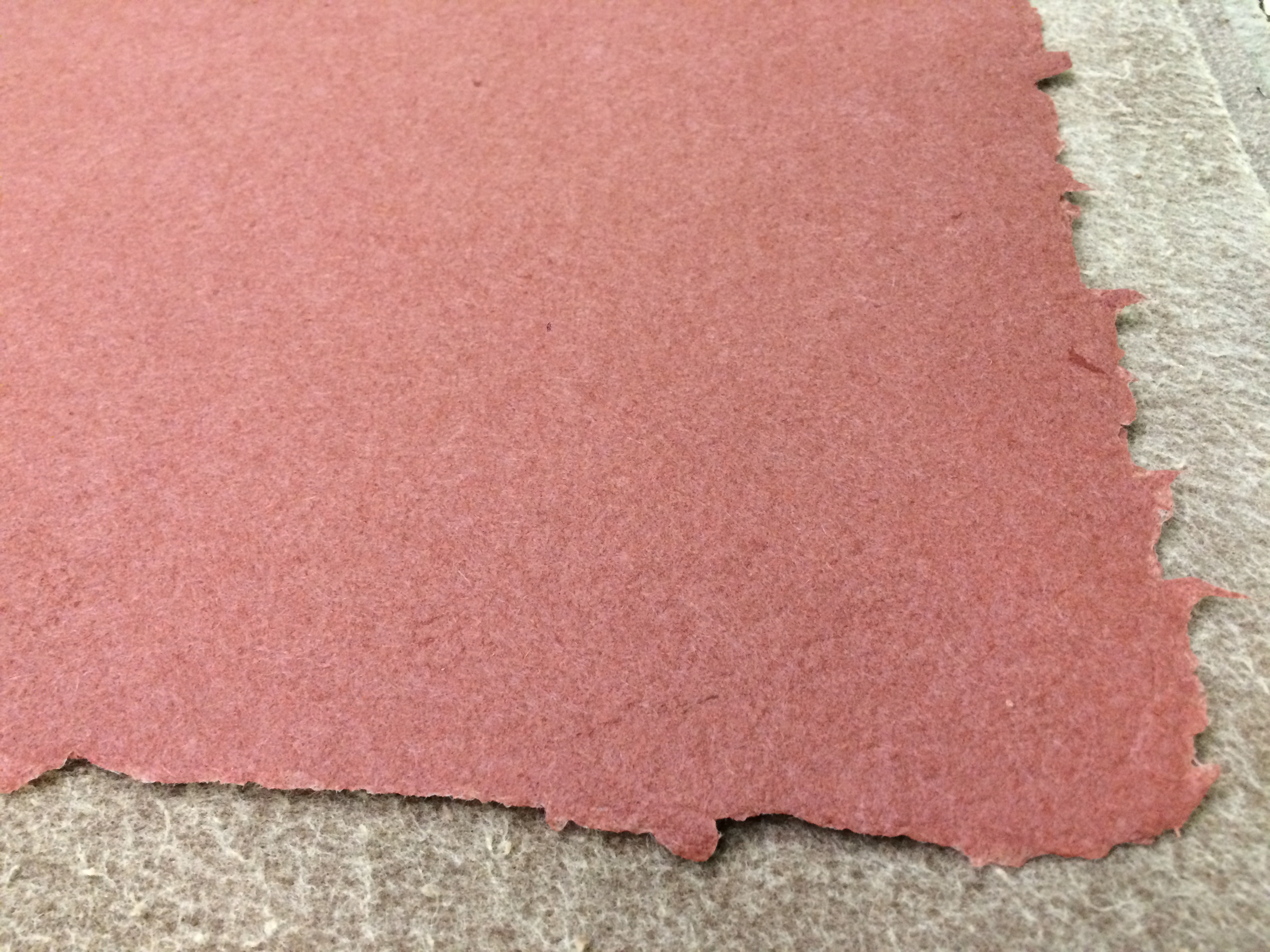
A hand-made piece of flax paper that has been pressed, but has not dried yet.

A deckle is a removable wooden frame or "fence" used in manual papermaking. The deckle is placed into a mould to keep the paper pulp slurry within the bounds of the wire facing on a mould, and to control the size of the sheet produced. The mould and deckle is dipped into a vat of water and paper pulp that has been beaten (fibrillated). The pulp is quickly scooped out of the vat and the mould and deckle is shaken as excess water is drained off. The deckle is then removed and the newly formed sheet is "couched" (set) onto felts. Fiber that has been beaten longer generally requires more time to drain. If the paper slurry gets under, or if long fibers settles on top of the deckle, it will cause a more irregular edge.

Beginning in the early 1800s with the invention of the Fourdrinier machine, paper was produced in long rolls and the deckle became mostly obsolete.

== Deckle edge ==
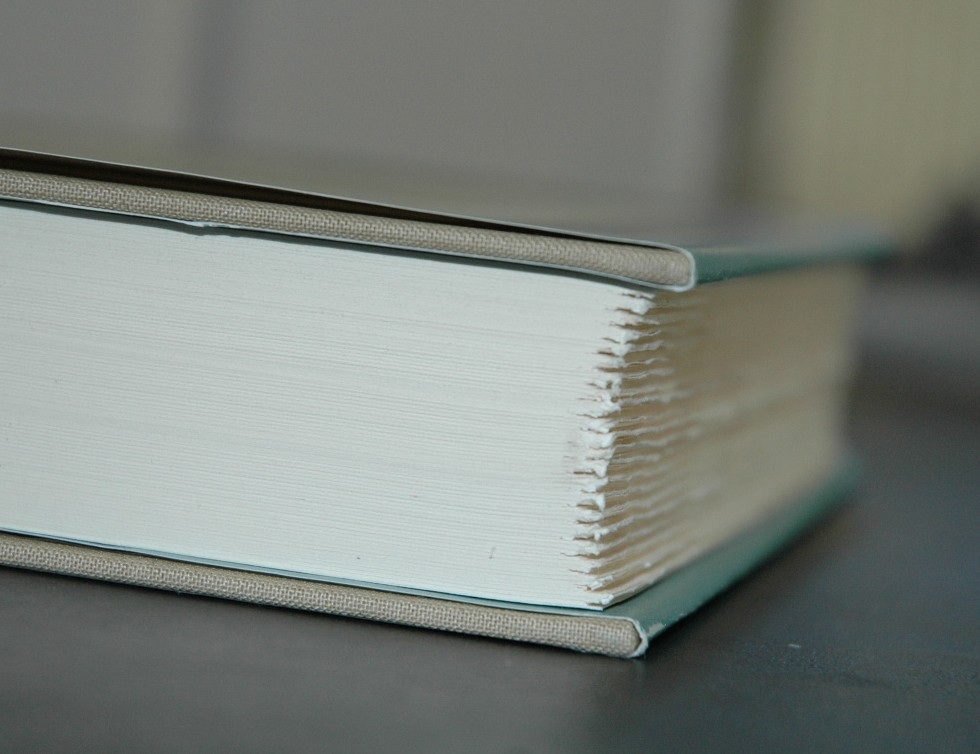
Deckle edge

Paper with a feathered edge is described as having a deckle edge, in contrast to a cut edge. Machine-made paper may artificially have its edges produced to resemble a deckle edge.

== Other uses ==
In photographic film manufacturing, deckles are die inserts that set the coating width of a slot die coater or the extrusion width of an extrusion die. They work by constraining the flow as the material exits the die. Since some materials have a tendency to neck in or spread out after leaving the die, workers may need to adjust the deckle position to achieve target width.

Deckle can also refer to the fatty part of a cut of brisket.
