= Tin Can Man =

Tin Can Man may refer to:

- Tin Can Man (The Munsters), an episode of The Munsters
- Tin Can Man (film), a 2007 Irish horror film
