= Metal can =

Metal can may refer to:

- Steel and tin cans
- Aluminum can
- Beverage can
