= Norske Skog Saugbrugs =

Pulp and paper mill in Halden, Norway

- Company type: Aksjeselskap
- Industry: Pulp and paper
- Founded: 1859
- Headquarters: Halden, Norway
- Key people: Kjell Arve Kure (manager)
- Products: Magazine paper
- Operating income: 2066 million kr (2013)
- Net income: NOK −77 million (2013)
- Number of employees: 450 (2019)
- Parent: Norske Skog
- Website: www.norskeskog.com

Norske Skog Saugbrugs AS is a pulp mill and paper mill located in Halden, Norway, which produces supercalender (SC) magazine paper. Located in the river Tista in Tistedalen, the mill produces 550,000 tonnes per year in three paper machines. Pulp is produced both from virgin fibers at an on-site thermomechanical pulp (TMP) mill. Part of Norske Skog, it is the sole remaining magazine mill in Norway.

Established as Saugbrugsforeningen in 1859, the company consolidated the sawmill operations along Tista, demolishing them and building a new sawmill. Pulp production was established in 1889. A major revamp from 1907 to 1910 saw the construction of Tistedalsfossen Power Station and pulp production based on the sulfite process. The company was involved in a wide range of wood processing industries, buying several smaller mills in the area.

The first two paper machines (PM1 and PM2) opened in 1914 and 1915. Viscose production was introduced along with PM3 in 1929. The mill underwent a gradual modernization through the 1950s, resulting in the opening of PM4 in 1963 and PM5 in 1968. From the mid 1970s through the early 1990s the mill cut most of its pollutants which had severely polluted Iddefjord and Tista. This coincided with a cut in most manufacturing not related to magazine paper. Norske Skog bought the mill in 1989 and opened PM6 in 1993. The mill's forests and three hydroelectric power stations were sold in 2001 and 2002.

== History ==
=== Establishment and early years ===
Sawmill operation to exploit the 66-meter (217 ft) fall in Tistedalsfossen has been conducted since the 16th century. In addition to the hydropower, the site was located at the mouth of Haldenvassdraget. Soon there were more than thirty sawmills and the site was incorporated as a town in 1665 and named Fredrikshald, later changed to Halden.

The system of privileges for sawmills was abandoned from 1 January 1860, at which time any citizen was free to establish and operate these. This caused eleven sawmill owners, with more than a combined thirty sawmills, to establish a joint operating company, Saugbrugsforeningen, in 1859. The company was capitalized through the issuing of shares worth 750,000 Norwegian speciedaler, and consisted of all the sawmills along Tistedalselva.

The company was in effect controlled and run by three families—Anker, Stang and Wiel—which were also heavily invested in the town's shipping. All directors in the company until 1909 were members of said families.

The goal of the new company was to rationalize the operation. All the former mills were demolished and a new facility was constructed. A major concern was the construction of the Kongsvinger Line, which would make it easier for forest owners in Aurskog, Nes and Vinger and to instead sell their lumber to Kristiania (Oslo). By cutting operating costs at the mills, the investors hoped to compensate for the reduced transport costs by railway. The new mill was situated on the south side of the river, on the lot Kjøbmandsdalen. At the time the new mill opened it had about 100 employees.

Mechanical saws were introduced in the early 1867, when the first steam-powered saw was installed. A carpenter shop opened in 1875, predominantly producing doors and windows. Through the 1870s the company ran with high margins and invested a substantial part of this in forest estates. The mill was expanded several times, and by 1883 it had eight production lines and 445 employees. This was in part due to major exports to Australia starting in the 1880s. The carpenter shop was destroyed in a fire in 1897 and never rebuilt.

=== Pulp, electricity and paper ===
The first pulp mill along Tistaelva was Søndre Skåningsfossen Træsliberi, established by Christian Anker in 1867. This operated profitably and was able to capitalize on much of the otherwise low-value refuse from the sawmills. Saugsbrugforeningen started considering the possibility of building its own pulp mill in 1872. Declining pulp prices from 1874 caused the company to shelve the plans for the meantime. The mechanical pulp mill opened in 1889 with five grinders and annual production of 11,000 tonnes, employing sixty people. The pulp mill was the company's until then largest investment, financed through a loan of 1.25 million Norwegian krone.

By the 1900s the company had challenges making ends meet. The company therefore in 1905 initiated a program to totally revamp its operations. The three head saw mills were demolished and replaced with a new, steam-powered head saw mill adjacent to the edger mill. The pulp mill was expanded to handle 15,000 tones annually, powered by the new Tistedalsfossen Power Station. Finally a new chemical pulp mill was to be built at Kaken. A complicating factor for the power station was that the company only owned about two-thirds of the waterfall rights. Finally the Tista Canal was built, allowing direct access from Kaken to the port.

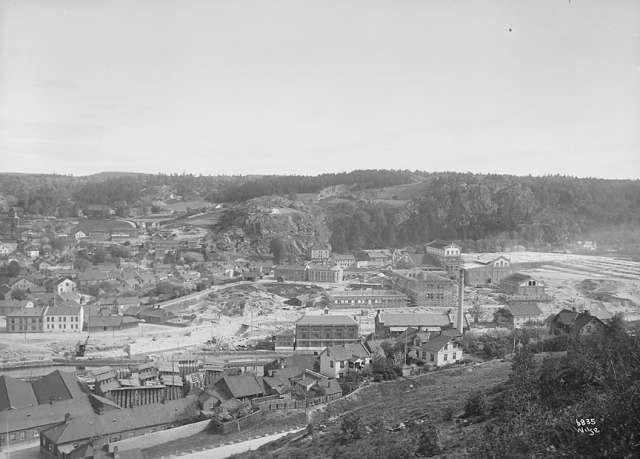
Kaken in 1907

The power station was completed in 1907, and the following year the sulfite process chemical pulp mill was completed the following year. All the upgrades were finalized in 1910, having cost NOK 4.1 million—twice the budget. A particular contributor was the pulp mill, which had cost NOK 3 million. Conservatism within management and owners led the company to not even discuss if a loan would be an appropriate way of funding the investments. Instead, 250 square kilometers (97 sq mi) of productive forest in Sweden was sold to Borregaard for NOK 4.7 million.

The pulp mill came off on a poor start, with declining pulp prices. Most of the pulp was exported and director Henry Melhuus therefore proposed that Saugbrugsforeningen establish a paper mill. He hoped to reduce the volatility in revenue and that the company would do better in poor times. This resulted in a plan for a paper mill with two paper machines with a combined capacity of 10,000 tonnes, a new electrical pulp mill with an annual capacity of 12,000 tonnes, an expansion of the chemical pulp mill and an expansion of the power station. Total investments were NOK 4 million.

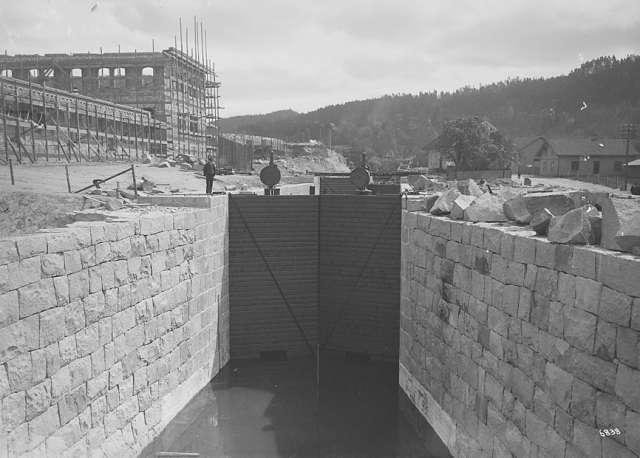
From the construction on the Tista Canal in 1907

The plans were approved in January 1912. Most of the work was completed in 1915, when the first paper machine, PM1, was concluded. PM2 opened the following year. It was the first-largest paper mill in Norway, with most of the output being exported to the United Kingdom. The company bought Ørje Bruk in 1913, which operated a 9,000-tonne pulp mill. It was bought predominantly to secure its hydroelectric rights.

=== Interwar period ===
The price of pulp doubled during the First World War, but so did many of the costs, including a 250 percent increase in wages. By 1917 export of sawed wood was responsible for forty percent of its revenue. The company experienced high profits during the war, peaking at NOK 5.6 million in 1918. However, the investments and increasing prices caused two issues of new shares, both of NOK 6 million in 1916 and 1918, raising the share equity to NOK 18 million. Demand and prices skyrocketed from 1919, but Saugbrugsforeningen, like many of its competitors, failed to capitalized due to the corresponding rise in lumber prices.

Sales prices dropped again from 1921, and the company had a deficit of NOK 6 million that year. The rest of the 1920s remained difficult period for the company, with low margins and highly fluctuating but steadily falling export. Ankers Træsliperi & Paperifabrik was bought in 1924 and expanded the following year to an annual production of 16,000 tonnes of pulp and 10,000 tonnes of newsprint.

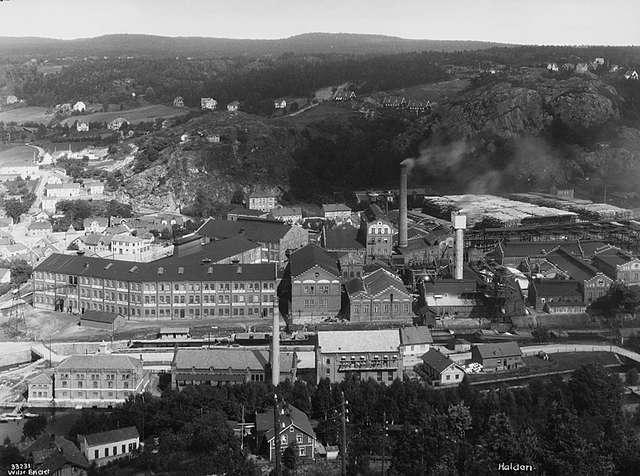
Kaken in 1928

Saugbrugsforeningen ran trial production of viscose in 1922. This led to the approving of a 7,000 tonne mill in 1928. It was built at the same time as the 3,000-tonne PM3. Both began production in 1929, after an investment of NOK 2 million. 1931 was dominated by a major strike from 8 April to 11 September and the annual production was halved.

The head saw mill was closed in 1931, but the edger mill was kept and refined coarse-cut wood from other mills in the area. Viscose became gradually more important; it was responsible for 30 percent of production in 1930 and 57 percent in 1937. Newsprint production was cut out and the remaining production move to finer grades of paper. The company also established production facilities for wood engraving and pressure treating. The 1930s were generally good times for the company, with a steady increase in prices. Then the bottom fell out the market in 1938, resulting in NOK 2 million in losses.

During the Second World War, from 1940 to 1945, the authorities required the mill to shift its pulp production to feed. The entire country lacked fossil fuels, causing electric boilers to be installed to produce steam for the paper machines. Forestry was reduced as fuels ran short, causing the mill to run out of fibers. The mills were run down by 1945, and production did not reach pre-war levels until 1950.

=== PM4 and PM5 ===
A major upgrade to the plant took place in the period after 1950, following General Director O. T. Jarlsby's ten-year plan. Production was eased throughout the period by increased access to lumber and higher demand. The Anker Mill was rebuilt to produce paperboard. A new lumber cleaning mill opened in 1951, followed by a new central furnace the following year, a pyrite roaster and lumber chopper in 1953 and a new beater in 1954. Tistedalsfoss II Power Station and a spirit factory with an annual production of 5,000,000 liters (1,100,000 imp gal; 1,300,000 U.S. gal) opened in 1955. A hydrocyclone facility for the sulfite pulp mill, new 10,000 tonne oil tanks and a calcium carbonate management facility for the paper mill were taken into use two years later. A new warehouse was completed in 1958 and the bleaching site expanded the year after. The ten-year plan ended with the expansion of the conditioning facility for the paper mill and expansion of the sulfite pulp mill in 1960. In addition a series of minor upgrades and modernizations were carried out throughout the 1950s, such as extending the paper machines. From 1956 operations ran around-the-clock.

Meanwhile, there was an modernization of the upstream logistics. A breakthrough occurred when it was established that lumber did not have to be air-dried for two years before being made to pulp, freeing up a storage site at Veden which had stored up to one million logs. Trucks were introduced in transport and hundreds of kilometers (hundreds of miles) of lumber roads were built to ease extraction. For instance they were used to truck lumber from Store Le to Øymarkasjøen, thus closing the Otteeid Canal. Increased lumber demand was covered through procurement from Värmland and the Glomma watershed. Log driving was eliminated on tributaries and limited to the main course of Haldenvassdraget.

The company decided in 1960 to increase its paper production dramatically. PM4 started operations in 1963 in a fully integrated production line manufacturing supercalender magazine paper, with an annual production of 50,000 tonnes. This involved the installation of a new lumber cleaning and chopping mill, a new pulp mill, a new boiler system and a new water pipe from Femsjøen. Steam from the Halden Reactor was used in the paper machines. Saugbrugsforeningen thus became the first paper mill in the world to derive steam from nuclear power. Investments from 1958 to 1963 cost NOK 165 million. By 1964 the company was producing 130,000 tonnes annually of various paper grades, up four-fold since 1950. The company had 3,000 employees, of which about 1,000 worked in the forests.

During the planning of PM4 there had been considered building a fifth paper machine, and a lot was reserved for the machine. After PM4 was operational, management decided to go for further expansion. PM5 was built by Wärtsilä and became operational in July 1968. It had an annual production of 70,000 tonnes and initially operated at 600 meters (2,000 ft) per second. Investments were about NOK 100 million. PM4 and PM5 were by far the largest paper machines in Norway until the 1966 opening of Norske Skog Skogn. PM1 was converted to produce fine grade paper based on pulp from birch and spruce. By 1970 the factory's output reached 220,000 tonnes annually.

PM2 and PM3 were taken out of service in 1977 and 1980, respectively.

=== Environmental issues ===
The first major environmental concern was air pollution, with Halden experiencing the highest sulfur oxide content of any Norwegian town. The sulfite pulp used limestone, which made it impossible to capture the sulfur oxide. This was mitigated in 1978, when the pulp mill was rebuilt to instead use magnesium.

Until the 1970s Saugbrugsforeningen emitted all its production wastes into the river Tista without any form of cleaning. Tista drains into Iddefjord, which is narrow and has a threshold at its mouth, severely limiting the flow of water into Skagerrak. A 1975 survey concluded that the fjord was biologically dead—its oxygen content so low that life could not be sustained.

With new regulations in place in 1975, Saugbrugsforeningen initiated a process to reduce its emissions. NOK 212 million were invested between 1975 and 1978, involving a collection system for sulfite waste, a new chemical treatment plant, two external sedimentation pools and two electric boilers. By 1980 the situation in Iddefjorden had improved, but by 1985 the improvements had stagnated and further measures were required.

After the first half of the 1970s gave high prices, the company experienced low prices during the latter part of the decade. Meanwhile, it was a severely unmodern mill, oftentimes employing archaic and inefficient production processes. Per Ethold was hired as chief executive officer in 1977 and started the process of modernizing the mill. By 1981 all auxiliary production mills were closed, including fine-grade paper, sulfite pulp and sawed wood. This led to major layoffs and demonstrations by the labor unions.

A second wave of environmental investments started in 1986. A treatment plant for the bark water was completed in 1986 and a central cleaning plant for debarking of the lumber the following year. In 1988 the sedimentary pool was rebuilt and a treatment plant for the smoke from the bark burning was completed. Bleaching with chlorine was replaced with hydrogen peroxide and sodium dithionite in 1989. This was largely done during a period when most customers demanded the removal of chlorine in products. This demand has since recessed. These investments cost a combined NOK 40 million.

A further NOK 36 million were invested in 1990 and 1991, reducing water consumption, fiber emissions, and smoke emissions. A precipitation process was introduced in the sedimentary process. NOK 202 million was invested in a four-stage biological treatment plant completed in 1992. This produces biogas and sludge, which were burned and used for heating. The most important factor was the closing of the sulfate mill in 1991, which cut most of the pollution to water. By 1995 emissions had been reduced sufficient to reestablish ordinary biological activities in the fjord. NOK 180 million was invested in a bio boiler in 1996.

=== Kosmos and Norske Skog ===
The 1970s and 1980s saw a modernization of the forestry. The number of lumberjacks in the mill's 360 square kilometers (140 sq mi) of forest had dropped to fifty and the work largely carried out using harvesters. The last log driving took place in 1982—better roads and cumbersome operations due to the number of locks made trucks more profitable. Increased production led to need for more lumber, but import from Sweden was reduced with the increased Swedish industry. Saugbrugsforeningen was therefore forced to import from further afield, including Denmark, Poland, Germany and for periods also from Canada, Russia and the Baltic.

The company approved a five-year investment plan in 1980, costing NOK 500 million. Both PM4 and PM5 were to be modernized and received computer-based controlling systems. Low prices caused the plans to be postponed after PM5 was completed in 1981. The conglomerate Kosmos bought Saugbrugsforeningen in 1983, paying about NOK 100 million for the company. Both prior and afterwards there was discussion of Saugbrugsforeningen joining a major paper production group. PM4 was upgraded in 1986 and 1987, costing NOK 296 million.

Kosmos considered selling Saugbrugsforeningen in 1985, and annually contacted various potential purchasers. The two major players were Orkla–Borregaard and Norske Skog. The former operated the Borregaard mill in the neighboring town of Sarpsborg. Norske Skog had bought a substantial portion of what became Norske Skog Follum from Orkla–Borregaard in 1985, under the gentleman's agreement that they would avoid entering the Østfold market. Borregaard owned major forest areas close to Saugbrugsforeningen's and the latter aimed to achieve synergies both in regard to logistics and operation of the forest estates.

Kosmos collapsed in 1988 and was taken over by I. M. Skaugen. They aimed at divesting the diversified portfolio in the company in the aim of restructuring Kosmos as a pure shipping company, and placed Saugbrugsforeningen and other assets up for sale. Noegotiations for a sale to Norske Skog commenced on 12 January 1989. The company was valuated at NOK 1.8 billion, although a purchaser also had to carry out the plans for a new paper machine, estimated to cost NOK 3 billion. An important strategic consideration for Norske Skog was that it did not have any production of magazine paper, something the inclusion of Saugbrugsforeningen's production line would allow for. The take-over was approved by the purchaser on 9 November 1989 and effectuated on 1 December. The decision included approval of a new paper machine. Saugbrugsforeningen changed its name to Norske Skog Saugbrugs. Norske Skog paid NOK 460 million in cash and took over NOK 980 million in debt. The remaining NOK 360 million was financed through issuing new shares. Kosmos thus received NOK 820 million from their NOK 100 million investment six years earlier.

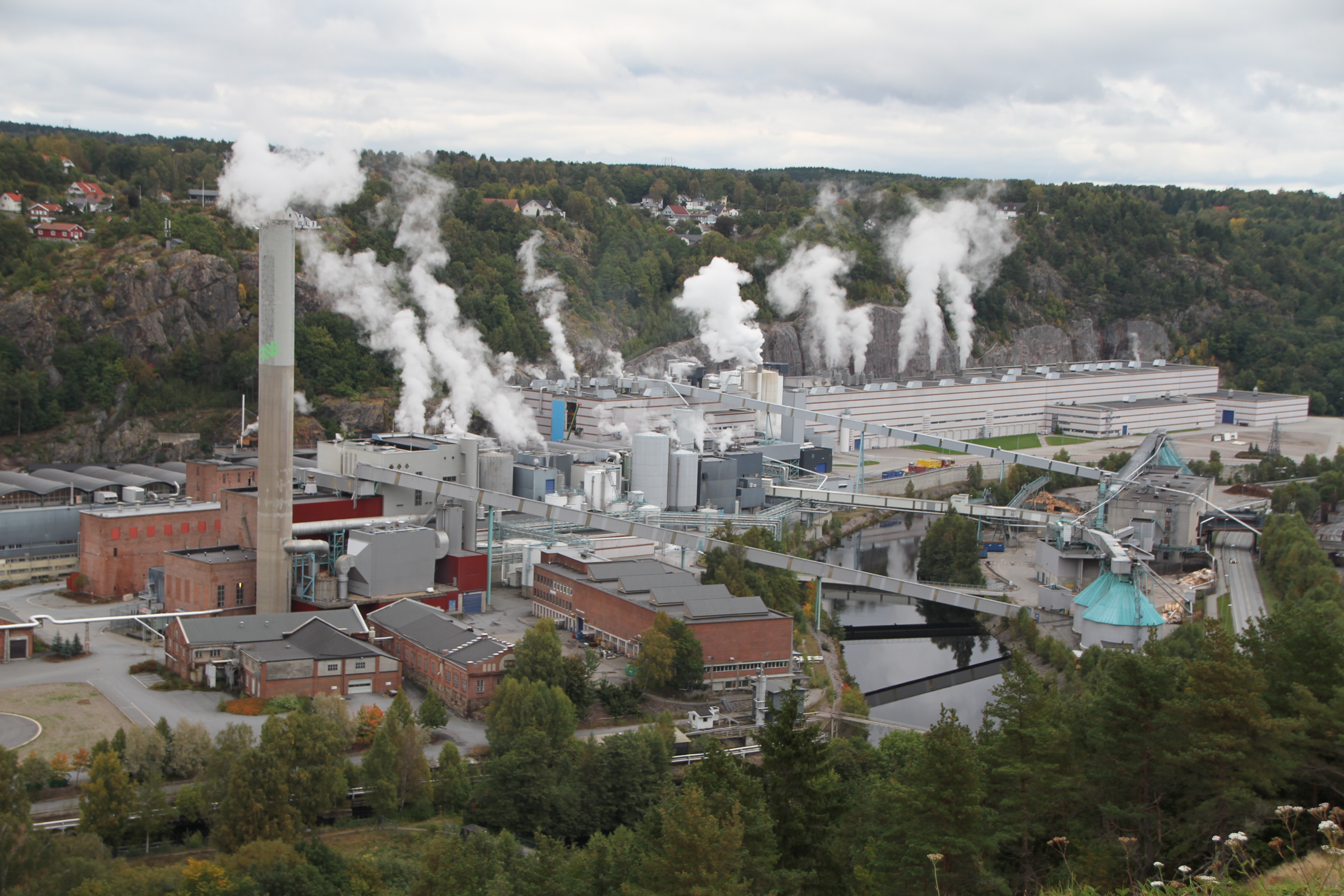
The contemporary facility

Norske Skog's board decided in December 1990 to close the sulfite pulp mill and build a new magazine paper machine, PM6. The decision to terminate cellulose production was both caused by the environmental impact as well as by a steady diminishing demand for chemical pulp. The recession following the dissolution of the Soviet Union meant that exports to Eastern Europe were decimated. Meanwhile, new production technologies for paper had less demand for cellulose. The closing resulted in a loss of 210 jobs, of which 25 were transferred to PM6 and 50 were retired early. Construction of the new mill took place at Skakkestad, to the northeast of the main facility. Originally PM6 was proposed to produce light weight coated paper, but after Stora bought the technological partner Feldmühle, PM6 had to revert to supercalender.

The rinser, chipping module and the thermomechanical pulp mill opened in January 1992. Installation of the paper machine started in July; at the most 1,150 people worked on the project as a whole. Built by Valmet, PM6 started operating on 7 February 1993. By 1995 PM6 set a world record of 1,626 meters (5,335 ft) per minute and the mill as a whole produced 523,000 tonnes and had a profit of NOK 700 million. Saugbrugsforeningen merged with Norske Skog from 1 January 1996, becoming a business unit named Norske Skog Saugbrugs.

Norske Skog sold the forest properties previously owned by Saugbrugs in November 2001 to the Norwegian Forest Owners Association for NOK 200 million. A year later the power stations formerly under Saugbrugs' control were sold to Akershus Energi.

== Bibliography ==
- Bjørndal, Ivar (1998). "Fra vannkraft til datakraft – trekk fra Haldens historie i hundre og tredve år" (in Norwegian). Halden: Forum Bjørndalen.
- Dybevik, Carsten; Langfjæran, Jarle (2012). "Norske Skog 50" (PDF). Norske Skog.
- Golombek, Rolf; Greve, Arent; Harris, Ken (2000). Miljøreguleringer av norsk treforedlingsindustri (PDF) (in Norwegian). Vol. 8/2000. Ragnar Frisch Centre for Economic Research. ISBN 82-7988-021-6. ISSN 1501-9721. Archived (PDF) from the original on 2 July 2015.
- Pollen, Geir (2007). Langt fra stammen (in Norwegian). Oslo: Gyldendal Norsk Forlag. ISBN 978-82-05-34625-3.
- Saugbrugsforeningen (1958). Saugbrugsforeningen 1859–1959 (in Norwegian). Halden.
