= Norske Skog Walsum =

Pulp and paper mill in western Germany

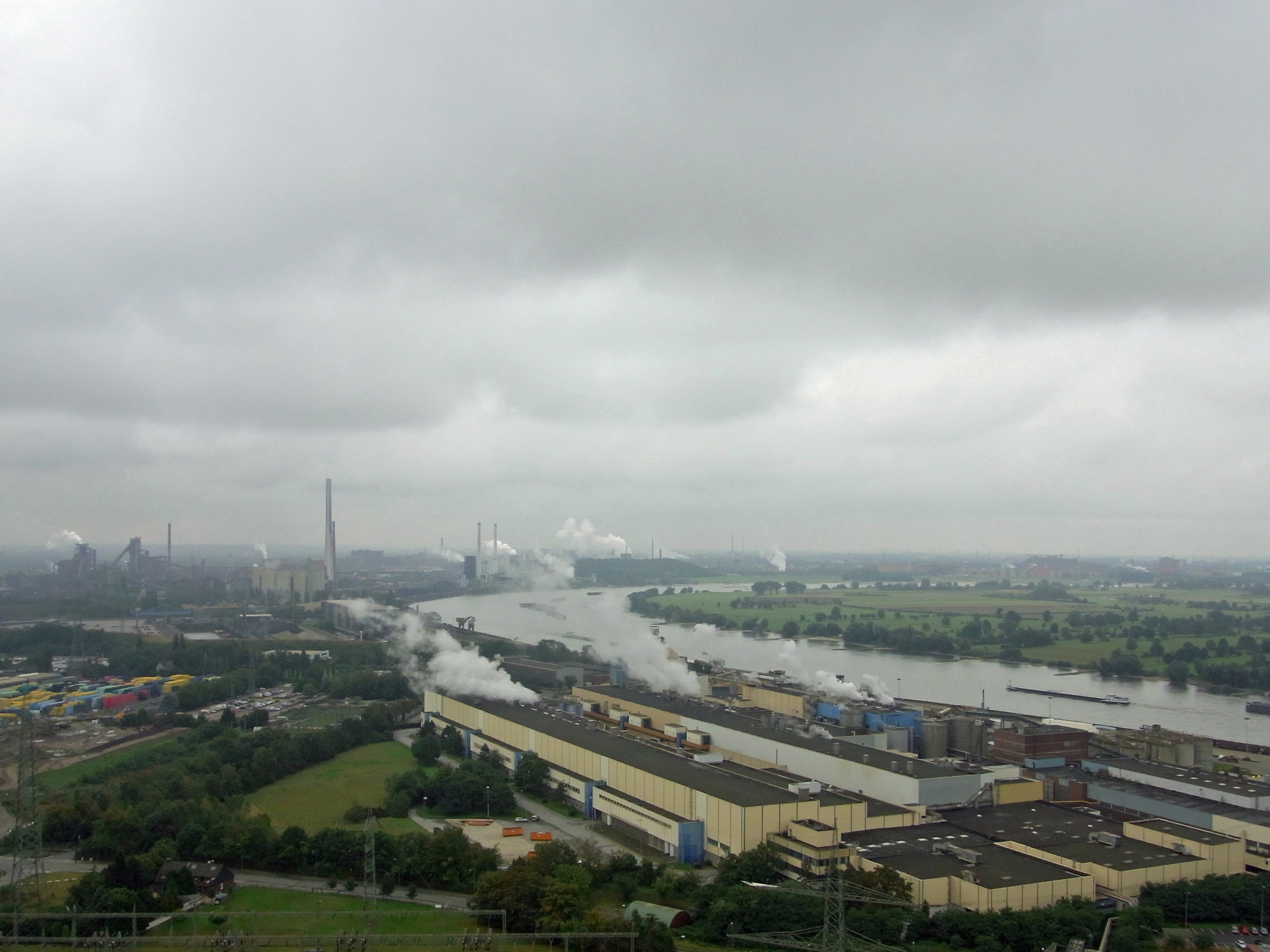

- Location within Germany
- Built: 1962
- Location: Walsum, Duisburg, North Rhine-Westphalia, Germany
- Coordinates: 51.5226°N 6.7150°E
- Industry: Pulp and paper
- Products: Magazine paper
- Employees: 460 (2013)
- Owner: Norske Skog
- Defunct: June 2015

Norske Skog Walsum is a pulp mill and paper mill situated in the Duisburg neighborhood of Walsum, the German state of North Rhine-Westphalia. The mill starts operations in 1962, established by Haindl and owned by Norske Skog from 2001. Since the 1990s the mill had two paper machines producing lightweight coated paper, a type of magazine paper. Both paper machines have a trimmed width of 725 centimeters (285 in). PM4 has an annual production of 225,000 tonnes, PM10 has 215,000 tonnes. The mill used as its source one-third thermomechanical pulp, one-third kraft pulp and one-third coating. The mill is situated on the Rhine. Until production curtailment in 2013, the mill employed 460 people.

== History ==
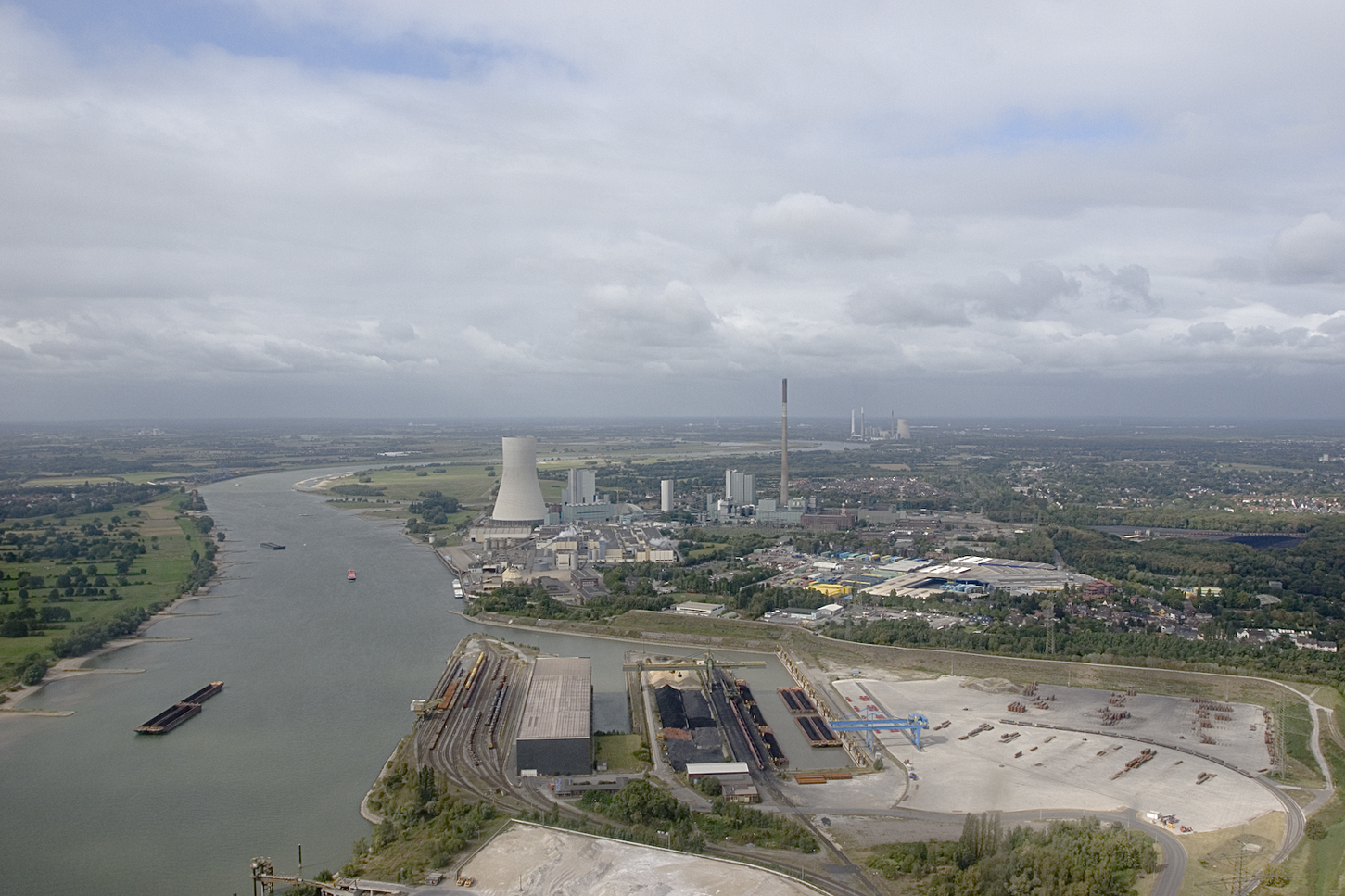
The mill situated across from the rail yard, on the east shore of the Rhine in front of Walsum Power Plant

The mill at Walsum opened in 1962 under the ownership of Haindl, initially consisting of one paper machine. PM4 was installed in 1985, followed by PM10 in 1991. Both were manufactured by Voith. Combined they gave an annual capacity of 420,000 tonnes of lightweight coated paper. The owners of the family-owned Haindl consortium decided to sell the company in 2000. It was bought in a joint deal, where UPM took over four and Norske Skog bought two of the mills—Parenco and Walsum. The deal took effect on 30 November 2001, with Norske Skog paying 8.2 billion Norwegian krone for the two mills. Norske Skog was in a process of specialization, selling all non-core assets while purchasing a dominant position in the world's newsprint and magazine paper market. Walsum allowed Norske Skog to add LWC to its portfolio.

The mill closed down PM4 in December 2013, curtailing production by 225,000 tonnes

The mill was managed by Norske Skog ASA filed for bankruptcy and produced under the following names continued: Walsum Papier.

== Bibliography ==
- Dybevik, Carsten; Langfjæran, Jarle (2012). "Norske Skog 50" (PDF). Norske Skog.
- Pollen, Geir (2007). Langt fra stammen (in Norwegian). Oslo: Gyldendal Norsk Forlag. ISBN 978-82-05-34625-3.
