= Jeonju Paper =

South Korean paper company

Jeonju Paper Corporation
- Type: Joint venture
- Industry: Pulp and paper
- Headquarters: Seoul, South Korea
- Products: Newsprint, magazine paper
- Owner: Morgan Stanley Private Equity Asia (58%); Shinhan Private Equity (42%)
- Website: jeonjupaper.com

Jeonju Paper Corporation, trading as Jeonju Paper, is a South Korean pulp and paper company. Headquartered in Jeonju, it operates Jeonju Mill and Cheongwon Mill, with a combined 1,030,000 tonnes annual production of paper, mostly newsprint. The company is owned by Morgan Stanley Private Equity Asia (58 percent) and Shinhan Private Equity (42 percent). The company was established as the South Korean operating subsidiary of PanAsia Paper on 1 February 1999, PanAsia Paper Korea. Ownership passed to Norske Skog in 2005, with the company becoming Norske Skog Korea. They sold the company to the current owners in 2008, after which the current name was adopted.

== History ==
Jeonju Mill was established in January 1965 as Seahan Paper. Production with PM1 started in 1968, when the company took the name Jeonju Paper. It was the first thermomechanical pulp mill in South Korea, sourcing its fiber from domestic red pine. The mill had an initial production capacity of 150,000 tonnes. Later expansions at the mill were based around deinkled pulp. The mill was bought by Hansol in October 1992, changing the group's name to Hansol Paper.

Cheongwon Mill was established by Shin Ho Paper, with construction starting in March 1994. Shin Ho was struck hard by the 1997 Asian financial crisis. They sold two of their mills in Thailand, Cheongwon and Singburi Mill, to the Norwegian pulp and paper company Norske Skog on 18 September 1998. Cheongwon Mill became Norske Skog Korea.

Meanwhile, Hansol entered negotiations with Norske Skog and the Canadian pulp and paper company Abitibi Consolidated to merge their Asian mills and sales efforts under a common ownership. On 30 July 1998 the three companies agreed to merge their newsprint holdings in Asia, founding PanAsia Paper Company with head offices in Singapore. PanAsia received full ownership of the two Korean mills, as well as partial ownership of Singburi Mill and Shanghai Mill in China. The new company was formed on 1 February 1999. Operations in Korea were established through the company PanAsia Paper Korea.

Hansol sold its third of PanAsia to Abitibi and Norske Skog in August 2001. Norske Skog bought Abitibi's shares in November 2005, and PanAsia became part of Norske Skog, with the Korean operating company taking the name Norske Skog Korea Co., Ltd. in January 2006. Around this time, the newsprint market started to decline, both because of higher input prices and a decline in global newspaper production. Norske Skog, which had sold all non-core assets to specialize in newsprint and magazine paper, was especially hard hit by the Great Recession. It subsequently carried out a gradual closing and sale of most of its mills.

The Korean operations were the first of Norske Skog's mills to be demerged, in June 2008. Purchasers were Morgan Stanley Private Equity Asia (58 percent) and Shinhan Private Equity (42 percent). Norske Skog Korea was sold for 830 million United States dollars, of which $620 was paid for in cash and the remained through the assumption of inherent debt. They change the company's name to Jeonju Paper corporation in September 2008.

== Production ==
The following is a list of the mills and paper machines (PM) operated by Jeonju Paper. It lists, for each paper machine, the type of paper produced, the annual production in tonnes, the trim width in millimeters and the speed in meters per minute.

Paper machines
Mill	PM	Product	Production	Trim width	Speed
Jeonju	PM3	GWS	97,000	4728	610
Jeonju	PM5	Newsprint/GWS	186,000	7880	1093
Jeonju	PM6	Newsprint	272,000	7880	1528
Jeonju	PM7	Newsprint	285,000	7880	1567
Cheongwon	PM1	Newsprint	183,000	6380	1300

== Bibliography ==
- Dybevik, Carsten; Langfjæran, Jarle (2012). "Norske Skog 50" (PDF). Norske Skog.
- Pollen, Geir (2007). Langt fra stammen (in Norwegian). Oslo: Gyldendal Norsk Forlag. ISBN 978-82-05-34625-3.
