= Cheongwon Mill =

Pulp and paper mill in South Korea

- Location within South Korea
- Built: 1994
- Location: Cheongwon-gu, Cheongju, North Chungcheong Province, South Korea
- Coordinates: 36.6555°N 127.3454°E
- Industry: Pulp and paper
- Products: Newsprint
- Owner: Jeonju Paper

Cheongwon Mill is a pulp mill and paper mill situated in Cheongju, South Korea. Owned by Jeonju Paper, the mill sources its fiber from deinking to feed a single paper machine producing newsprint. PM1 has an annual production of 183,000 tonnes, featuring a trimmed width of 6,380 millimeters (251 in) and a production rate of 1,300 meters (4,300 ft) per minute.

The mill was established by Shin Ho Paper, with construction starting in March 1994. Shin Ho was struck hard by the 1997 Asian financial crisis. They sold two of their mills, Cheongwon and Singburi Mill in Thailand, to the Norwegian pulp and paper company Norske Skog on 18 September 1998. Cheongwon Mill became Norske Skog Korea. These assets were merged into PanAsia Paper from 1 February 1999. Operations in Korea were established through the company PanAsia Paper Korea, which along with Cheongwon consisted of Jeonju Mill. Ownership passed to Norske Skog again in January 2006. The Korean operations were the first of Norske Skog's mills to be demerged, in June 2008. Cheongwon then became part of Jeonju Paper.

== Bibliography ==
- Dybevik, Carsten; Langfjæran, Jarle (2012). "Norske Skog 50" (PDF). Norske Skog.
- Pollen, Geir (2007). Langt fra stammen (in Norwegian). Oslo: Gyldendal Norsk Forlag. ISBN 978-82-05-34625-3.
