= Follum =

- Village
- Interactive map of Follum
- Coordinates: 60°11′28″N 10°14′13″E
- County: Buskerud
- Time zone: UTC+01:00 (CET)

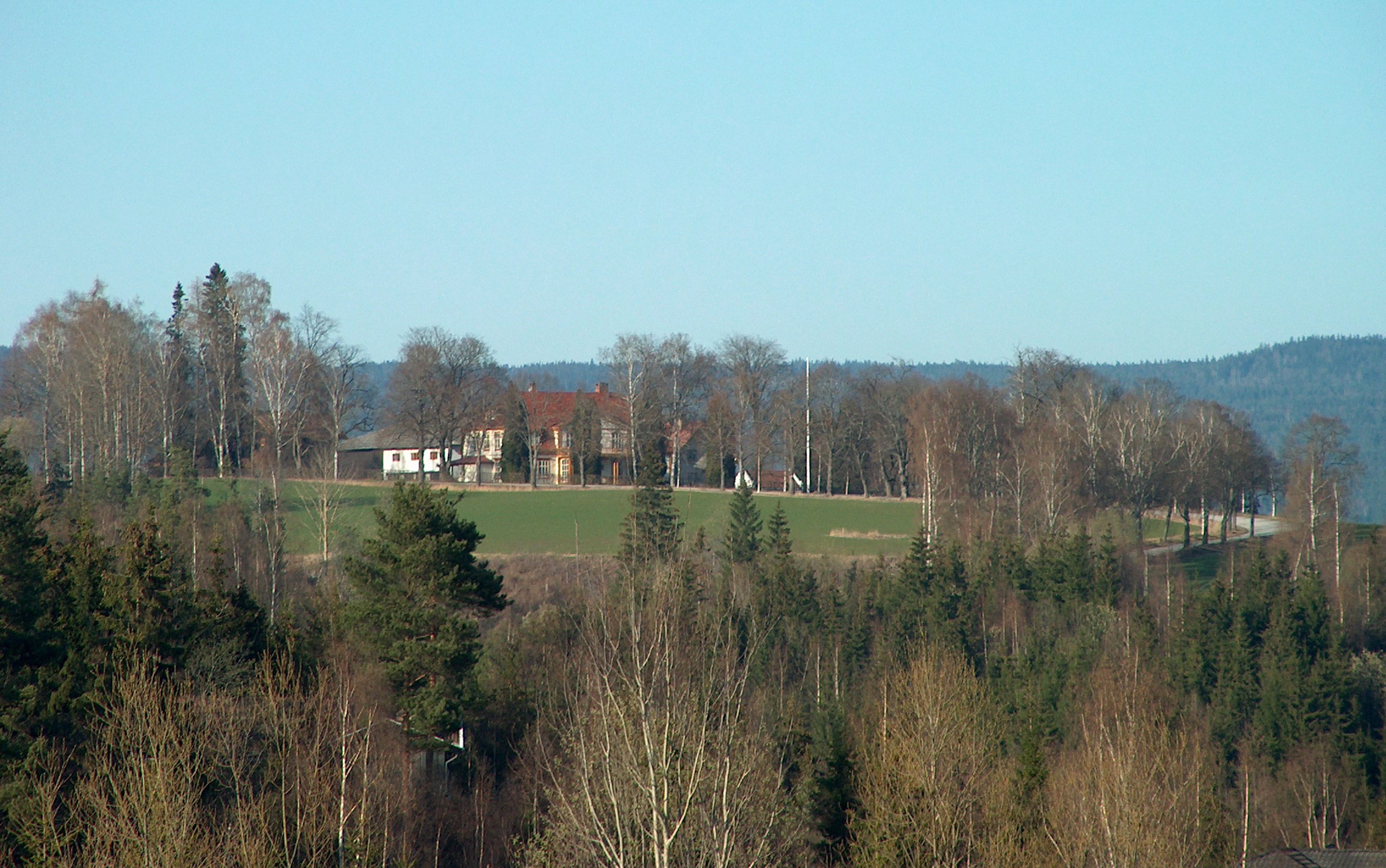
Follum gård

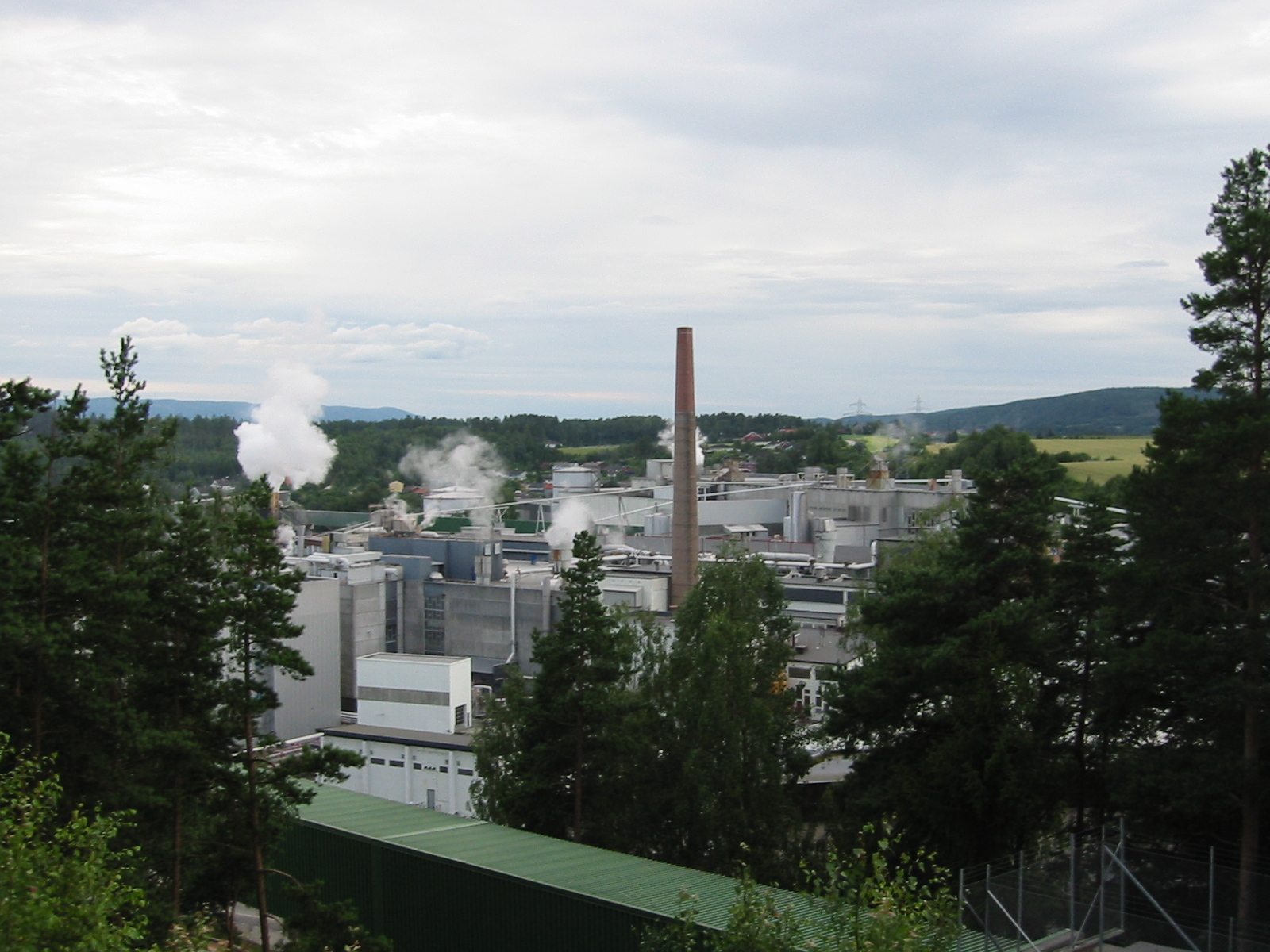
Norske skog Follum factory

Follum is a village in Ringerike municipality, Buskerud county, Norway.

== Location ==
Follum is located just north of Hønefoss on the west side of Ådal River (Ådalselva), along the old road to the Ådal valley. Follum was named for Follum gård, one of the oldest farms in the area.

Factories were built along the Ådal River, especially at the waterfalls. Follum Fabrikker (founded as Follum træsliberi in 1873), was started at Follum in 1873. It was once one of Norway's three largest paper mills. The main product was newsprint. It was purchased in 1989 by Norske Skog and now operates as Norske Skog Follum.

Between the factory and Veienmarka Road is Follumbyen, a residential area that was originally linked to the factory. On the side is another residential area, Begnamoen, with some connection to the factory. Follum school existed in the region from 1898 to 1965.

== Veien Cultural Heritage Park ==
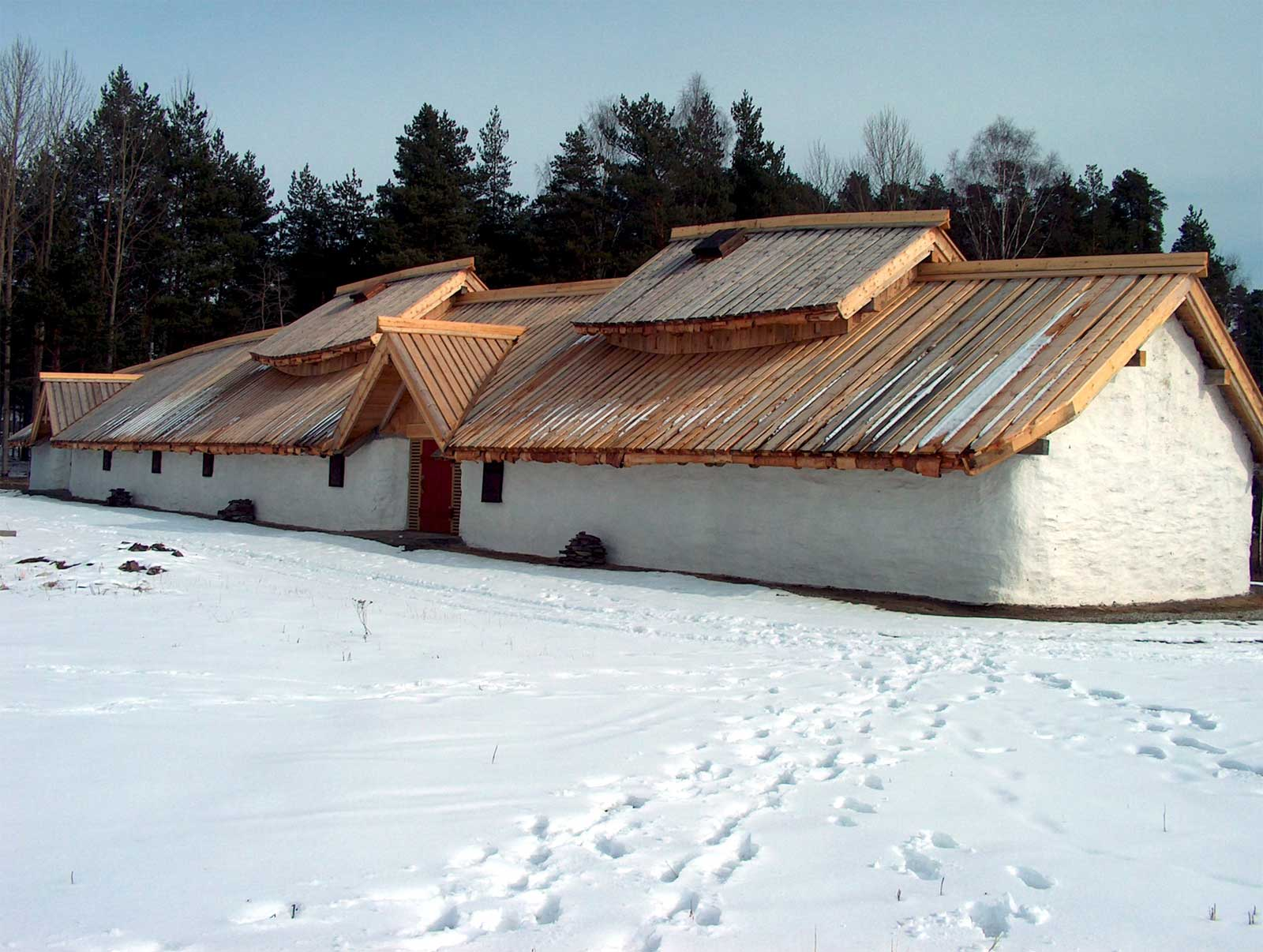
Reconstructed long-house at Veien Kulturminnepark

Off Veienmarka Road is an ancient burial ground with hundreds of graves and flat ground tombs. The large cemetery is now part of the Veien Cultural Heritage Park (Veien Kulturminnepark). Hringariki is the name of the foundation that operates the site as well as the Ringerikes Museum, the District Museum of Hole and Ringerike municipalities.

The cemetery has been known since the 1700s and investigated a number of times. In 1847 it was recorded to have more than 150 burial mounds in a field that stretched over more than 100 acres. The grounds, including 144 mounds, were excavated in 1870-71 by Professor Oluf Rygh. The largest of the burial mounds is Kongshaugen (meaning king hill from the Old Norse word haugr meaning hill or burial mound) which was richly endowed. It was excavated in 1824 when, among other things, a sword in gilded silver was found. Findings from the mound were dated to ca. 400 AD.

The site currently comprises approximately 94 acres, including 39 acres of wood and 45 acres of cultivated soil. In 1995, traces of a large long-house were unearthed dating from the Iron Age. The long-house has been reconstructed on the site and was completed in spring 2005. The discovery is unique in both the Norwegian and Scandinavian context both in terms of dating and size. Many other archaeological discoveries were also unearthed dating from earlier and later eras, the Stone Age and the Bronze Age. Many antiquities are now located in the collection of ancient artifacts of the Museum of Cultural History at the University of Oslo.

== Gallery ==
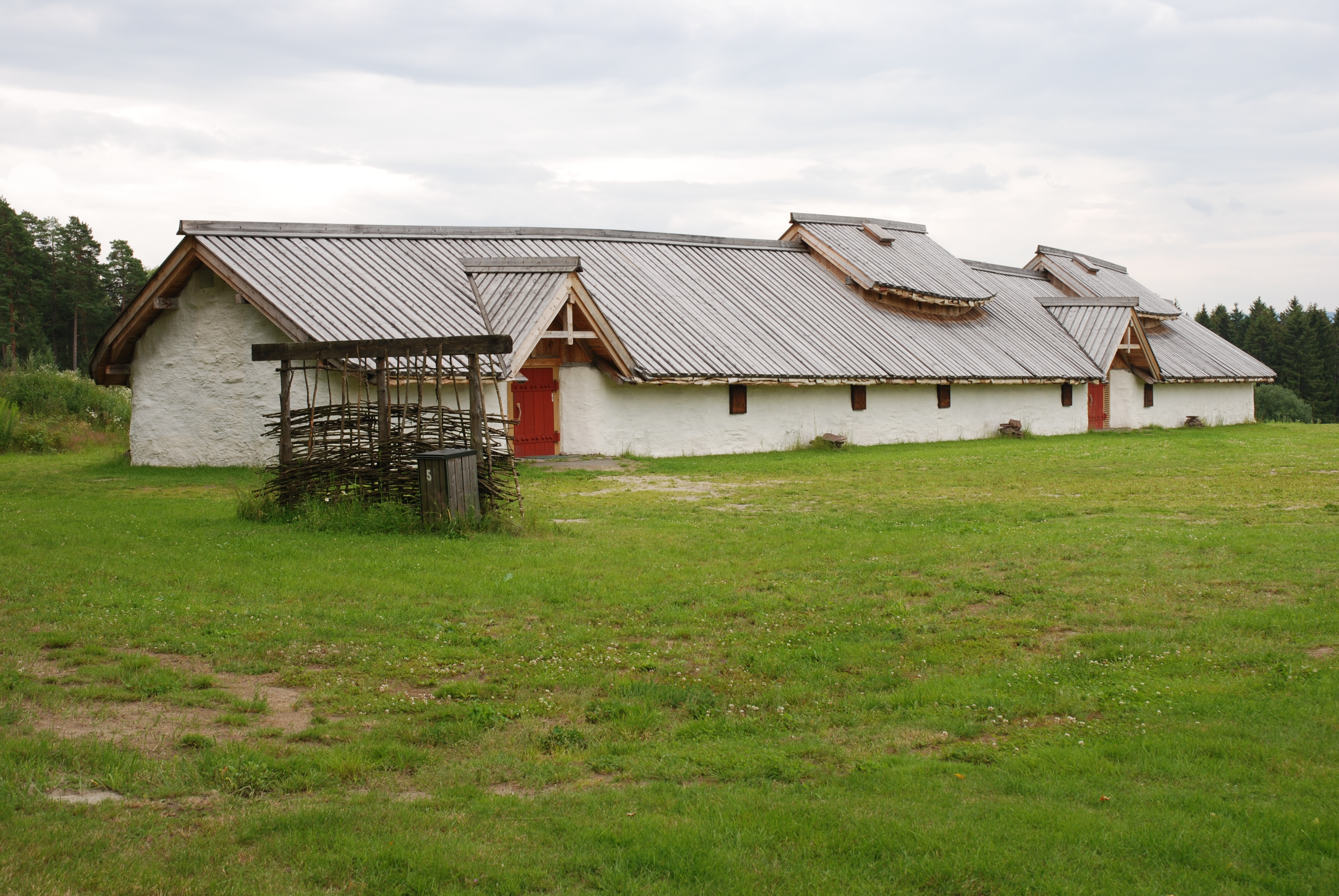
Reconstructed long-house
(Veien Kulturminnepark)

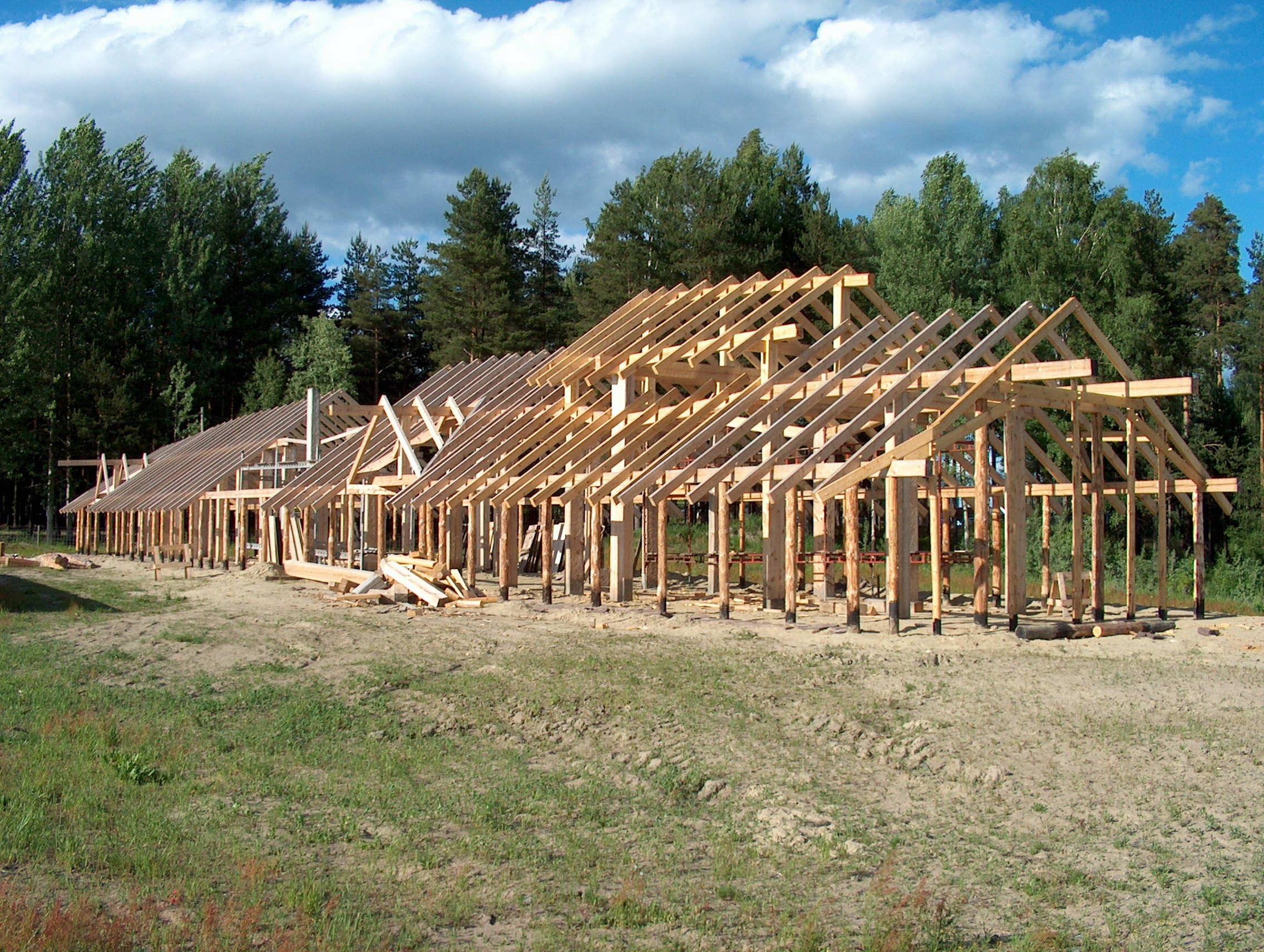
Long-house construction (Veien Kulturminnepark)

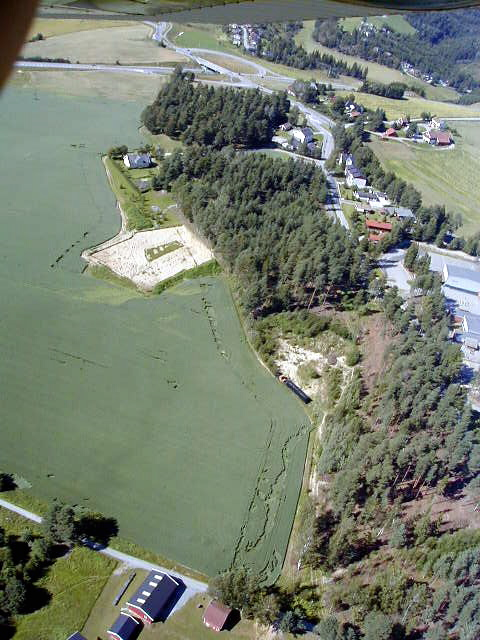
Grave site
(Veien Kulturminnepark)

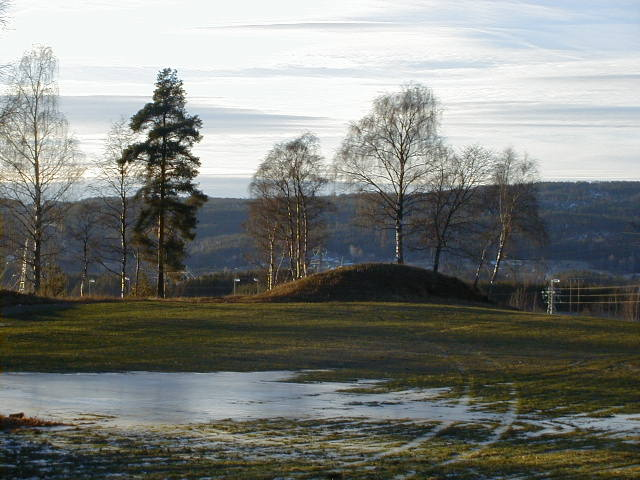
Ancient burial mound (Veien Kulturminnepark)

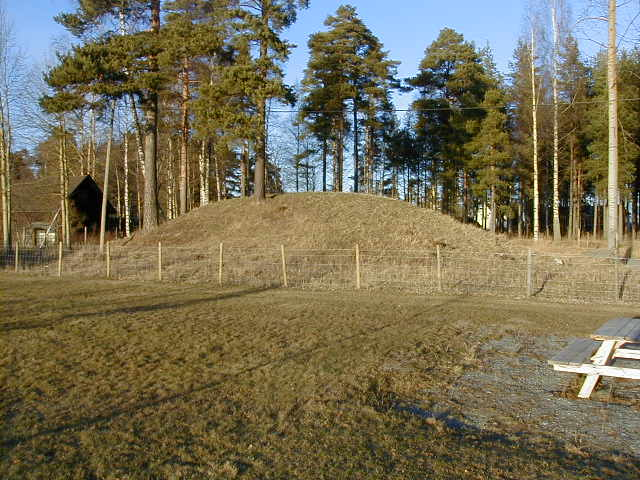
Ancient burial mound (Veien Kulturminnepark)
