= Parenco =

Dutch paper mill

Parenco B.V.
- Company type: Besloten vennootschap
- Industry: Pulp and paper
- Headquarters: Renkum, Netherlands
- Key people: Geert Wassens (general manager)
- Products: Magazine paper
- Number of employees: 260 (2012)
- Website: parenco.com

Parenco B.V. is a paper mill located in Renkum, Netherlands, on the shore of the Rhine. The mill was established on the site of an older mill in 1912 by Van Gelder & Zonen. The company operates two paper machines PM1 and PM2. PM1 has a capacity of 265,000 tonnes per year and is used for the production of so-called SC-B paper for magazines and advertising brochures. The other machine, PM2, was idled in 2009 by its then owner due to the declining demand of newsprint paper. This machine will be converted and from mid-2016 will produce about 385,000 tons of packaging paper, intended for the production of corrugated board.

== History ==
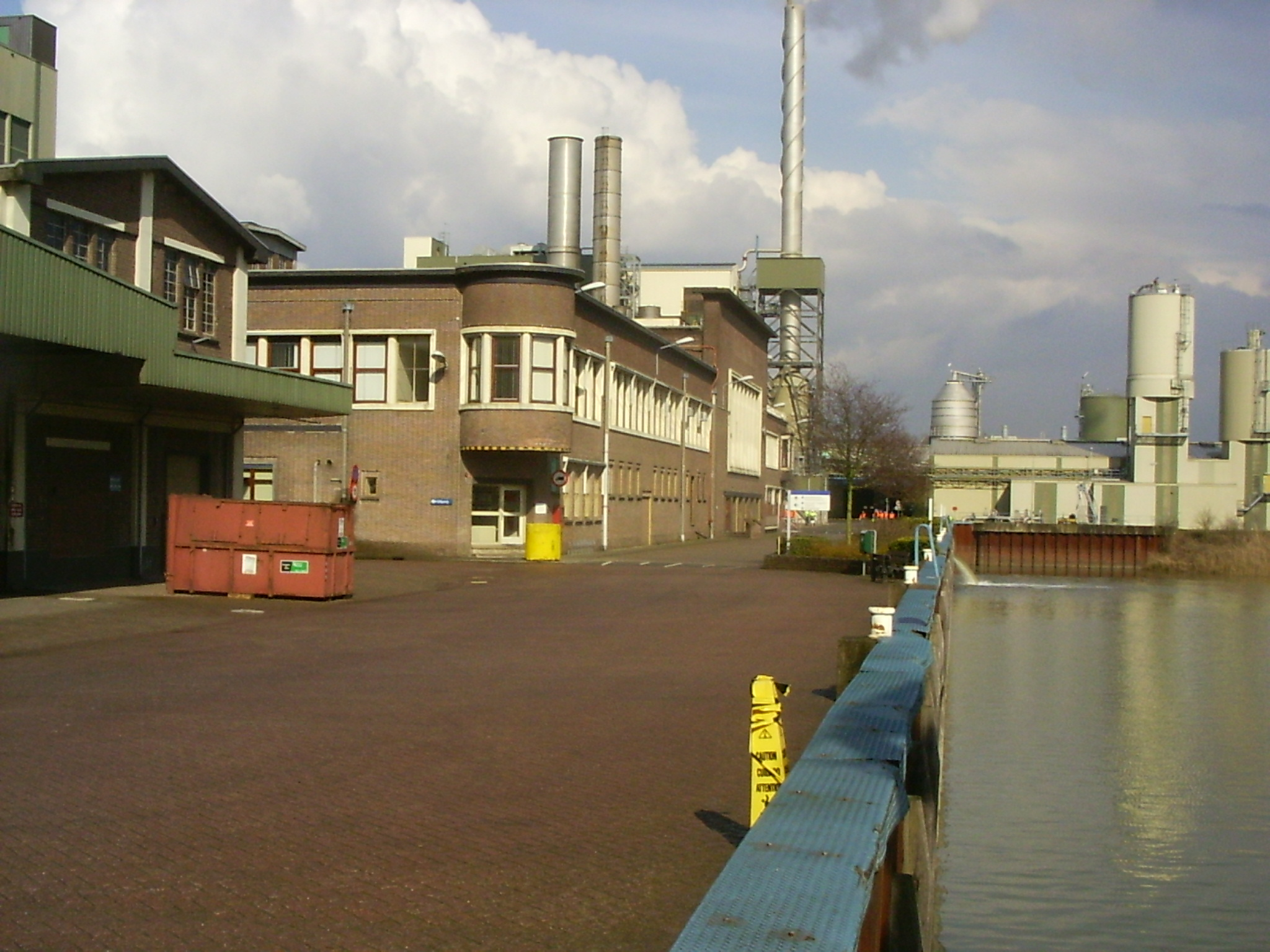
The port area

Papermaking has taken place in Renkum since 1598, with the establishment of The Bock. Harten was established as a paper mill in 1720. It was bought by Van Gelder & Zonen in 1907, who established a new mill, Renkum 2, in 1912. It featured two paper machines, mostly producing newsprint. They remained in use until 1979, when both were closed down and replaced with a new paper machine, PM2. Van Gelder filed for bankruptcy, but operations in Renkum continued with the independent company Parenco B.V.

German pulp and paper company Haindl bought Parenco in 1983, naming it Haindl Parenco. They invested to allow for a second paper machine, PM1, which started running in 1987. PM2 was upgraded in 1989, PM1 in 1998.

The owners of the family-owned Haindl consortium decided to sell the company in 2000. It was bought in a joint deal, where UPM took over four and Norske Skog bought two of the mills—Parenco and Walsum. The deal took effect on 30 November 2001, with Norske Skog paying 8.2 billion Norwegian krone for the two mills. Norske Skog was in a process of specialization, selling all non-core assets while purchasing a dominant position in the world's newsprint and magazine paper market.

The mill was renamed Norske Skog Parenco. As of 2005 it produced 419,000 tonnes of newsprint and magazine paper. Fiber was sourced 75 percent from deinked pulp and 25 percent for woodpulp processed as thermomechanical pulp (TMP), imported from Germany and Belgium. Due to the global decline in newsprint demand, Norske Skog shut down PM2 in June 2009. This resulted in the number of employees being reduced from 425 to 255. Meanwhile the TMP production and one of the deinking lines was terminated.

Norske Skog sold Parenco and the recycling company Reparco to H2 Equity Partners in August 2012 for €30 million. H2 stated that they hoped to find new market segments to produce other paper grades two and had a long-term goal of restarting PM2. On June 4, 2015, the announcement was made that Parenco invests approximately one hundred million euros with its owner H2 Equity Partners in the conversion of its PM2. After the conversion, PM2 will produce about 385,000 tons of packaging paper from mid-2016, intended for the production of corrugated board.

== Operation ==
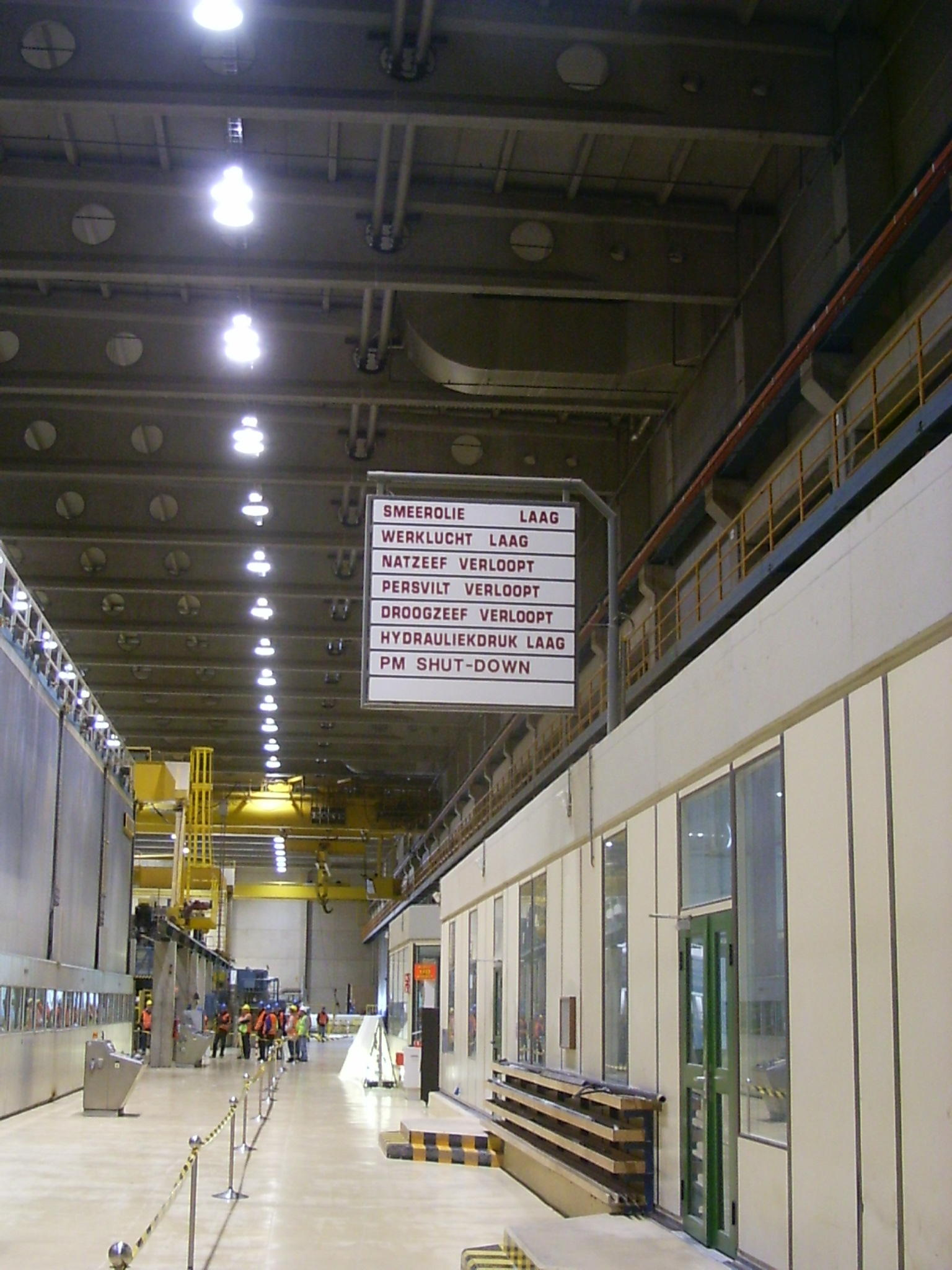
Inside the mill

One paper machine (PM1) has a production capacity of 260,000 tonnes of publication paper per year. For the production, the mill only uses recovered paper. The recovered paper mainly comes from waste paper collected at households. The Netherlands rank among the top recycling countries in the world. From the total amount of waste paper recycling in the Netherlands (approximately 77 percent), Parenco reproduces some 16 percent into new paper.

Brands include:

- parHeat, suitable for heat-set web offset. Applications are e.g. flyers, leaflets and inserts.
- parCal, a SC-B paper suitable for heat-set web offset and rotogravure printing. Applications are e.g. magazines, catalogues, leaflets and inserts.

Parenco’s main markets are located in Europe.

== Bibliography ==
- Dybevik, Carsten; Langfjæran, Jarle (2012). "Norske Skog 50" (PDF). Norske Skog.
- Pollen, Geir (2007). Langt fra stammen (in Norwegian). Oslo: Gyldendal Norsk Forlag. ISBN 978-82-05-34625-3.
