= Boyer Mill =

Pulp and paper mill in Boyer, Tasmania

Boyer
- Built: 1941
- Location: 1279 Boyer Road, Boyer, Tasmania, Australia
- Coordinates: 42°46′42.78″S 147°6′5.42″E
- Industry: Pulp and paper
- Products: Newsprint; Magazine paper
- Employees: 265 (2020)
- Area: 565 hectares (1,400 acres)
- Owner: David Marriner
- Website: www.boyercorporation.au

Trading as Boyer, the Boyer Mill is a pulp and paper mill located in Boyer, Tasmania, Australia. Constructed in 1941 by Australian Newsprint Mills, it was the first producer of newsprint in Australasia. In 2020, the mill produced around 260,000 tonnes (260,000 long tons; 290,000 short tons) of product and remains Australia's only manufacturer of newsprint and magazine-grade paper. The mill's operations contribute significantly to Tasmania's economy, generating an estimated A$390,000,000 in gross state product.

From 2000 to 2025, Boyer Mill was owned and operated by the Norwegian pulp and paper company Norske Skog. In February 2025, Norske Skog sold the mill to a company controlled by Melbourne businessman David Marriner, who established the Boyer Corporation as the new operating entity. The transaction was valued at approximately A$27 million (about NOK 190 million), with Norske Skog citing a strategic focus on its European operations as the reason for the sale.

== History ==
Situated on a 157-acre (64 ha) site, the paper mill was constructed during World War II by Australian Newsprint Mills Pty Ltd (ANM) to produce newsprint for the growing Australian newspaper industry. It was the first pulp and paper mill in the world to use hardwood to produce newsprint.

Like EZ Industries’ Risdon zinc smelter at Lutana and Cadbury's Claremont, ANM chose to locate its mill along the River Derwent to take advantage of inexpensive hydroelectricity. Following the social standards set by Cadbury in the region, ANM established a model village for its 175 employees, featuring housing, recreational facilities and a football oval.

By the 1960s, the introduction of the chainsaw had replaced the crosscut saw, increasing timber extraction efficiency. Boyer Mill expanded with new equipment, though mechanisation and outsourcing gradually reduced its workforce. The Maydena logging base was later incorporated into the Southwest National Park, limiting further forest operations. By the late 1980s, ageing equipment and growing international competition placed the mill under financial pressure. When New Zealand’s largest paper producer, Fletcher Challenge, acquired ANM in 1988, the workforce was reduced from around 3,000 to 600, and the Maydena depot was closed in 1990.

In 2000, the Norwegian paper manufacturer Norske Skog acquired ANM, integrating the Boyer Mill into its global operations. The site continued to supply newsprint and magazine-grade paper to domestic and international markets, with successive investments focused on efficiency and emissions reduction.

In 2010, the mill was recognised by Engineering Heritage Tasmania as a National Engineering Landmark for its pioneering use of hardwood in newsprint production.

In August 2024, 12 ha (30 acres) of surplus land at the site was sold to Incat for the development of a new shipbuilding yard to meet demand for electric vessel production.

In February 2025, Norske Skog sold the Boyer Mill to Melbourne businessman David Marriner, who established the Boyer Corporation as the new operator. The transaction was valued at about NOK 190 million (A$27 million). Norske Skog stated that the sale was consistent with its strategy to refocus on European operations, while Boyer Corporation indicated plans to continue pulp and paper production alongside future industrial diversification.

In August 2026, Winc announced a distribution agreement with the Boyer Paper Mill. The mill is now producing Australian made copy paper available exclusively through Winc, making Boyer the sole white office copy paper manufacturer in Australia, after the closure of Opal's Maryvale mill in 2023.

== Production ==
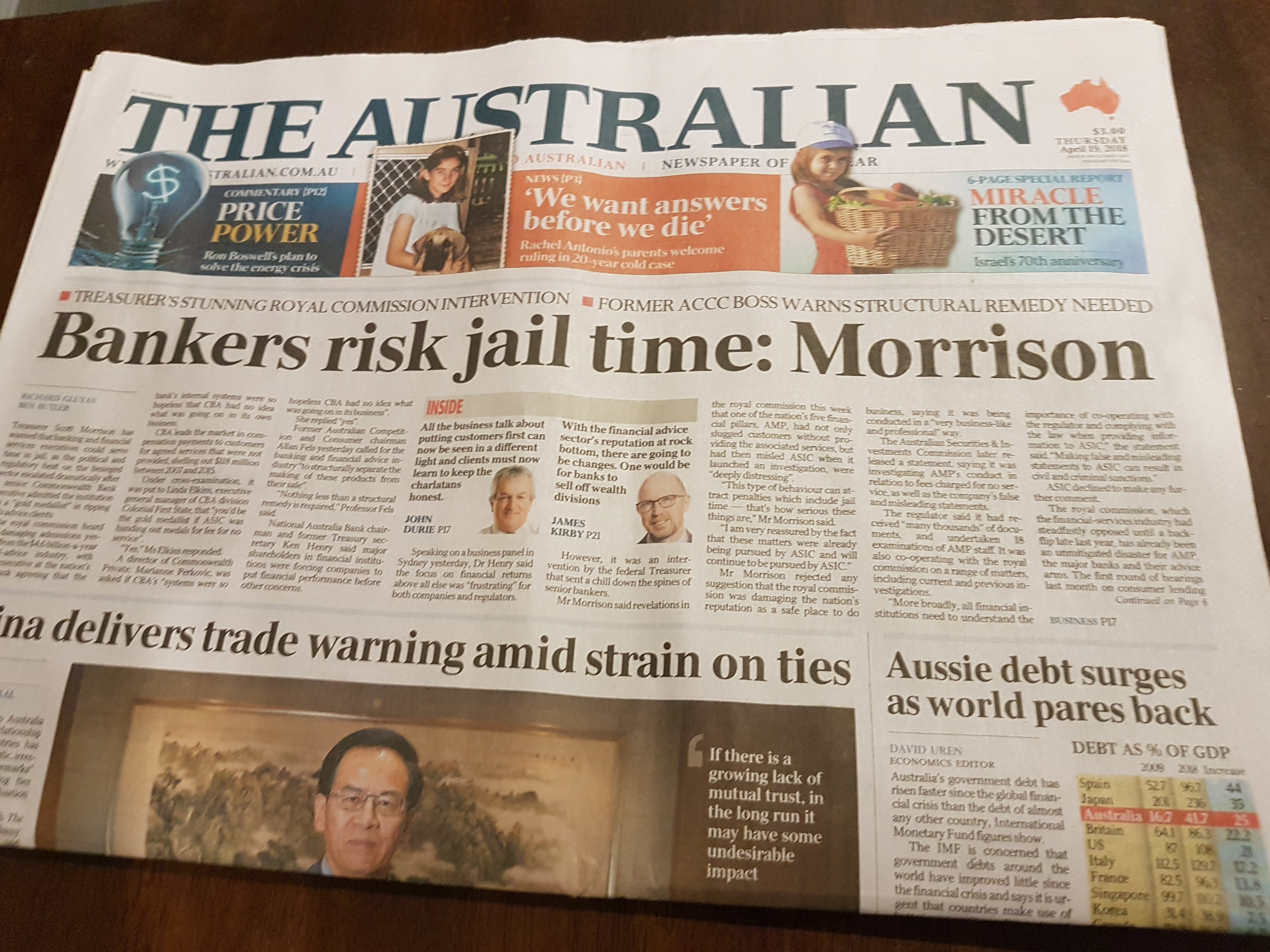
Boyer Mill supplies newsprint for News Corp Australia publications.

The Boyer Mill operates two paper machines and specialises in the production of newsprint and uncoated, high-brightness specialty grades suited for offset printing. The mill continues to play a significant role in the Australian market, with annual output accounting for approximately 40% of the nation's consumption of newsprint and related paper grades.

=== Coal source ===
The Boyer Mill utilises approximately 85,000 tonnes (84,000 long tons; 94,000 short tons) of black coal per annum to fuel its coal-fired boilers. Coal was historically sourced from Cornwall Coal’s Cullenswood mine in the Fingal Valley until 2023, when reserves were depleted. From March 2023, coal was imported from interstate under supply contracts with Yancoal from mines in New South Wales, Queensland, and Western Australia.

=== Upgrades ===
In 1985, Bis Industries constructed a plantation softwood chipping facility at the site, valued at A$22.5 million. The facility is owned, operated, and maintained by Bis and continues to be used by the Boyer Mill for processing plantation timber.

In 2013, Norske Skog invested A$84 million to convert one of the mill’s paper machines to produce lightweight coated paper. The project received a A$28 million grant from the Federal Government and a A$13 million loan from the Tasmanian Government.

In 2022, both the federal Labor and Liberal parties pledged A$2 million in matching funds for further site upgrades, alongside A$2 million from the Tasmanian Government and A$2.9 million contributed by the company itself.

During the 2025 federal election campaign, Prime Minister Anthony Albanese pledged A$24 million towards the mill’s next major upgrade, including the conversion of its boiler infrastructure from coal to electricity.

==== Boiler upgrades ====
In 2023, the mill began a feasibility study to replace its ageing coal-fired boilers with electrode boiler technology. The proposed upgrade aims to transition the site’s energy source from fossil fuels to renewable electricity, reducing emissions and improving long-term operational sustainability. Boyer Corporation has continued these efforts in consultation with Hydro Tasmania and the Tasmanian Government, exploring options to nearly double the mill’s electricity usage through the supply of an additional 50 megawatts (67,000 hp) of renewable power per annum.

As of 2025, the Boyer Mill, identified as Tasmania’s fourth-largest carbon emitter, is actively progressing plans to convert its coal-powered boilers to electric operation after several years of energy security concerns.

=== Transportation ===
From 1941 until 1986, finished paper products were transported by barge along the River Derwent to Hobart for distribution. The mill remains a significant user of Tasmanian rail and road networks, as well as Bass Strait shipping. Each year, more than 1,000,000 tonnes (980,000 long tons; 1,100,000 short tons) of finished product and raw material are transported through these systems.

== Pollution ==
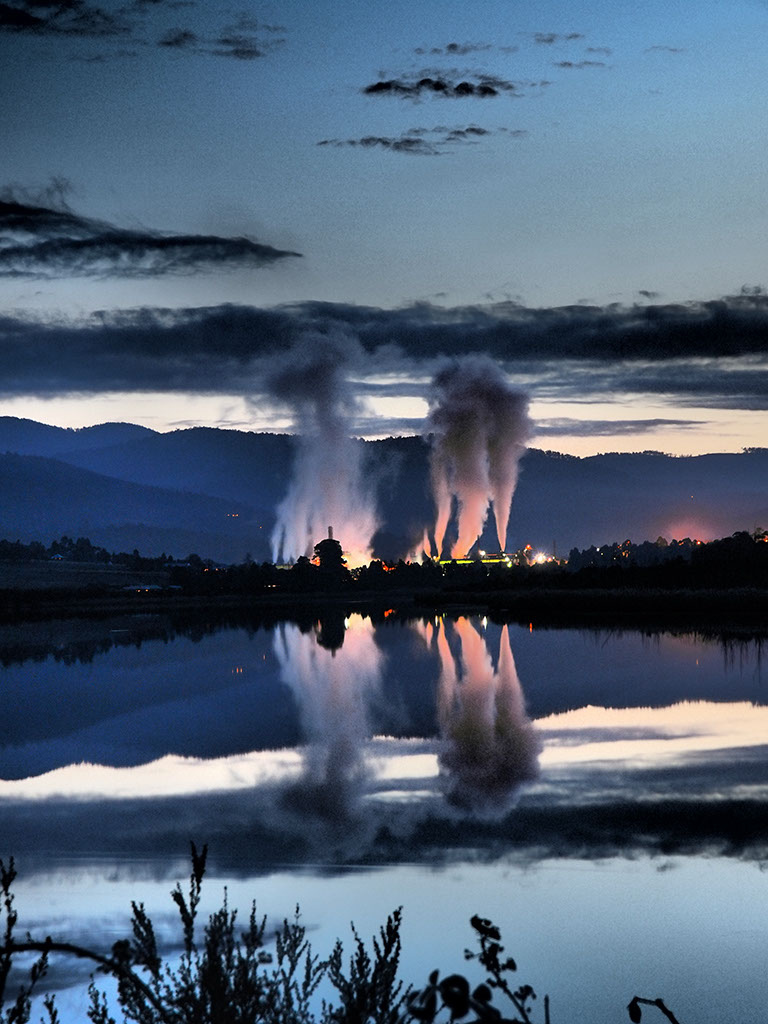
Norske Skog Boyer and the River Derwent captured from the Lyell Highway, 2011

The Boyer Mill has historically contributed to local pollution, affecting both the surrounding environment and human health. Emissions and discharges associated with the site have originated from various stages of the papermaking process, including pulping, bleaching, and wastewater treatment. In 1990, a Commonwealth taskforce was established to assess the mill’s environmental impact.

From 2001, under Norske Skog’s ownership, the mill operated within a certified ISO 14001 environmental management system, subject to external auditing and regulatory oversight. The mill also obtained Sustainable Forest Management and Chain of Custody certifications through the Australian Forestry Standard and the Forest Stewardship Council. Following the transition to Boyer Corporation ownership in 2025, the site remains subject to ongoing environmental regulation and compliance monitoring under Tasmanian and federal legislation.

=== Airborne emissions ===
The Boyer Mill's coal-fired boilers emit various air pollutants in the form of particulate matter and volatile organic compounds (VOCs). Released during combustion, particulate matter consists of fine particles and gases including resin acid, sulfur compounds and nitrogen oxides. VOCs, released during various stages of paper production, are associated with smog, acid rain, greenhouse gases and air quality degradation.

=== Estuary contamination ===
One of the primary concerns is the discharge of effluent into the nearby River Derwent. The mill releases wastewater in the form of sludge and wood residues that contain various pollutants, including organic matter, suspended solids, and chemical substances such as lignin used in the paper-making process. These chemicals deplete oxygen levels in the water, harming aquatic organisms and disrupting ecosystems. Pulp bleaching processes involving chlorine compounds generate toxic chlorinated organic compounds, which further contributed to water pollution. In recent years, the mill has made substantial progress in water conservation, achieving a reduction of over 60% in water usage since 1985.

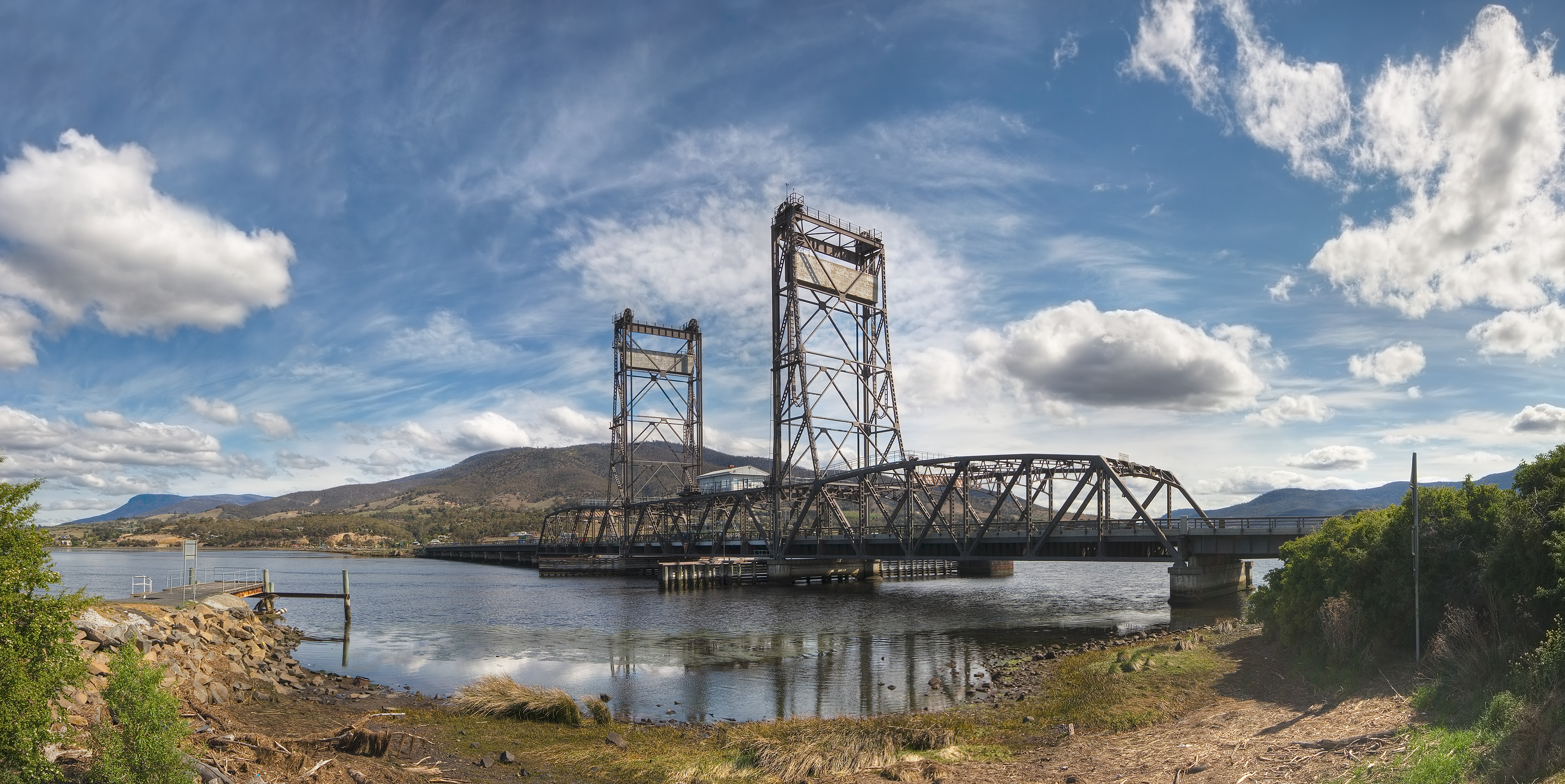
Bridgewater Bridge and causeway in 2008

==== Bridgewater causeway ====
Downstream from the Boyer Mill, the 1830s causeway at Bridgewater links Granton and Bridgewater via the Bridgewater Bridge. Constructed using convict labour, the historic causeway has long acted as a catchment point for sludge and wastewater pollutants within the upper Derwent estuary. Further downstream at Lutana, the Risdon Zinc Works has contributed to substantial heavy-metal contamination. Discharges of methylmercury and other toxic heavy metals into the estuary from the mid-twentieth century led to the Derwent being recognised as one of the most polluted river systems in the world by the late 1970s.

Environmental studies undertaken in 2009, 2012, and 2020 identified that heavy-metal contaminants, including cadmium, lead, zinc and mercury, remain present in sediments near the causeway. The construction of the new Bridgewater Bridge, completed in 2025, required careful management of dredging and piling works to avoid disturbing these contaminants.

=== Deforestation ===
Historically, Tasmania has faced significant deforestation and forest degradation due to various industries, including logging for timber and paper production. The expansion of the paper industry, including the establishment of the Boyer paper mill, greatly contributed to the demand for raw materials, such as pulpwood from native forests.

==== Maydena depot ====
ANM evaluated the development of a logging headquarters near Maydena in 1949, and it was established in 1950, featuring a railway marshalling yard, log storage, loading facilities, offices, a store, oil depot, and a workshop for vehicle maintenance. 32 workers cottages were built nearby to facilitate the loggers. By the mid-1950s, the Boyer Mill was utilising over 120,000,000 board feet (280,000 m^{3}) of sawn timber wood fibre per annum. The Boyer mill primarily sought raw materials from its Maydena depot, until its closure in the late 1980s.

==== Forest assets ====
In 2020, Norske Skog sold its remaining Tasmanian forest assets to the investment manager firm New Forests Pty Ltd for $62.5m. The sale encompassed plantations that traditionally accounted for approximately two-thirds of Boyer's annual consumption of pulpwood, totalling around 550,000 tonnes (540,000 long tons; 610,000 short tons). Following the completion of the transaction, Boyer entered into a long-term agreement with the buyer, guaranteeing an annual supply of 360,000 tonnes (350,000 long tons; 400,000 short tons) of pulpwood.

=== Health risks ===
Pollution from pulp and paper mills can pose health risks to surrounding communities. Exposure to airborne pollutants such as particulate matter and volatile organic compounds (VOCs) has been associated with respiratory and cardiovascular illnesses, while contamination of local waterways can affect both drinking water quality and the safety of fish and other aquatic species consumed by nearby residents. Historical concerns about dust, odour, and water pollution were raised by Boyer Mill workers and members of the local community throughout the mid-twentieth century.

Under Norske Skog’s ownership in the early 2000s, a Health and Safety Employees Fund was created through the amalgamation of individual employee initiatives into a unified mill-wide program aimed at improving workplace wellbeing and safety. Following the 2025 transition to Boyer Corporation, occupational health and safety standards at the site continue to be regulated under Tasmanian and federal workplace legislation.

== Access ==
The Boyer Mill is accessible via Boyer Road, Boyer. There are no public transport routes servicing the Boyer Mill.

== See also ==
- List of paper mills

== Sources ==
- Norske Skog (2022-01-01). "Annual Review for the Boyer Mill 1 January 2021 to 31 December 2021" (PDF). Environment Protection Authority. Norske Skog Paper Mills (Australia) Ltd.
- Australian Newsprint Mills (1993). Australian Newsprint Mills Ltd Boyer Mill : environmental management plan. Australian Newsprint Mills Ltd.
- Coughanowr, Christine (1997). "State of the Derwent Estuary: a review of environmental quality data to 1997". Supervising Scientist (129 ed.). Barton, ACT. ISSN 1325-1554.
- Davies, Peter Eric; Kalish, S. R. (1989). "Water quality of the upper Derwent estuary, Tasmania : final report". Inland Fisheries Commission (Issuing Body). Tasmania.
- Federated Builders' Association of Australia; Master Builders' Federation of Australia (1941), "72 v. : ill.; 25 cm.", Building : the magazine for the architect, builder, property owner and merchant., vol. 68, Sydney, Australia: Building Publishing Co., nla.obj-297523016 – via Trove
