= Haldens Bomuldsspinderi & Væveri =

Norwegian cotton textile company

- Formerly: Mads Wiels Bomuldsfabrique; Tistedalens Bomuldsspinderi; Haldens Bomuldsspinderi
- Company type: Aksjeselskap
- Industry: Textiles
- Founded: 1813
- Defunct: 1971
- Fate: Bankruptcy
- Headquarters: Tistedal, Halden, Østfold, Norway
- Key people: Mads Truelsen Wiel, Gabriel Hofgaard, Paul Hofgaard
- Products: Cotton yarn, woven fabrics, carpets

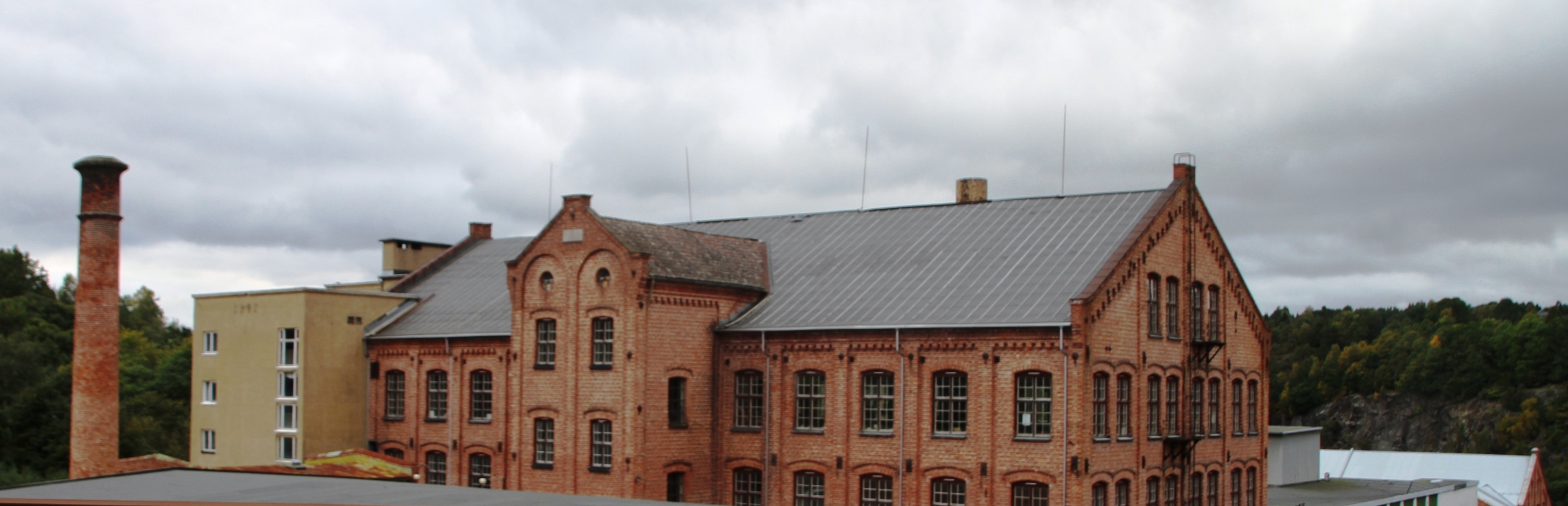

Haldens Bomuldsspinderi & Væveri (Norwegian for "Halden Cotton Spinning Mill & Weaving Mill"), also known as Mads Wiels, is often regarded as Norway's first factory, started in 1813 in Tistedal near Halden. The factory operated for over 150 years before the textile crisis caught up with it in 1971. Today the plant is part of the Østfold Museums.

What should count as industry or a factory is to some degree a matter of definition, but by criteria such as mechanical production equipment, waterpower, a factory building, workers, and the mass production of finished goods from raw materials, the company is a strong candidate for the title of Norway's first modern factory.

== Mads Wiel's spinning mill ==
Mads Truelsen Wiel (1791–1835) of Halden managed in his relatively short life to make a major pioneering contribution to the Norwegian textile industry. When Mads was 16, his father Truels died, having worked his way up to become one of Halden's foremost merchants through many different ventures, particularly in forestry and shipping. This starting capital enabled Mads, at 16 or 17, to become an entrepreneur. He is said to have gained inspiration and knowledge of new textile technology during a period of study in Copenhagen in 1812, where he also made contacts with suppliers and fitters of factory equipment connected to the Swedish textile pioneer in Denmark, Charles Nordberg, and his successors.

Wiel started with woolens in a small wool-spinning mill and cloth factory in Halden in 1812–1813. Three manual stocking looms were at work in the wool factory until about 1820, and around the same time he acquired the first machines for a cotton-spinning mill, which needed waterpower. This he could get from the Tistedal falls, where he already held several waterfall rights in connection with the sawmill business his father had been involved in.

Construction of the cotton mill in Tistedal began in 1813. It was a three-story wooden building on stone pillars on the north side of the falls, with a footprint of about 18 by 8 meters. Large windows, seven on each floor along the long sides with 20 panes each, gave good working light. The spinning machines stood on the first floor, while the two upper floors held a cotton-cleaning room and a wool-spinning mill, along with manual looms where weavers produced stockings, woolen clothing, and cotton cloth in the traditional craft manner in the early years. Under the first floor stood the waterwheel connected to the spinning machines, with water chutes from the falls feeding it.

Because of the upheavals of the Napoleonic Wars in Europe, it took a long time to get the factory going, and there were also great problems financing the construction and operation. The secure income the family had had from the timber trade disappeared during 1814, and Wiel tried without success to borrow money to pay for the machines he had bought, among others from the Danish crown prince Christian Frederik, who became Norway's new king in the summer of 1814. A functioning banking and credit system was one of the preconditions lacking at this time, which was better established around 1840 when industry had its definitive breakthrough.

Despite the start-up difficulties, the spinning mill got going in the autumn of 1815. A bale of cotton was delivered in October and another in December, suggesting a cautious start, with three spinning machines said to have been running at the beginning. Various dyes were also delivered for the dye works, which did not start until the following year. 1816 was the first normal year of operation, with all the spinning machines at work and 30 to 40 workers, including a weaving master and various craftsmen, women, and children who cleaned cotton.

All in all, Wiel's pioneering years in Tistedal can be seen as confirmation of the saying that it does not pay to be a pioneer. Although his venture was well planned and designed, and technically at the forefront in every way, the timing was unfortunate in every respect. With the great political and economic upheavals around 1814 and the downturns that followed in the 1820s, it was hard enough to run established businesses; to start up a cotton industry dependent on imported raw material was nearly impossible, at least as a profitable concern. On top of it all, Wiel's businesses, including both raw-material and finished-goods stocks, were hit by fire. Wiel was uninsured and lost a great deal of money, and the factory stood idle for long periods after 1818. When Wiel died in 1835, he had nonetheless kept the business alive in sporadic operation for 20 years and laid the foundation for what would remain one of the country's most important textile companies. Further operation was leased out by the estate until it was sold by Wiel's heirs, through the eldest son, the sawmiller Truels Wiel, when the widow died in 1845.

== Tistedalens Bomuldsspinderi ==
The new owners, Boesen and Leegaard, who took over in 1845, in effect started the business anew under the name Tistedalens Bomuldsspinderi. They renewed the machinery and brought in a Swedish spinning master who came to Halden with several experienced spinners, and together they set the factory going in 1846, using American raw cotton. But the income did not match the investments, and the plant soon passed into the hands of the creditors.

== Haldens Bomuldsspinderi, 1850 ==
The third owners also belonged to Halden's merchant class, led by the merchant Knud Knudsen, with Ole Rasch as technical head of the factory, a role he soon handed over to an English spinning master. This fit well with the upturn of the 1850s, which brought growth in demand and thus good sale prices as well as record-low raw-cotton prices, and production capacity was doubled.

In 1854 the whole factory burned to the ground, but unlike when Wiel was struck by fire in 1817, the company was so well insured that it became a great advantage. The wooden building from 1814 was outdated against the new demands for modern textile factories, and now the factory could be rebuilt anew. Rasch went to England and bought new machines, just as Hiorth, Graah, and Schou had done at the Akerselva, and Haldens Bomuldsspinderi came fully up to the level of its competitors. Until the cotton crisis during the American Civil War from 1861 to 1865, the textile industry did very well.

== Joint-stock company and weaving mill ==
After the upheavals of the American Civil War, the company changed. The old guard of merchants and wholesalers, who had handled operations and the sale of goods through their own businesses, had died out or withdrawn, and new times called for new ideas and new people. In 1870 Haldens Bomuldsspinneri became a joint-stock company led by Gabriel Hofgaard (1823–1890) of Drammen, who had come to Halden at the age of 15 and learned from the town's commercial life. Hofgaard had taken over a draper's business and also ran a hardware trade and a mill.

Under Hofgaard's leadership, turnover and profitability grew year by year, and the markets were expanded both at home and abroad, for it was not only the shops in Halden that were to sell the production. The Interstate Act made trade with the union partner Sweden far easier and was favorable to the people of Halden. The factory was expanded with a weaving mill, and expanded further after another fire in 1877. More and more of the spinning-mill products were used in-house, which also increased profitability, a point underscored when the company's name was changed to Haldens Bomuldsspinderi & Væveri, and soon 120 looms were at work.

That the company called itself a weaving mill only at this time does not mean that no weaving was done earlier. Mads Wiel's looms, however, were manual looms, and thus more craft than industry. When the Halden factory got "Væveri" in its name, it was after a large number of mechanical looms had been installed, which could be operated by female workers. Further expansions followed in the 1880s. Hofgaard sold his mill, on the neighboring site, to the company, a new four-story spinning building was raised, and the old factory expanded with room for 300 looms. The share capital was increased, and among the new owners was Mads Wiel's son. The business had grown from a small pioneer company facing headwinds into a leading textile company among the many established around the country during the industrial breakthrough of the 19th century.

== Heyday in Halden ==
Paul Hofgaard (1857–1935) took over the leadership as the next generation in 1890. He had been brought up in the business, including as the firm's agent in Oslo, and at his father's death he was ready to lead the company into the next century. He remained for 38 years, through the First World War and the turbulent years that followed, until 1928.

At the start of this period the expansion continued. The number of looms was increased to over 500, and the weaving mill's production grew from 2.3 million meters in 1899 to 3.9 million meters in 1916. Especially after 1905, the mood in Norway following the dissolution of the union is said to have had a positive effect, as people were encouraged to buy Norwegian goods. The company at this time had nearly 400 employees, three-quarters of them women. The power situation at the Tistedal falls was improved through new agreements with the main competitor over the somewhat unstable waterpower, Saugbrugsforeningen. New dams and regulations in the Tista watercourse, along with improved turbine technology and electrification, allowed both parties to use the waterpower better and more evenly.

== The interwar years ==
During the First World War, raw-material prices rose very sharply. The company had good stocks, however, and used the situation to buy machines, and it was not difficult to sell the finished goods on the home market at prices that covered both higher raw-material costs and higher wages for the workers.

It would be far worse in the decade after the First World War. Falling prices, overproduction, and increased competition from abroad due to unstable currency and tariff conditions left both the textile industry and many large customers struggling for income, the latter meaning that the Halden factory was not paid what many of its largest customers owed for goods delivered. Despite large "losses on outstanding receivables," the company was able to pay dividends to shareholders. Paul Hofgaard retired in 1929 and handed the helm to the third generation, his son, the textile engineer Gabriel Hofgaard.

New products such as woven carpets, and further rationalization of operations, were enough to meet the competition through the 1930s. During the Second World War the raw-material situation again became difficult, but the company managed to keep going, experimenting a good deal with substitute materials for wool and cotton, both the cellulose products that became common in textiles after the war and the shorter-lived paper products used in spinning and textile production, to some extent for shoes but chiefly for packaging.

== Last period of textile investment ==
As import restrictions and rationing ended toward 1950, the textile factories returned to more normal operation through the 1950s. Labor could at times be hard to find, so rationalization came strongly into focus again, with time studies and investments in machinery. The result of this work shows in the fact that in 1960 there were 400 workers against 600 in 1946, while production had risen 86 percent in the spinning mill and 132 percent in the weaving mill.

In this last heyday the factory in Tistedal was a broad textile enterprise. It spun thread of wool, cotton, and synthetic fiber, wove and dyed both standard everyday textiles and finer ones such as tablecloths and curtain fabrics, and had its own large carpet factory. In the first years after the war there were no profitability problems: demand was high, and everything that could be produced was sold at good prices.

== 150th anniversary ==
In 1963 the factory celebrated its 150th anniversary in great optimism. The company was still led at this time by Gabriel Hofgaard, with the next generation, Paul Hofgaard, on his way to becoming factory manager. The Wiel family too was still represented on the board, by the landowner Mads Wiel, one of the founder's descendants, so that the company's long history was clearly visible on the ownership and governance side even after 150 years.

An anniversary booklet presented the company's long traditions and the modern large enterprise with 420 employees, though in seemingly unmodern premises. The building stock had developed over 150 years up to 26,000 square meters, with spinning mill, weaving mill, storage, and other functions. The spinning mill had 41 spinning machines and could produce 1.2 million kilograms of yarn a year, while the weaving mill had 157 looms, most of them less than five years old, producing a wide range of fabrics from light linens to heavy tablecloths. Dye works, finishing departments, a carpet-weaving mill, storage, and offices completed the picture of a large integrated industrial company. Despite the anniversary celebration, both the complex industrial plant and the broad product range hindered efficient production, and hard competition also weighed on the company.

== Textile crisis and closure ==
The price competition from increased imports made itself more strongly felt, especially on the simpler cotton piece goods, and like most other Norwegian textile factories, Haldens Bomuldsspinderi & Væveri began to struggle to make money. The company was burdened by old buildings and an aging workforce that, especially on the salaried side, was too much protected from layoffs and rationalization as long as the Hofgaard spirit prevailed. Attempts at further rationalization came to nothing, and further investment in more efficient production equipment increased the debt burden.

On 1 October 1971, Aftenposten reported on its front page that Halden Bomuld was laying off all of its 350 employees. Behind this dramatic headline lay both a deeply depressed mood among the employees who had received the shock news and the recognition that the downturn for the Norwegian textile industry, which had prevailed for two decades, had reached the country's oldest factory.

An attempt to save operations through cooperation with the country's second-oldest spinning mill, Solberg in Nedre Eiker, came to nothing. Haldens Bomuldsspinderi went bankrupt, and the main creditor Kredittkassen took over the estate. A new company was established under the name Halden Tekstil, but it did not last long: 120 workers carried on, but without much hope for the future, and after only three months it too was finished, and the last 120 lost their jobs. For them it was all the more bitter, as they had now come to the back of the queue of job seekers. The bankruptcy drew enough attention in the media and in the Storting that a "Halden project" was launched, in which the minister of local government Oddvar Nordli, among others, mobilized the Regional Development Fund to help create new companies and jobs. This gave some results in the district, but in any case time had run out for Haldens Bomuldsspinderi.

== Bibliography ==
- Parmer, Trine (1981). "Mads Wiels Bomuldsfabrik. Norges første moderne industribedrift?", in Volund (Norwegian Museum of Technology yearbook).
- Grieg, Sigurd (1948). Norsk tekstil. Johan Grundt Tanum.
