= Norske Skog =

Norwegian pulp and paper company

Coordinates: 59°53′50.25″N 10°36′18.97″E

Norske Skog ASA
- Company type: Allmennaksjeselskap
- Traded as: OSE: NSKOG
- Industry: Pulp and paper
- Founded: 1962
- Headquarters: Oslo, Norway
- Key people: Sven Ombudstvedt (President and CEO), Jen-Yue (John) Chiang (Chairman)
- Products: Newsprint and magazine paper and related fiber products
- Revenue: NOK 9.612 billion (2020)
- Operating income: NOK -1.339 billion (2020)
- Net income: NOK -1.884 billion (2020)
- Total assets: NOK 7.787 billion (2020)
- Total equity: NOK 3.219 billion (2020)
- Number of employees: 2332 (2020)
- Website: www.norskeskog.com

Norske Skog ASA, formerly Norske Skogindustrier ASA, which translates as Norwegian Forest Industries, is a Norwegian pulp and paper company established in 1962. The company has long been one of the world's leading manufacturers of newsprint and magazine paper. Due to a declining market for publication paper, the company has increasingly focused on other uses of timber and recycled paper, such as packaging. The company is headquartered in Norway and has factories in five countries and an annual production of approximately 2 million tonnes of paper (2020).

== History ==
Norske Skog started in 1962 with the construction of a paper mill at Skogn in Norway, with the plant opening in 1966 and a second paper machine added in 1967. Half the capital for the project was issued by the Norwegian Forest Owners Association. In 1972 Norske Skog started a cooperation with Follum Fabrikker in Hønefoss. By 1989 Norske Skog had acquired Follum Fabrikker and Union in Skien as well as Saugbrugsforeningen in Halden. With this Norske Skog controlled all the pulp and paper mills in Norway.

The first international acquisition came in 1992 with Norske Skog Golbey in Lorraine, France. The company later bought the entire plant in 1995. Norske Skog expanded with purchases in Austria in 1996 and the Czech Republic in 1997. In 1998 it purchased mills in Thailand and the Republic of Korea.

In 2000 Norske Skog bought the British Columbia-based Fletcher Challenge Canada with nine mills and Pacifica Papers (formerly MacMillan Bloedel) and created NorskeCanada. At the same time it absorbed the Australian Newsprint Mills, a subsidiary of Fletcher Challenge. By 2006 Norske Skog had sold its shares in NorskeCanada and the company changed its name to Catalyst Paper.

In September 2005 it acquired the Asian company PanAsia Paper, in turn making Norske Skog Asia's largest producer of newsprint and magazine paper.

During the following years, the company suffered from an oversupply in the paper industry and mounting debt. A number of factories were closed, downsized or divested. The closure of the Union paper mill in Skien in 2005 caused a massive outcry, including protests from a number of politicians. Further closures include the closure of a factory in Štětí in the Czech Republic, the indefinite closure of a factory in South Korea, and the closure of one of the three paper machines at Follum. From March 2007 to March 2008, the stock value plummeted from over kr 100 to below kr 18. An editorial in the Norwegian business newspaper Finansavisen could not rule out the possibility of bankruptcy. In September 2008, Norske Skog Korea was bought by Morgan Stanley Private Equity of Asia and Shinhan Private Equity.

Sven Ombudstvedt became CEO of Norske Skog in January 2010. Ombudstvedt was previously chief financial officer and a management board member of Yara International and strategy director of Norsk Hydro. Ombudstvedt succeeded Christian Rynning-Tønnesen.

Norske Skogindustrier ASA went bankrupt in 2017 and was delisted from the Oslo Stock Exchange. However, the operations continued, and was reorganized under a new parent company, Norske Skog ASA, which was reintroduced to the Oslo Stock Exchange in October 2019.

Over the following years, the group has diversified in order to counter the downward trend of the publication paper market. In 2020, it was announced that two paper machines, at Bruck an der Mur in Austria and Golbey in France, would be converted to produce recycled containerboard. The company is also pursuing fibre-based growth initiatives under the brand names Cebina and Cebico as well as energy related projects such as biogas. Norske Skog is also the major shareholder of Circa Group, which is listed separately on Euronext Growth with the ticker CIRCA.

=== Environmental record ===
Norske Skog have been accused of environmental destruction in New Zealand. One of their plants has consumed an entire inland fresh water lake, once full of marine life and a healthy eco system and replaced it with a large stagnant pit full of dioxins, polychlorinated biphenyls (PCB). Drums of zinc hydrosulphite and sodium dichromate are buried in the lake bed. Testing has also detected manganese, ammoniacal nitrogen, boron, arsenic, zinc, and chloride, these exceed the maximum concentration limits for drinking water, further polluting the ground water and feeding in to other areas.

Norske Skog have effectively walked away from the responsibility to clean up the work site, by closing the paper mill plant, they are refusing to engage with local indigenous Maori, guardians of the environment.

Norske Skog continue to ignore requests and written plans, to remediate the land. Norske Skog hide behind out dated and old legislation that gave them the legal means to pollute on such a huge scale. Around 600,000m3 of toxic sludge was dumped into Lake Rotoitipaku over 30 years. Norske Skog operates on 3.54 Billion of revenue as of September 2022

== List of mills ==
As of 2021

- Norske Skog Skogn (Levanger, Norway)
- Norske Skog Saugbrugs (Halden, Norway)
- Norske Skog Bruck (Bruck an der Mur, Austria)
- Norske Skog Golbey (Golbey, France)

=== Former mills ===
This list may be incomplete

- Boyer Mill (Tasmania, Australia), purchased 2000, sold 2025
- Norske Skog Follum (Hønefoss, Norway)
- Norske Skog Union (Skien, Norway) (closed 2006)
- Södra Cell Folla (Verran, Norway) (sold 2000)
- Södra Cell Tofte (Tofte, Norway) (sold 2000)
- Catalyst Crofton (Crofton, Canada) (demerged)
- Catalyst Elk Falls (Elk Falls, Canada) (demerged)
- Catalyst Port Alberni (Port Alberni, Canada) (demerged)
- Catalyst Powell River (Powell River, Canada) (demerged)
- (South Korea) Jeonju Mill (Jeollabuk-do, Republic of Korea) (renamed to Jeonju Paper)
- (South Korea) Cheongwon Mill (Chungcheongbuk-do, Republic of Korea) (renamed to Jeonju Paper)
- Norske Skog Parenco (Renkum, Netherlands)
- Norske Skog Štětí (Štětí, Czech Republic)
- Norske Skog Walsum (Duisburg, Germany)
- Norske Skog Bio Bio (Concepción, Chile)
- Norske Skog Pisa (Jaguariaiva, Brazil)
- Norske Skog Albury (Table Top, New South Wales, Australia)
- Norske Skog Tasman (Kawerau, New Zealand)
- Hebei Mill (Zhao County, China)
- Shanghai Mill (Shanghai, China)
- Singburi Mill (Sing Buri, Thailand)

== See also ==
- List of paper mills
