= Singburi Mill =

Pulp and paper mill in Thailand

- Location within Thailand
- Built: 1994
- Location: Sing Buri, Thailand
- Coordinates: 14.9424°N 100.3732°E
- Industry: Pulp and paper
- Products: Newsprint
- Employees: 239 (2013)
- Owner: CAS Group

Singburi Mill is a pulp mill and paper mill situated in Sing Buri, Thailand. Owned by the CAS Group, the mill sources its fiber from deinking to feed a single paper machine producing newsprint. PM1 has an annual production of 125,000 tonnes. The mill had 239 employees in 2013, and was the sole manufacturer of newsprint in Thailand, approximately producing the entire country's consumption.

== History ==
During the early 1990s Thailand was dependent on importing all its newsprint from Europe and North America, with an annual consumption of about 300,000 tonnes. The mill was established as Shin Ho Thailand as a joint venture between South Korea's Shin Ho Paper, various South Korean and Thai banks, the Thai Rath and the International Finance Corporation. Completed in 1994, the mill featured a Valmet paper machine running entirely on deinked pulp, sourced entirely from the United States. Old newsprint from Thailand could not be used, as there had not been established any means of recycling the paper domestically.

Shin Ho was struck hard by the 1997 Asian financial crisis, with steed decline in newsprint demand, especially in Thailand. For instance ten of the twenty-five largest Thai newspapers went bankrupt during the period. They sold two of their mills, Cheongwon Mill in South Korea and Singburi Mill, to the Norwegian pulp and paper company Norske Skog. The transfer of ownership of Singburi Mill took place on 17 August 1998.

These assets were merged into PanAsia Paper from 1 February 1999. Ownership passed to Norske Skog again in January 2006. Norske Skog started selling its Asian operations in 2008 and since 2010 Singburi Mill was the sole Norske Skog mill in Asia. Effective 21 November 2013, Norske Skog sold the mill for 33 million United States dollars to Charoen Aksorn Holding Group (CAS Group).

== Bibliography ==
- Dybevik, Carsten; Langfjæran, Jarle (2012). "Norske Skog 50" (PDF). Norske Skog.
- Pollen, Geir (2007). Langt fra stammen (in Norwegian). Oslo: Gyldendal Norsk Forlag. ISBN 978-82-05-34625-3.
