= Sven Ombudstvedt =

Norwegian businessman (born 1966)

Sven Ombudstvedt (born 1966) is a Norwegian businessman. He is the chief executive officer of Norske Skog (2010–present).

He worked in Norsk Hydro from 1991 to 2003 and Yara International from 2003. In 2006 he was promoted to chief financial officer in Yara International. In 2008 he tried to become the new chief executive officer of the company after Thorleif Enger, but did not succeed. He then left Yara. In late 2009 he was announced as the new chief executive officer of Norske Skog, assuming the position on 1 January 2010.

He resides in Drøbak, outside of Oslo.

Business positions
Preceded by Christian Rynning-Tønnesen	CEO of Norske Skog; 2010–present	Incumbent
