= Jeonju Mill =

Pulp and paper mill in Jeonju, South Korea

- Location within South Korea
- Built: 1965
- Location: Jeonju, North Jeolla Province, South Korea
- Coordinates: 35.8484°N 127.0986°E
- Industry: Pulp and paper
- Products: Paper: Newsprint; Magazine paper
- Owner: Jeonju Paper

Jeonju Mill is a pulp mill and paper mill situated in Jeonju, South Korea. Owned by Jeonju Paper, the mill produces 850,000 tonnes of newsprint and magazine paper annually. The mill sources fibers both from virgin wood, including sawmill residue, as well as from deinking. The mill has four paper machines. The mill has the third-largest production capacity for newsprint in the world and the largest deinking mill in the world.

== History ==
Jeonju Mill was established in January 1965 as Seahan Paper. Production with PM1 started in 1968, when the company took the name Jeonju Paper. It was the first thermomechanical pulp mill in South Korea, sourcing its fiber from domestic red pine. The mill had an initial production capacity of 150,000 tonnes. Later expansions at the mill were based around deinkled pulp. The mill was bought by Hansol in October 1992, changing the group's name to Hansol Paper. The mill became part of PanAsia Paper from 1 February 1999. Operations in Korea were established through the company PanAsia Paper Korea. Norske Skog bought out Abitibi Consolidated from PanAsia in January 2006, integrating the Jeonju Mill into the group as Norske Skog Jeonju. The Korean operations were the first of Norske Skog's mills to be demerged, in June 2008. Jeonju Mill then became part of Jeonju Paper.

== Production ==
The following is a list paper machines (PM) operated by Jeonju Paper. It lists, for each paper machine, the type of paper produced, the annual production in tonnes, the trim width in millimeters and the speed in meters per minute.

Paper machines
| PM | Product | Production | Trim width | Speed |
|---|---|---|---|---|
| PM3 | GWS | 97,000 | 4728 | 610 |
| PM5 | Newsprint/GWS | 186,000 | 7880 | 1093 |
| PM6 | Newsprint | 272,000 | 7880 | 1528 |
| PM7 | Newsprint | 285,000 | 7880 | 1567 |

== Bibliography ==
- Dybevik, Carsten; Langfjæran, Jarle (2012). "Norske Skog 50" (PDF). Norske Skog.
- Pollen, Geir (2007). Langt fra stammen (in Norwegian). Oslo: Gyldendal Norsk Forlag. ISBN 978-82-05-34625-3.
