= Walsum power plant =

Coordinates: 51°31′43″N 6°42′42″E

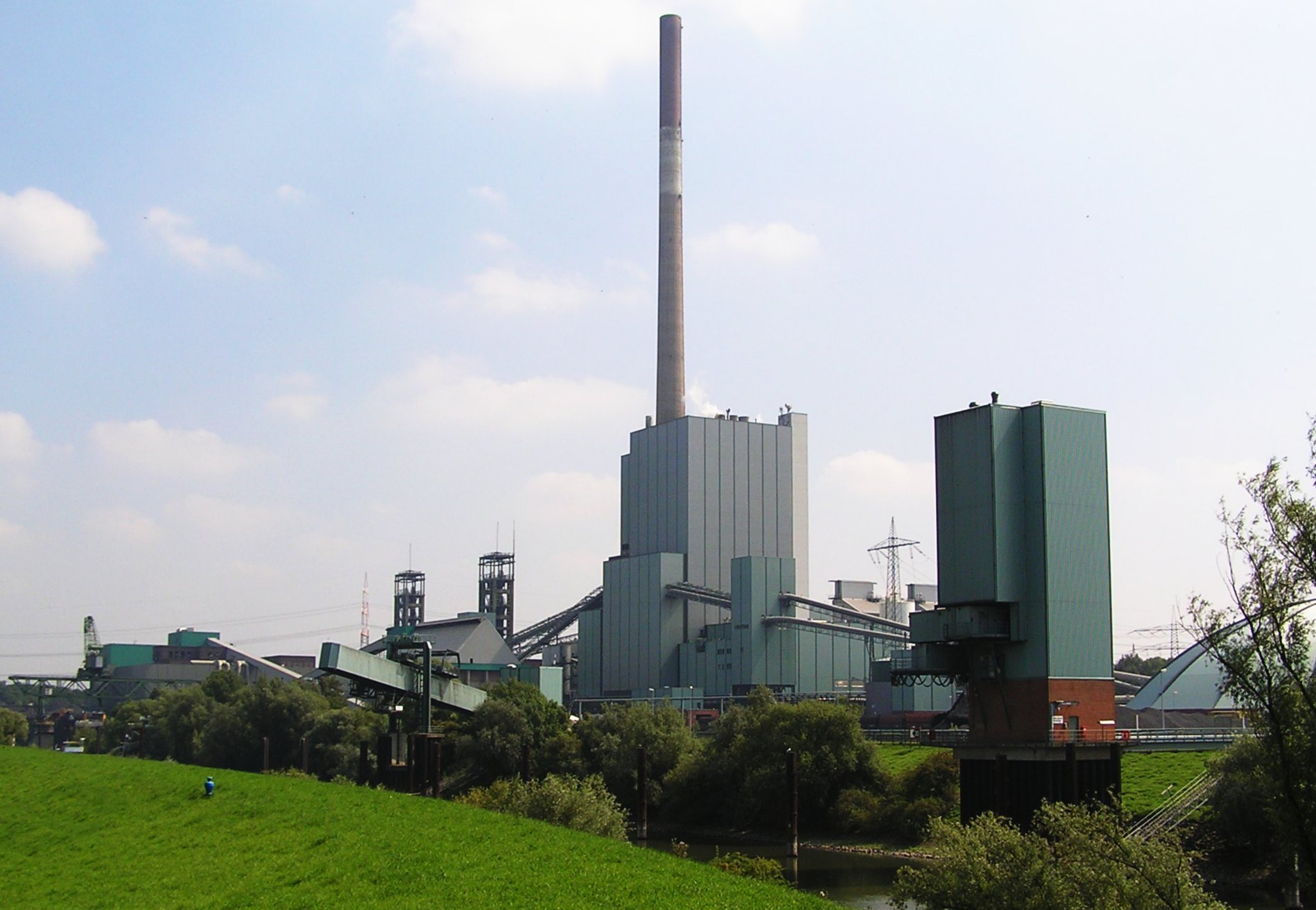
Power Plant Walsum

Walsum power plant is a coal-fired power station owned by Evonik Industries. It is in the Walsum quarter of Duisburg, on the area of the former Walsum coal mine.

== Structure ==
It has an installed output capacity of 600 megawatts (MW). The chimney is 300 metres high, one of the highest chimneys in Germany. The power station supplies not only electricity but also process steam for the Norske Skog paper factory as well as long-distance heating and electricity to Fernwärmeschiene Niederrhein and the Walsum coal mine. From approximately 930,000 tons of coal, the power station produces approximately 2.2 billion a kWh electricity, 33 million a kWh of long-distance heating, 500,000 t process steam and 250 million m³ compressed air per year. It has a coal storage capacity of 34.000 t.

== History ==
At the Duisburg Walsum location, a power plant was established in 1928 to meet the steam needs of the Walsum coal mine. In 1957, the plant was expanded with a power station block (Block 6) with 68 MW. In 1959 and 1960, two additional power station blocks (Blocks 7 and 8) with 150 MW each were added. In 1988, Block 9, with an output of 410 MW, replaced Blocks 6 and 8. Construction of Block 10, with a capacity of 750 MW, began in 2007. Block 10 was scheduled to be operational by the end of 2013 after resolving serious issues with the high-tech steel of the boiler. On June 30, 2007, the Walsum coal mine ceased operations.
