= David Marriner =

Australian property developer and former theatre owner

- Citizenship: Australian
- Occupations: Property developer; theatre owner
- Organization: Marriner Group
- Known for: Restoration of historic Melbourne theatres
- Notable work: Restoration of the Princess Theatre; restoration of the Regent Theatre
- Children: Jason Marriner

David Marriner is a property developer and theatre owner based in Melbourne, Australia, known for his role in restoring several historic theatres.

== Career ==
His career began in the 1980s with property investments and developments, including the Cumberland Centre in the seaside town of Lorne. In 1986, he purchased the historic but languishing Princess Theatre in Spring Street, restoring and upgrading it to be suitable for the large scale musicals then gaining popularity overseas. The theatre reopened on 9 December 1989 with the musical Les Misérables, followed by The Phantom of the Opera.

Through the 1990s Marriner was involved in various high-profile developments in the Melbourne central business district, notably complex deals with the State Government and the City of Melbourne involving the Queen Victoria Hospital site, and the redevelopment of the City Square.

The latter project saw his development company build the Westin Hotel and apartments on half the old Square site, and restore and then manage the adjacent Regent Theatre, which had been abandoned for 20 years. The theatre became another venue for large scale musicals, opening in 1996. In 1995 he bought the historic Forum cinema nearby, and in 1996 the historic Comedy theatre, owning four out of the six historic theatres known as Melbourne's East End theatre district. Since at least 2017, David's son Jason Marriner has been the CEO of the Marriner Group, which manages the theatres. The company was greatly affected by the COVID lockdowns.

=== Other investments ===
David Marriner has also invested in Queensland resorts. He has frequently been in the news for his deals, proposals, and court cases. In April 2025 Marriner purchased the Boyer Mill in Tasmania.
