= Tista =

Tista Tistedalselv, Tistedalselva
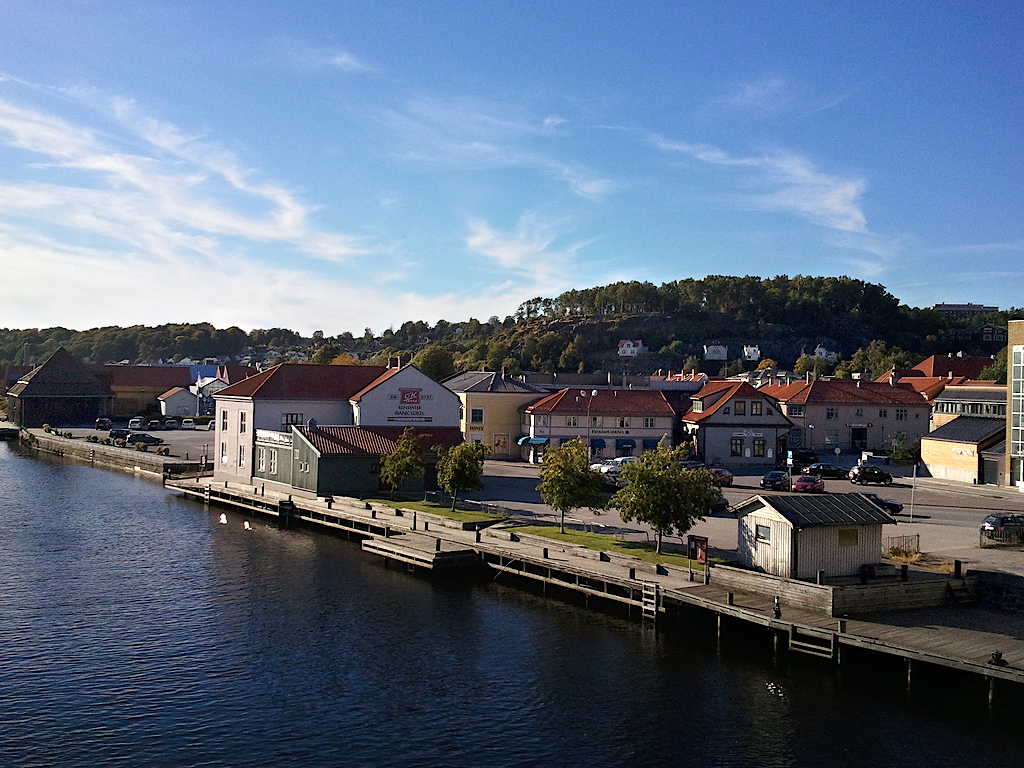
- Tista river in Halden, Norway

Location
- Country: Norway
- County: Østfold
- Municipality: Halden

Physical characteristics
- Source: Femsjøen lake
  - location: Halden
  - coordinates: 59°8′4″N 11°27′41″E
- Mouth: Iddefjord
  - location: Halden
  - coordinates: 59°03′N 11°24′E
- Length: 5 km (3.1 mi)

Basin features
- River system: Haldenvassdraget
- Landmarks: Fredriksten fortress

Tista, also called Tistedalselva or Tistakanalen, is a river in Halden municipality, in Østfold county, Norway. It is the main river in the Haldenvassdraget system and flows from Femsjøen lake to Iddefjorden fjord. The river is less than 5 km long, calculated from the dam in Femsjøen to the mouth of the fjord.
