= Norske Skog Follum =

Paper mill in Follum, Norway

- Company type: Subsidiary
- Industry: Pulp and paper
- Founded: 1873
- Headquarters: Hønefoss, Norway
- Key people: Oddvar Sandvei (Manager)
- Products: Newsprint
- Website: www.norskeskog.com

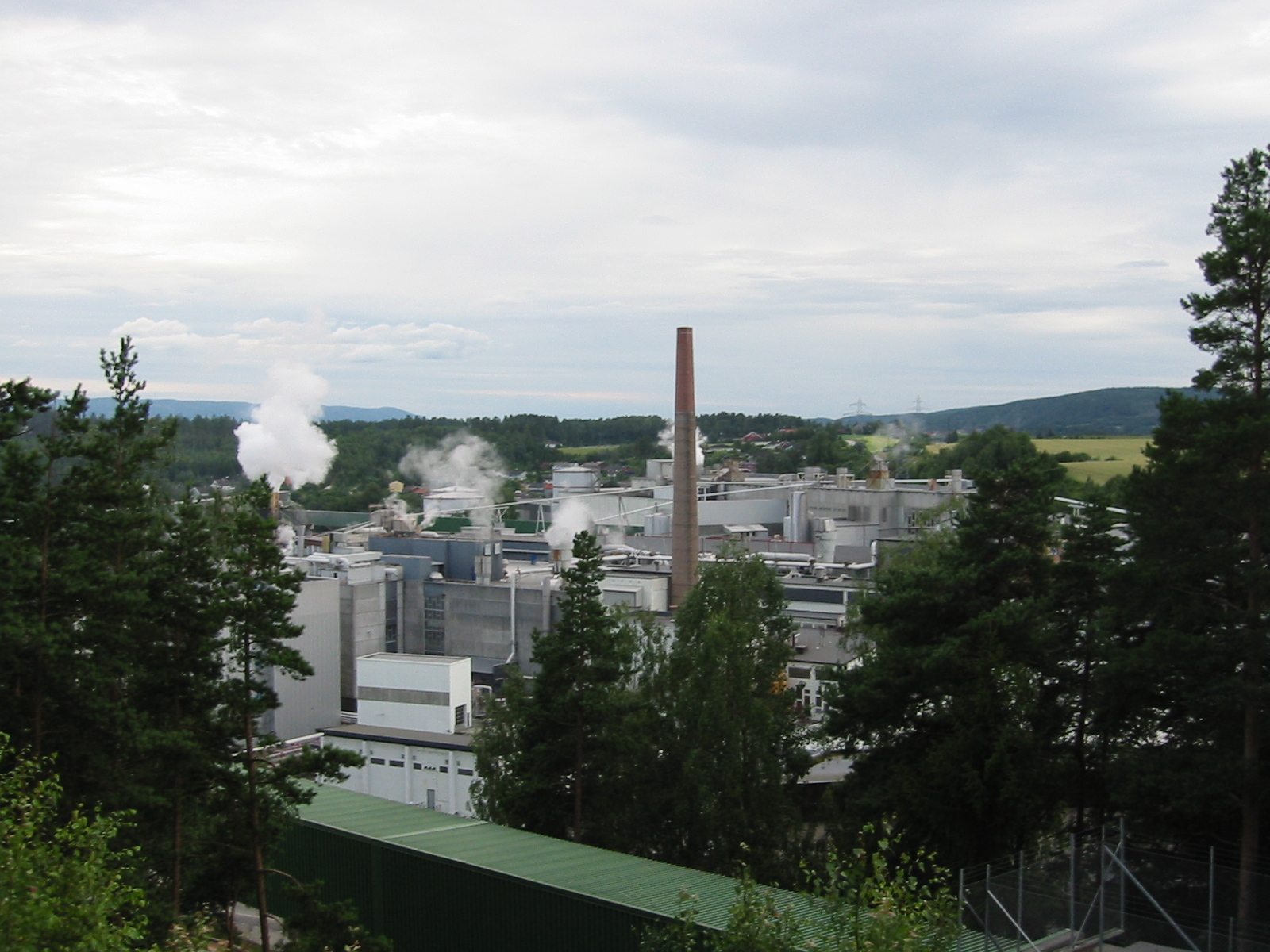

Norske Skog Follum is a paper mill located in Follum in Norway. The mill is part of the Norske Skog Corporation and opened in 1873 with the name Follum Fabrikker (also Follum træsliberi). It has three paper machines and produces 410,000 tonnes of newsprint annually.

The paper is transported by railway to Oslo Harbor where it is shipped out.

== History ==
Follum Fabrikker was started in 1873 and operated as a separate company until it was purchased by Norske Skog in 1989. In 1995 PM7 went through a major renovation.
