= Femsjøen =

Lake in Halden, Norway

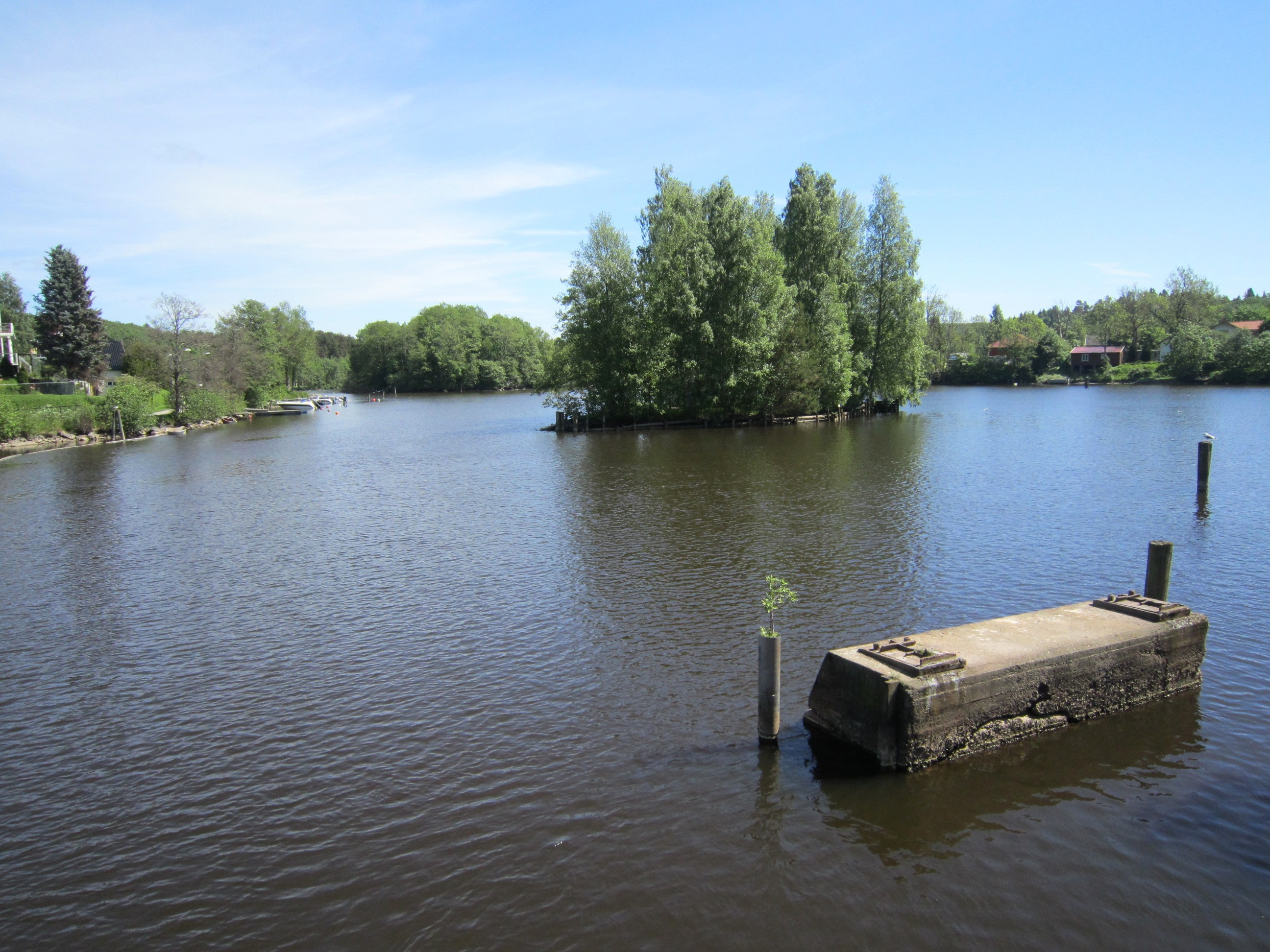

- Location within Østfold
- Location: Halden (Østfold)
- Coordinates: 59°8′4″N 11°27′41″E
- Basin countries: Norway
- Surface area: 10.64 km^{2} (4.11 sq mi)
- Shore length^{1}: 30.95 km (19.23 mi)
- Surface elevation: 79 m (259 ft)
- References: NVE
- ^{1} Shore length is not a well-defined measure.

Femsjøen is a lake in the municipality of Halden in Østfold county, Norway. It is the source of the river Tista.

== See also ==
- List of lakes in Norway
