= Magazine paper =

Magazine papers are paper grades generally used in printing of magazines.

== Manufacture ==
Magazine papers are made on paper machines from pulp. The pulp may be recycled, mechanical or chemical depending on the magazine quality. Publishers select the type of paper that not only meets their customers' requirements, but also works well in their machinery.

== Paper grades ==
Different paper grades are used in magazines:

- Machine finished specialties (MFS) is a special newsprint grade that is heavier, bulkier and brighter.
- Supercalendered papers are often used in rotogravure. These are uncoated and based on mechanical pulp.
- Coated mechanical paper are classified depending on the coating weight. Normally higher coating weight gives higher paper quality.
- Machine finished coated papers are high gloss papers based on mechanical pulp.
- Offset paper is an uncoated paper based on chemical pulp suitable for offset printing.
- Standard coated fine papers are often used for offset printing.
- Woodfree Papers made only from cellulose, usually containing less than 10% mechanical content. Coated woodfree or uncoated woodfree. Also Known as a free sheet (USA).
