= Geir Pollen =

Norwegian poet, novelist and translator (born 1953)

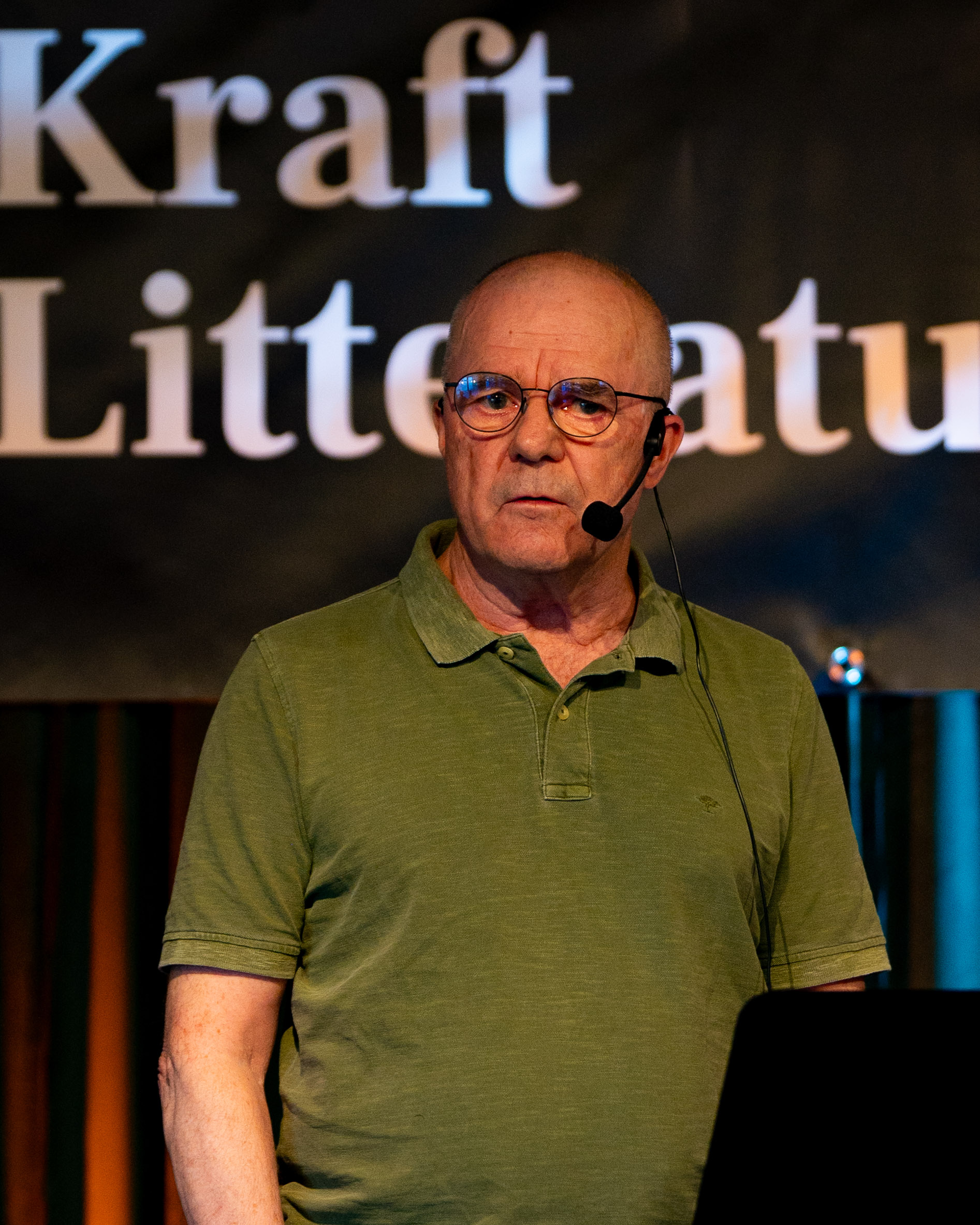
- Geir Pollen (2025)
- Born: 4 April 1953 (age 73); Målselv, Norway
- Occupations: Poet, novelist and translator
- Awards: Critics Prize for the year's best work of translation (2004)

Geir Pollen (born 4 April 1953 in Målselv Municipality) is a Norwegian poet, novelist and translator. His literary debut was the poetry collection Posteringar i språket from 1982. He was leader of the Norwegian Authors' Union from 2001 to 2005.

Cultural offices
Preceded by Karsten Alnæs	Chair of the Norwegian Authors' Union; 2001–2005	Succeeded by Anne Oterholm
