= Catalyst Paper =

Canadian pulp and paper company

Catalyst Paper Corporation
- Company type: Subsidiary
- Industry: Pulp and paper
- Founded: 2000 (as NorskeCanada)
- Headquarters: Richmond, British Columbia, Canada
- Key people: Ned Dwyer (CEO); Les Lederer (Board Chair)
- Number of employees: 2,800
- Parent: Paper Excellence Canada
- Website: Official website

Catalyst Paper Corporation is a pulp and paper company based in Richmond, British Columbia. It operates five pulp mills and paper mills, producing a combined 1.8 million tonnes of paper and 491,000 tonnes of market pulp annually. The mills mostly produce magazine paper and newsprint.

The company was established as NorskeCanada in 2000, when Norske Skog bought the majority of Fletcher Challenge Canada with Elk Falls Mill and Crofton Mill. The following year Pacifica Papers, operating Port Alberni Mill and Powell River Mill, was merged into the group. A recycling plant in Coquitlam was bought in 2003. The group took the Catalyst name in 2005 and the following year Norske Skog sold their shares. Snowflake Mill was bought in 2008. In the following two years the Elk Falls, Coquitlam and one machine at Crofton were shut down. Snowflake followed suit in 2012. The reason was falling demand for newsprint and increased cost of recycled paper. Catalyst reentered US production in 2015 with the purchase of Biron Mill and Rumford Mill.

== History ==
=== Background ===
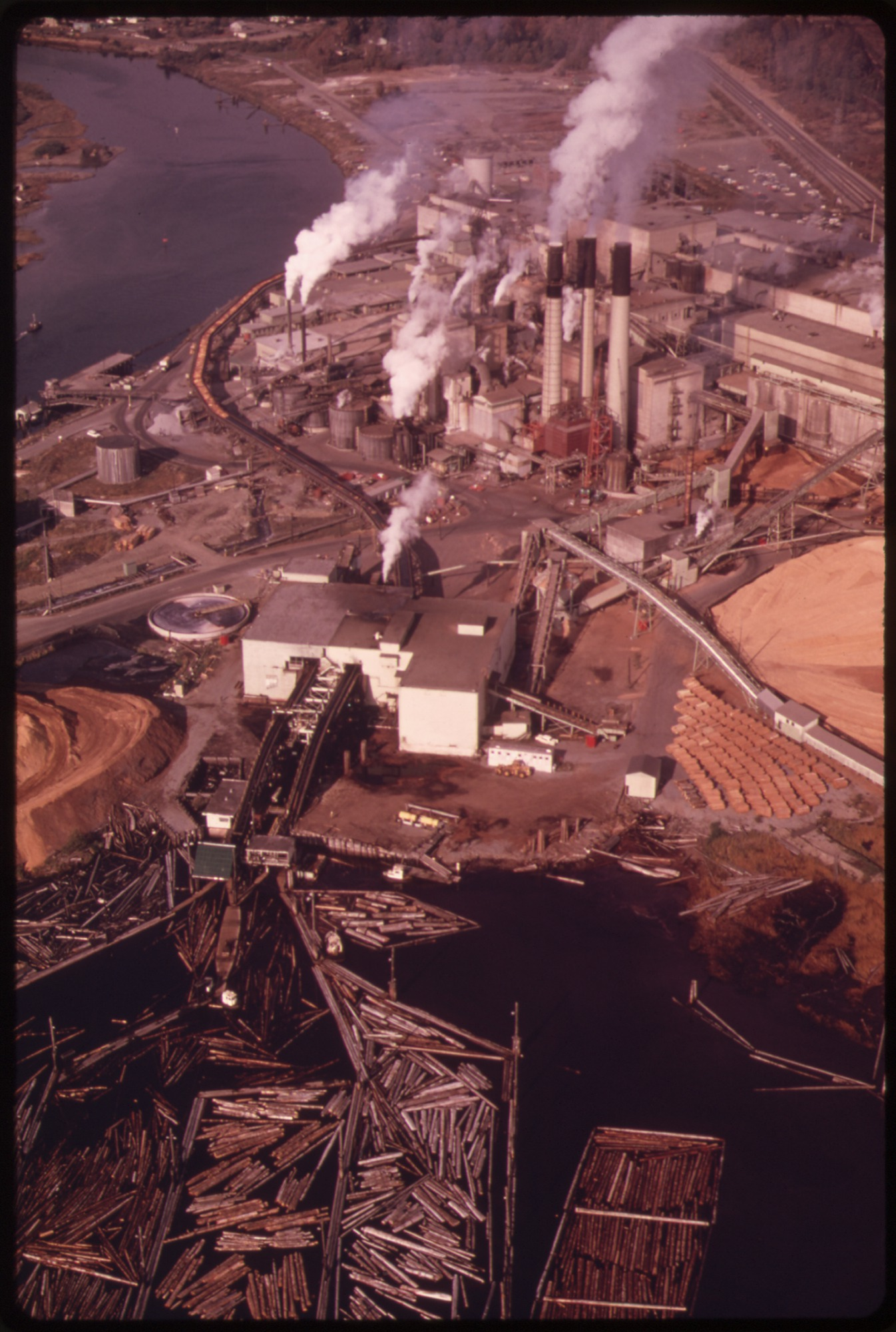
Port Alberni Mill in 1970

Catalyst's Canadian mills date back to 1912, when Powell River Mill was established by The Powell River Paper Company. Bloedel, Stewart and Welch established Port Alberni Mill in 1946, merging to create MacMillan Bloedel in 1951. They merged with The Powell River Paper Company in 1960. The mill assets were spun off to create Pacifica Papers in 1998.

Crown Zellerbach Canada established Elk Falls Mill in 1951. British Columbia Forest Products (BCFP), founded in 1946, established Crofton Mill in 1957. New Zealand's Fletcher Challenge acquired Crown Zellerbach Canada in 1981, changing its name to Crown Forest Industries. Six years later it also bought BCFP, changing the Canadian division's name to Fletcher Challenge Canada.

=== NorskeCanada ===
NorskeCanada had its origins in the 2000 purchase of Fletcher Challenge Pulp and Paper by Norske Skog. The latter was not interested in entering the North American market, but Fletcher Challenge had offered its assets as an all or nothing deal. This included its 50.8 percent share in Fletcher Challenge Canada, which owned Elk Falls Mill and Crofton Mill. The annual meeting in Fletcher Challenge Canada approved with 99.97 percent of the votes on 26 October 2000 to take the name Norske Skog Canada Ltd. At the time the company had NOK 8 billion in cash which it paid in dividends to the owners.

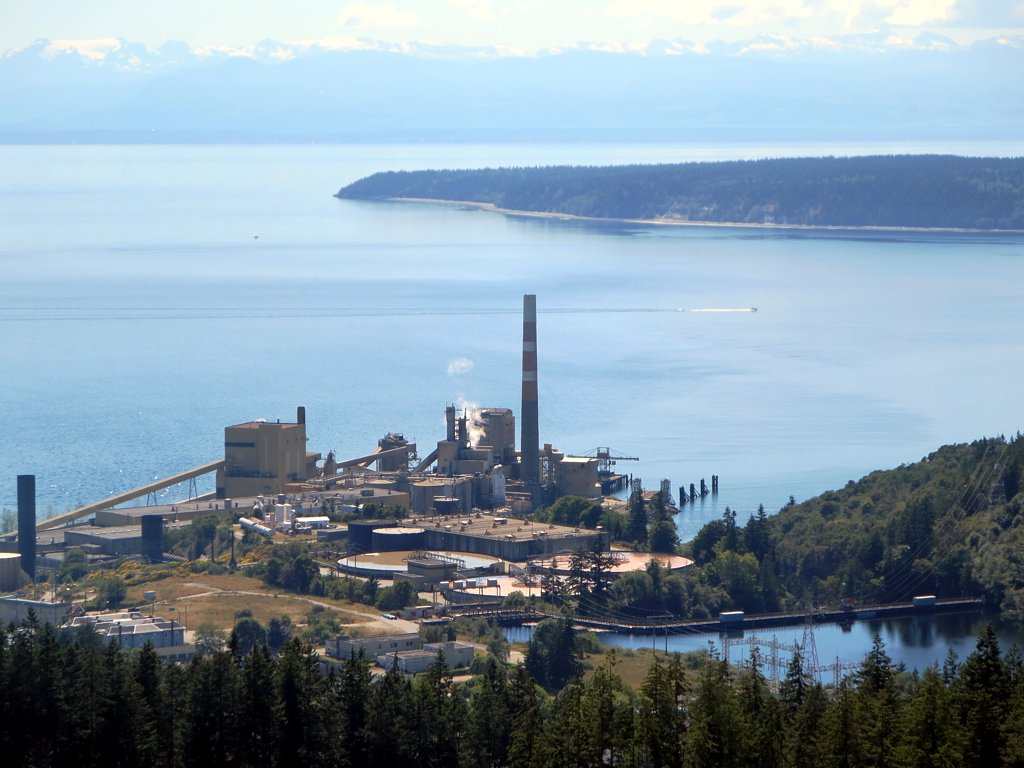
Powell River Mill

Norske Skog considered both selling its shares in NorskeCanada or developing the company further. The latter was chosen, resulting in NorskeCanada purchasing Pacifica Papers on 27 August 2001, giving it control over Port Alberni Mill and Powell River Mill. Two months previously Pacifica Papers had sold Mackenzie Mill. The Pacifica Papers acquisition was funded through the issuing of new shares, diluting Norske Skog's ownership to 36.1%. More new shares were issued in May 2002, reducing Norske Skog's ownership further to 30.6%.

Unlike the rest of the group, Norske Skog lacked the direct control over the assets in Canada. CEO Russ Horner was part of Norske Skog's corporate executive board until the share was diluted. From then the two companies were legally regarded as competitors and the two were not allowed to cooperate closely, for instance through joint sales offices.

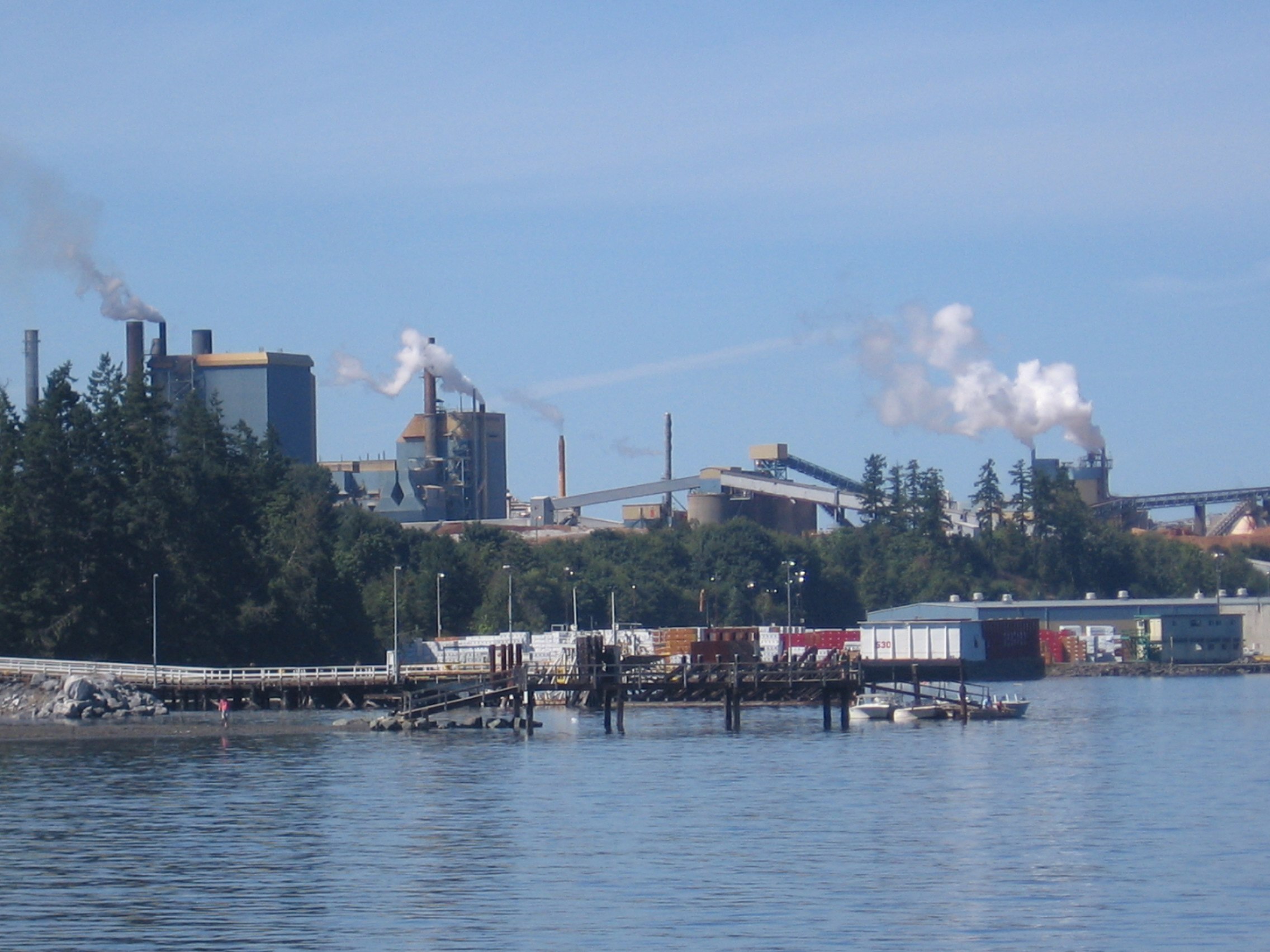
Crofton Mill

The company acquired Newstech Recycling of Coquitlam in December 2003. Western Canada's first and largest paper recycling plant was bought to vertically integrate a source of deinked paper. The acquisition was partially paid in cash, partially in shares. The site handled 163,000 tonnes of old newsprint from British Columbia and Alberta, as well as more remote sources, predominantly Minnesota and Kansas City, shipped by train to Coquitlam. Once deinked, the pulp was sent by barge to Crofton Mill.

By 2005 NorskeCanada had operated with a deficit in 13 of 19 quarters, and Norske Skog started considering its options for the company. Pöyry was hired to consider the operations, and concluded that the mills were not competitive for export to Asia, a prime target market for Norske Skog. The paper particularly emphasized inefficient mill designs which led to higher operating costs. The first step was taken in October 2005, when the general meeting approved the new name, Catalyst Paper, to signal that the group was leaving Norske Skog. The Norwegian group sold its 29.4 percent of Catalyst for $186 million in a bought deal on 30 January 2006. At the time Catalyst's four mills made it North America's fourth-largest producer of printing papers, with an annual production of two million tonnes of paper and half a million tonnes of kraft pulp.

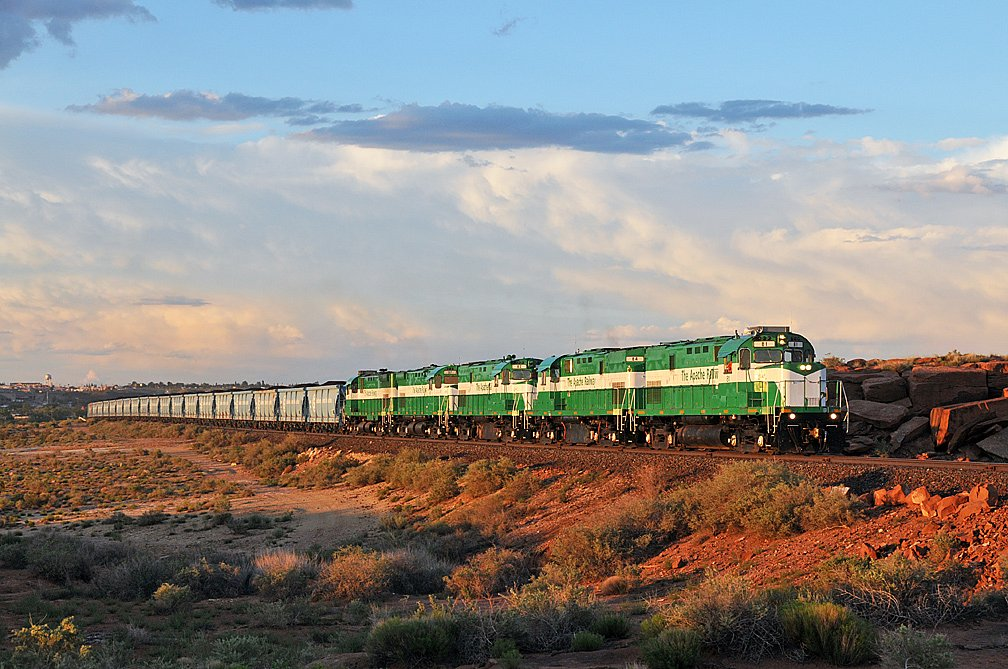
Train on the Apache Railway used to transport old newsprint and coal to and newsprint from the Snowflake Mill

=== Internationalization ===
Catalyst's first US investment was Snowflake Mill, which was acquired in 2008. Catalyst took steps to upgrade the mill, including investments to allow the plant to produce finer grades of paper. Snowflake was an early user of deinking pulp and was amongst the first in the US to accept single-source recycling materials. This moves some of the recycling work from the recyclers, thus cutting their costs, in exchange for a stronger market position and lower raw prices. However, Snowflake Mill was stuck with a raw product flow which contain contaminants, such as plastic and metals.

Elk Fall Mills was shut down on 30 November 2008. In addition to falling demand for newsprint, the mill increasingly failed to secure sufficient virgin fiber, as the mill used sawdust rather than woodchips as its source material. The 2008 recession caused a decline in demand for building materials, causing at least three of the main sawdust suppliers to Elk Fall Mill to shut down. This was worsened by increasing power prices and a strengthening of the Canadian dollar.

After 2005 China started buying large quantities of old newsprint from North America, particularly from the West Coast. In addition to causing a shortage in recycled paper, the exports caused a steep increase in the prices. Combined with reduced demand for newsprint, Catalyst decided to curtail production at Paper Machine 1 from 23 December 2009. The following year the corporation decided to close the Coquitlam plant and permanently terminate production at Paper Machine 1 in Crofton.

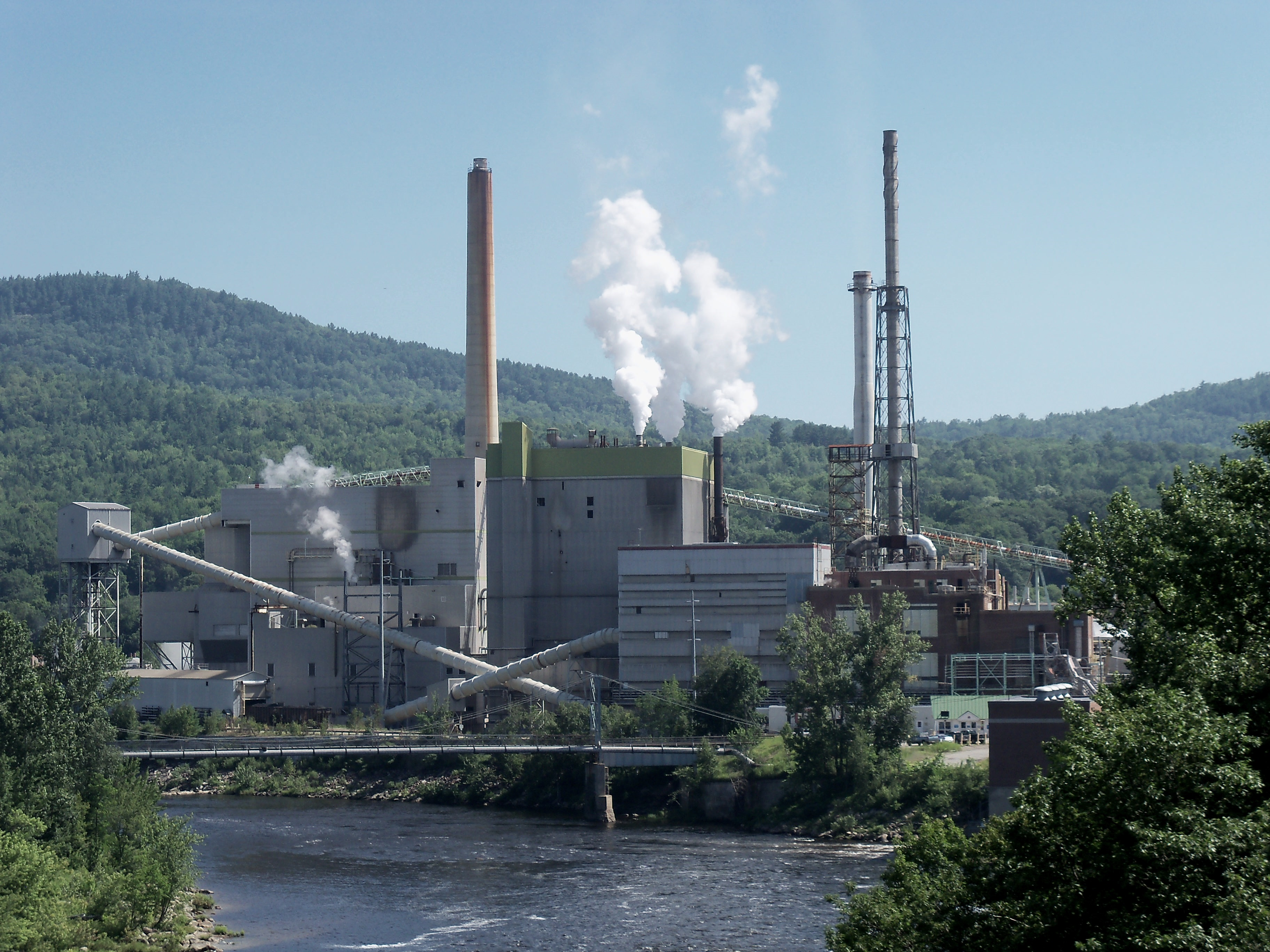
Rumford Mill is situated on the Androscoggin River

From 2008 Snowflake encountered a steadily more competitive environment. Prices of recycled fibers rose with increased demand from Chinese importers. Slack at quality controlling received papers at Chinese mills allowed for the export of steadily more contaminated wastes, which again affected the quality and prices for Snowflake. This led to higher prices and lower quality for Snowflake Mill. The price of old newsprint increased by 163% from 2009 to 2012.. The mill was therefore permanently closed on 30 September 2012, after having provided a negative EBIDTA every year since 2009.

As part of the Verso Corporation 2015 acquisition of NewPage, US authorities required two mills to be sold. Catalyst therefore bought Biron Mill in Biron, Wisconsin, and Rumford Mill in Rumford, Maine. Both produce coated paper, allowing Catalyst to expand its paper portfolio into finer grades. The mills were bought for US$62 million. The deal led to a 65% increase in Catalyst's production.

In 2017, Catalyst's three major shareholders bought out the remaining shareholders, leading to the delisting of the company from the Toronto Stock Exchange.

On June 29, 2018, Catalyst sold Rumford Mill in Rumford, Maine and Biron Mill in Biron, WI along with the company's US operations center in Dayton, Ohio to Nine Dragons Paper (Holdings) Limited (ND Paper).

On October 9, 2018, Catalyst announced that Paper Excellence entered into an agreement to purchase all shares of Catalyst Paper.

== Operations ==
Catalyst Paper Corporation is headquartered in Richmond, British Columbia. It has an annual production of 1.8 million tonnes of paper and 491,000 tonnes of market pulp. It has an annualized sales of $2.0 billion per year.

== Mills ==
List of pulp and paper mills
Mill	Location	PMs	Production	Period	Ref
Biron	Biron, Wisconsin, United States	2	Coated groundwood paper (335,000 t)	2015–18	
Coquitlam	Coquitlam, British Columbia, Canada	0	Deinking (163,000 t)	2003–10	
Crofton	Crofton, British Columbia, Canada	2	Newsprint (350,000 t); NBSK (377,000 t)	2000–	
Elk Falls	Campbell River, British Columbia, Canada	2	Newsprint (373,000 t); Uncoated fine paper (153,000 t)	2000–08	
Port Alberni	Port Alberni, British Columbia, Canada	2	Coated paper (224,000 t); Directory paper (116,000 t)	2001–	
Powell River	Powell River, British Columbia, Canada	2	Uncoated fine paper (350,000 t)	2001– 20	
Rumford	Rumford, Maine, United States	3	Coated groundwood paper (438,000 t)	2015–18	
Snowflake	Snowflake, Arizona, United States	2	Newsprint (289,000 t); Uncoated fine paper (48,000 t)	2008–12	

== Bibliography ==
- Pollen, Geir (2007). Langt fra stammen (in Norwegian). Oslo: Gyldendal Norsk Forlag. ISBN 978-82-05-34625-3.
