= Snowflake Mill =

Former pulp and paper mill in Arizona

- Built: 1961
- Location: Snowflake, Arizona, United States
- Coordinates: 34.503°N 110.336°W
- Industry: Pulp and paper
- Products: Paper: Newsprint; Uncoated fine paper
- Employees: 293 (2014)
- Area: 77 km^{2} (30 sq mi)
- Owner: Catalyst Paper
- Defunct: 30 September 2012

Snowflake Mill was a pulp mill and paper mill located in the US town of Snowflake, Arizona. The mill had two paper machines which produced 339,000 tonnes of newsprint and uncoated fine paper. It sourced its fiber from two deinking pulp lines. The mill had 293 employees as of 2014. Transport to and from the mill was carried out on the Apache Railway.

Founded in 1961, the mill was eventually owned by the Stone Container Corporation. Ownership passed to Abitibi-Consolidated in 1998 and then to Catalyst Paper in 2008. Due to increased recycled paper prices and a decline in the demand for newsprint, the mill was closed on 30 September 2012.

== History ==
The mill opened in 1961 as a four-machine, multi-product plant. The mill was bought by Stone Container Corporation who also secured ownership of the Apache Railway. Wastewater from the mill entered Dry Lake until 1996, as well as into Twin Lakes from 1985. A wastewater treatment plant was installed in 1992. During this period the mill received its pulp from the kraft process, a re-causticizing process and a chlorine-based bleaching process. Stone sold the mill and railway to Abitibi-Consolidated in 1998.

Snowflake was an early user of deinking pulp and was amongst the first in the US to accept single-source recycling materials. This moves some of the recycling work from the recyclers, thus cutting their costs, in exchange for a stronger market position and lower raw prices. However, Snowflake Mill was stuck with a raw product flow which contained contaminants, such as plastic and metals.

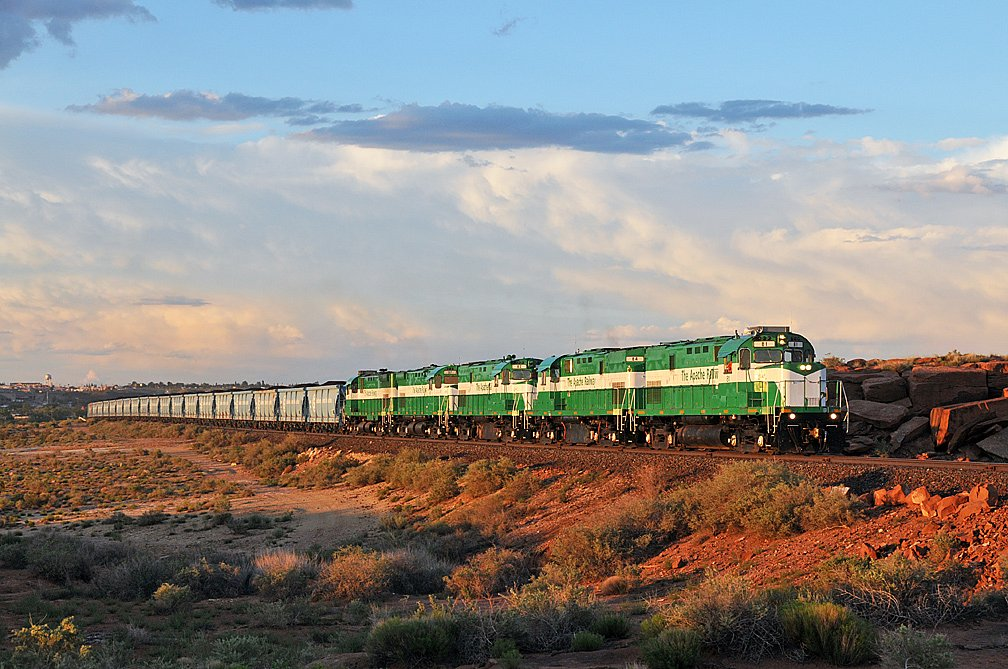
Train on the Apache Railway used to transport to and from the mill

Catalyst Paper bought the mill in 2008. Catalyst took steps to upgrade the mill, including investments that allowed the plant to produce finer grades of paper.

From 2008 the mill fell into a steadily more competitive environment. Prices of recycled fibers rose with increased demand from Chinese importers. Slack at quality controlling received papers at Chinese mills allowed for the export of a steadily more contaminated wastes, which again affected the quality and prices for Snowflake. This led to higher prices and lower quality for Snowflake Mill. The price of old newsprint increased by 163 percent from 2009 to 2012.

Meanwhile, the newsprint demand fell sharply following the Great Recession and the advent of increased online newspaper reading, with demand for newsprint declining with about ten percent per annum from 2009 through 2012.The mill was therefore permanently closed on 30 September 2012, after having provided a negative EBIDTA every year since 2009.

Snowflake Mill was the sole large-scale recipient of waste paper in the Rocky Mountains Region. The closure had impacts on recycling companies throughout the region, who saw both reduced demand for waste paper—and hence low prices—as well as higher transport costs. Instead, paper must be transported to the Pacific Northwest, Idaho, or exported to Mexico or China via California. By 2012, there were demands for higher intake quality at all mills, with the least contaminated paper waste being preferred by all recipients.

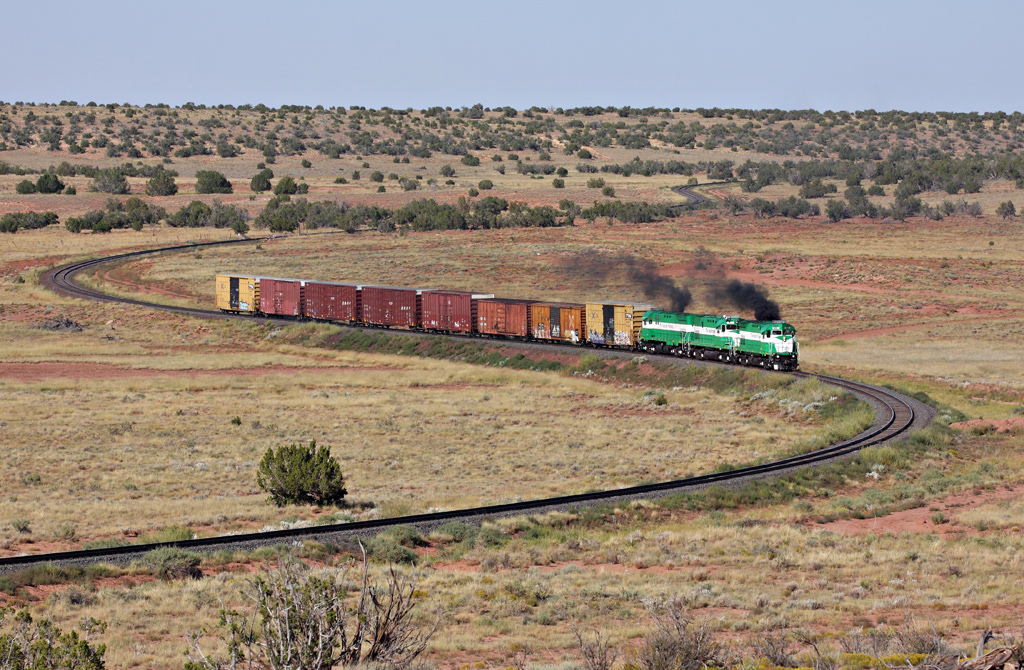
Apache Railway train running ten days before the mill closed

The assets comprising Snowflake Mill, including the Apache Railway, were sold to Hackman Capital for $13.46 million at an auction held on 17 December 2012. The two power plants were bought by Bob Worsley's Nova Power, costing $12 million.

== Operations ==
Snowflake Mill is situated on a 19,000 acres (7,700 ha) site situated west of Snowflake, Arizona. The mill had two paper machines and two deinking lines. The latter receive about 350,000 tonnes of recycled paper annually. Two paper machines produced 289 tonnes of newsprint and 48,000 tonnes of uncoated fine paper annually based entirely on deinked fibers. The products were sold mostly within the Southwestern United States. Part of the mill site included two power stations. One was 24-megawatt thermal power station run on biomass, the other rated at 80 megawatts burning coal.

The mill's main means of transport was the Apache Railway, a short-line railroad with the same owner as the mill. The trains were used to haul both old newsprint and coal to the mill, and manufactured paper from the mill. The railway runs to the BNSF at Holbrook, intersecting with the former Atchison, Topeka and Santa Fe Railway.
