= Powell River Mill =

Pulp and paper mill in British Columbia, Canada

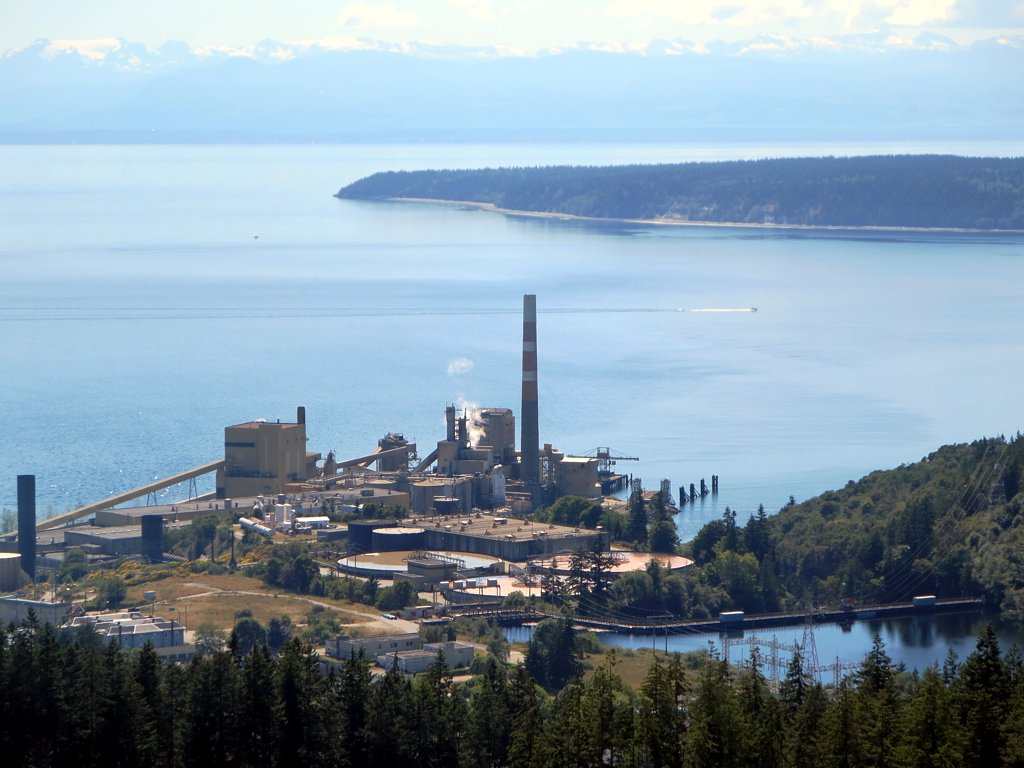

- Location within British Columbia
- Built: 1912
- Location: Powell River, British Columbia, Canada
- Coordinates: 49.8718°N 124.5580°W
- Industry: Pulp and paper
- Products: Paper: Newsprint; Uncoated fine paper
- Employees: 441 (2014)
- Owner: Catalyst Paper
- Defunct: 2021

Powell River Mill was a pulp mill and paper mill located in the Canadian town of Powell River, British Columbia. Part of Catalyst Paper, the mill has three paper machines which produce 469,000 tonnes of newsprint and uncoated fine paper. The mill had 441 employees as of 2014.

The mill was established by The Powell River Company in 1912 as the first manufacturer of newsprint in Western Canada. By 1913 it had two paper machines, and four by 1917. The Powell River Company was merged into MacMillan Bloedel in 1960. Ownership passed to Pacifica Papers in 1998, which was in turn bought by Norske Skog Canada in 2001, becoming Catalyst Paper in 2005. The mill was indefinitely closed in December 2021, with the closure being made permanent in August 2023.
