= Crofton Mill =

Paper mill in British Columbia, Canada

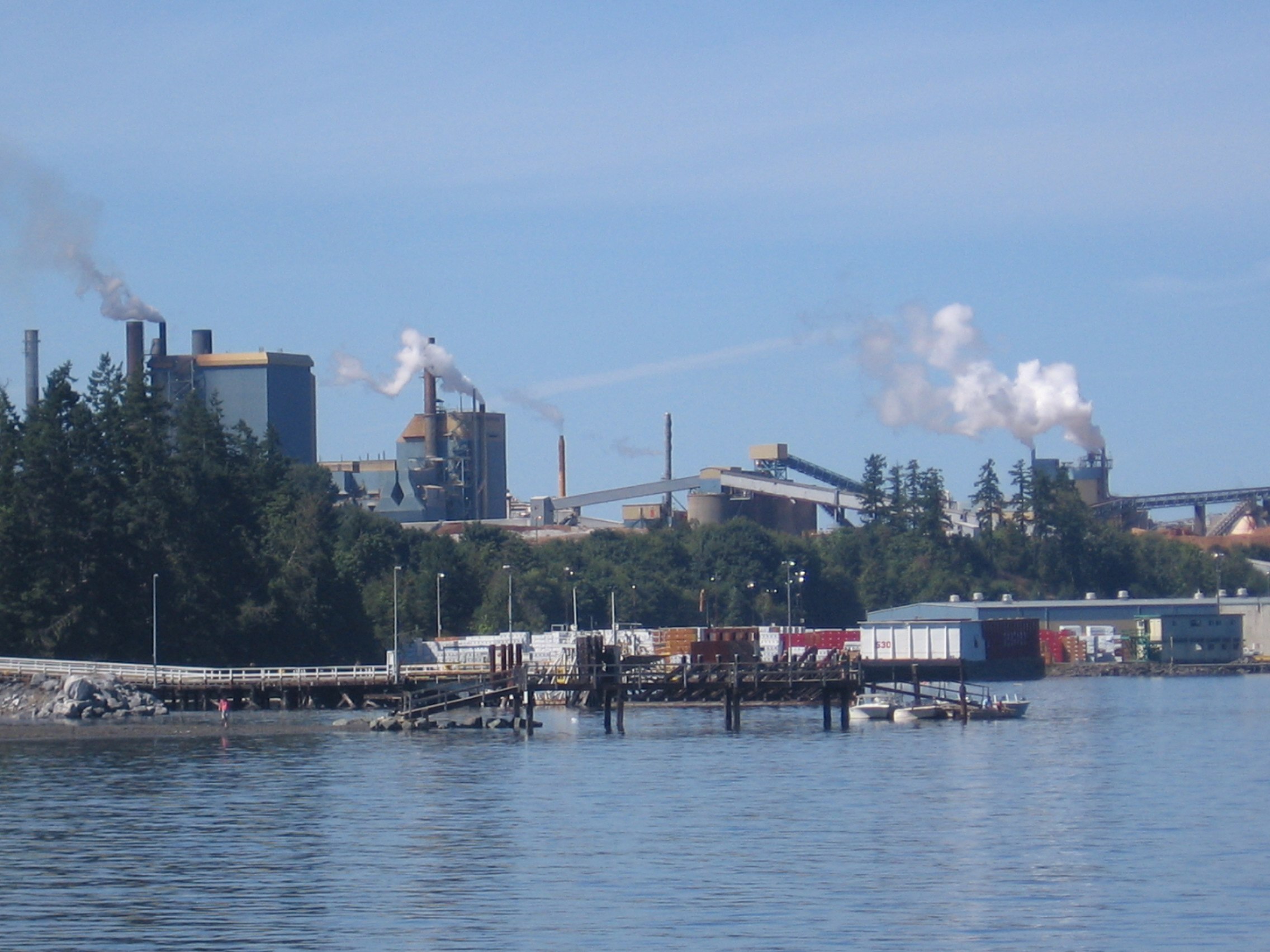

- Location within British Columbia
- Built: 1956
- Location: Crofton, British Columbia, Canada
- Coordinates: 48.8742°N 123.6514°W
- Industry: Pulp and paper
- Products: Paper: Newsprint; Directory paper; Northern bleached softwood kraft
- Employees: 578 (2014)
- Owner: Catalyst Paper

Crofton Mill is a pulp mill and paper mill located in the Vancouver Island town of Crofton, British Columbia. The mill has 3 paper machines (only 2 are operational) and 2 pulp machines, which produce 349,000 tonnes of newsprint and directory paper, and 355,000 tonnes of northern bleached softwood kraft.

Two operational recovery boilers (#3&4) are supported by one full time hog boiler (#4 power boiler) and one standby natural gas and oil fueled boiler (#5 power boiler). The plant also has a state of the art waste treatment facility and oxygen plant, the oxygen plant supplies oxygen for the waste treatment facility and bleach plants as well as medical and non medical oxygen to praxair. The mill has 578 employees as of 2014.

British Columbia Forest Products (BCFP) established the mill in 1957, originally operating only a single-line kraft pulp mill. A newsprint line was installed in 1964. Fletcher Challenge bought BCFP (including the mill) in 1987 through its Canadian operations division Crown Forest Industries, and merged to form Fletcher Challenge Canada. Norske Skog bought the latter in 2000, to operate within its Canadian division, which became Catalyst Paper in 2005. Paper Excellence Canada completed its acquisition of Catalyst Paper in 2019.

In early 2024, Paper Excellence shut down paper production at the Crofton mill, pulp production continues.

On December 2nd, 2025, Domtar announced the permanent closure of the Crofton Mill.
