= BCFP =

BCFP may refer to:

- British Columbia Forest Products, currently Catalyst Paper
- Bureau of Consumer Financial Protection (commonly the Consumer Financial Protection Bureau), an agency of the United States government
