= Elk Falls Mill =

Canadian Mill

- Location within British Columbia
- Built: 1952
- Location: Campbell River, British Columbia, Canada
- Coordinates: 50.0711°N 125.2825°W
- Industry: Pulp and paper
- Products: Newsprint
- Defunct: 2010

Elk Falls Mill was a pulp mill and paper mill located in the Canadian town of Campbell River, British Columbia, operating between 1952 and 2010. At the end of its life, the mill had three paper machines, with a combined annual production of 373,000 tonnes of newsprint and 153,000 tonnes specialized papers.

The mill was established by Crown Zellerbach in 1952 as the first newsprint mill on Vancouver Island. This was made possible through the construction of hydroelectric generating stations on the Campbell River. Crown Zellerbach was bought by Fletcher Challenge in 1981, becoming Crown Forest Industries. It merged in 1987 to form Fletcher Challenge Canada. This was again bought by Norske Skog in 2000 and became part of their Canadian division, which became Catalyst Paper in 2005. Elk Falls Mill was closed in 2010 due to diminishing demand for newsprint. It is the site of Island Generating Station, a natural gas-fired fossil-fuel power station.
