= Mechanical pulping =

Mechanical pulping is the process in which wood is separated or defibrated mechanically into pulp for the paper industry. Mechanical pulping processes use wood in the form of logs or chips that are mechanically processes, by grinding stones (from logs) or in refiners (from chips), to separate the fibers.

Industrial mechanical pulping started in the 1840s with groundwood pulping, producing the pulp from grinding. This made wood fibers the main raw material in paper, instead of textile fibers. Later the chemical pulping processes started dominating for many paper types. Today the groundwood pulping mills are few, but the mechanical pulping processes employing refiners are still important in the Pulp and paper industry. The mechanical pulps are primarily used in newspaper and magazine paper and the chemimechanical pulps for cardboard and soft paper.

== Mechanical pulps in the paper industry ==
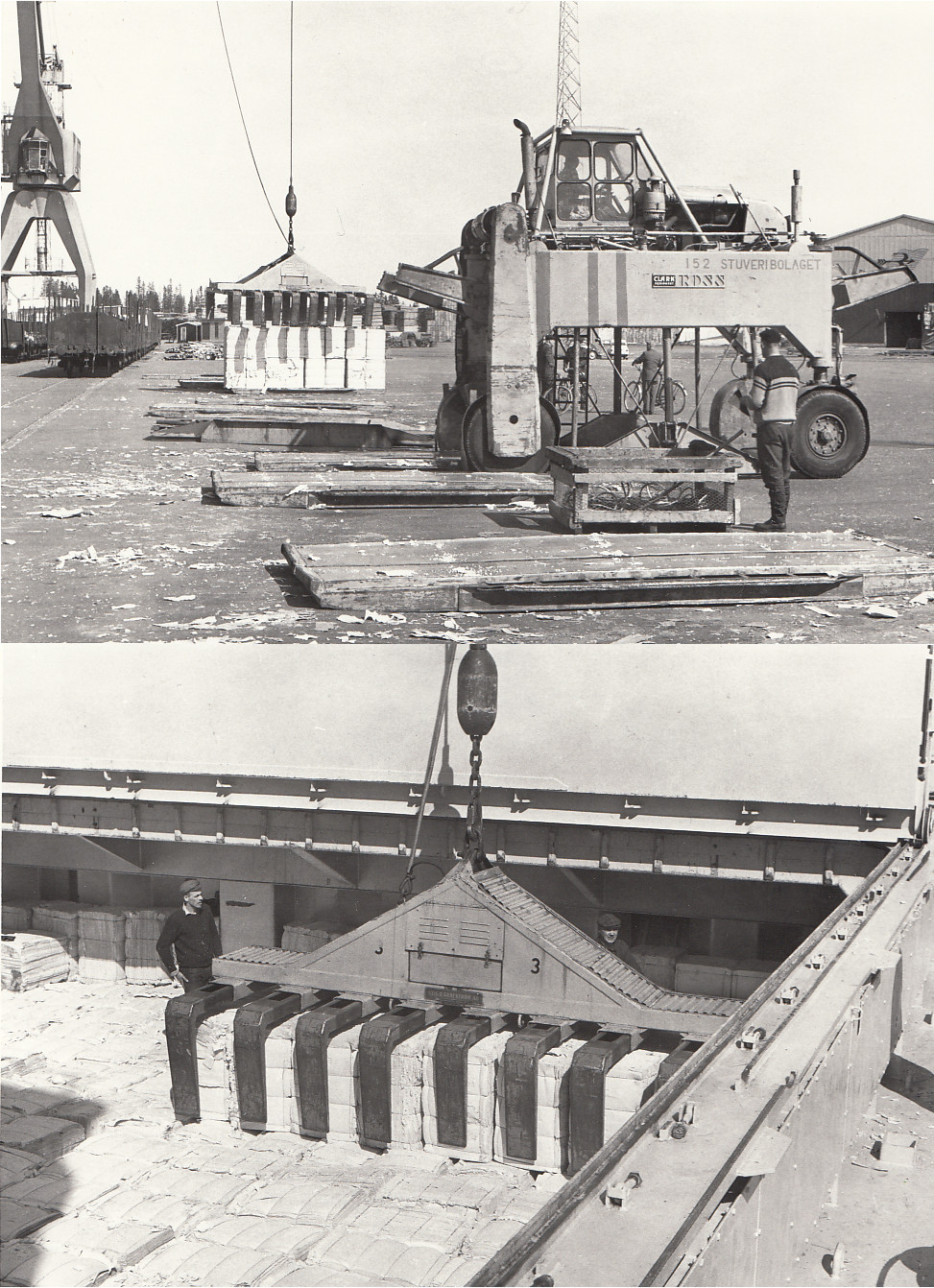
Wet pulp is loaded in the port in Umeå, Sweden in 1967.

Mechanical pulp is very different from the pulp produced in the chemical processes (the sulfite process and the Kraft process). The chemical methods gives paper with higher strength and pulp that can be bleached further than the mechanical pulps. A benefit from the mechanical processes is that they have a high yield, usually between 90 and 98%, which means that nearly all the wood is used. The yield of the Kraft process is only about 50%, which makes the demand of wood twice as high for the same amount of produced pulp

Another benefit of the mechanical pulps is the excellent printing properties, making them very useful in newsprint and magazines. They absorb ink well, have high opacities and low area density. Chemimechanical pulps, made from wood that has been treated with sodium sulfite or sodium hydroxide, can give paper with high stiffness, making them suitable for paper board and as a stiff layer in paper packaging.

Mechanical pulping processes have a high yield, which at the same time means that some lignin remains in the paper. Lignin is modified by sunlight, making paper produced from mechanical pulps susceptible to yellowing and becoming brittle. Mechanical pulps can be bleached with hydrogen peroxide or sodium dithionite, but the brightness is only increased slightly and the yellowing cannot be prevented.

Mechanical pulping is primarily used in paper products with relatively short life span, such as newspaper, books or brochures, but also in coated paper grades for magazines and catalogs. It is also used as the middle layer in cardboard because of its stiffness. These products are used to a high degree, which makes mechanical pulps common in recycled paper and as recycled fibers for paper production. The recycled fibers are mostly used in simpler cardboard, newspaper and tissue paper.

A drawback with the mechanical pulping processes are that they are energy-intensive. A typical refiner pulp can require 2000 kWh/mass ton pulp. A larger mechanical pulp and paper mill can, including the paper production, consume 200-300 MW electricity. The chemical pulping processes can often generate enough energy (steam and electricity) to make the mill energy self-sufficient. This energy is generated from wood leftovers (bark and chips) and from black liquor, which in principle is 50% of the incoming wood (as the yield is less than 50% and a majority of the rest ends up in the black liquor). In the mechanical pulp mills the majority of the electricity is converted to heat, creating steam which is utilized in the paper machines.

== Mechanical pulping processes ==
A number of different mechanical processes exist:

- Stone groundwood pulp (SGW) is produced by pressing the wood onto a rotating grinding stone. The grinding grits in the surface will penetrate into the surface of the wood and separate the fibers by a combination of compression, heating and shear.
- Pressurised groundwood pulp (PGW) is produced in the same manner as SGW, but the grinding is performed in a pressurized chamber with steam. This makes the process more efficient and reduce the energy consumption.
- Refiner mechanical pulp (RMP) is produced by feeding wood chip into the center of a disk refiner, consisting of two grooved discs. Either one disc rotates and the other is stationary, or both are rotating in opposite directions. The wood chips are forced toward the periphery by the centrifugal force and is crushed into pulp between the discs.
- Thermomechanical pulp (TMP) is produced in the same manner as RMP, but in an atmosphere with elevated pressure. TMP pulp can be produced in several steps, of which the first refiner is pressurized.
- Chemimechanical pulp (CMP) is produced with refiners, but the chips are impregnated of soaked in chemicals before refining. This softens the wood by dissolving some of the lignin. The yield also drops below 90% as a consequence.
- Chemi-thermomechanical pulp (CTMP) is similar to CMP, but the refining is made under elevated pressures and less chemicals are used.
- Bleached chemi-thermomechanical pulp (BCTMP) also includes a bleaching step.

== See also ==
- Pulp
- Sulfite process and Kraft process
- Bleaching of wood pulp
