= Port Alberni Mill =

Paper mill in British Columbia, Canada

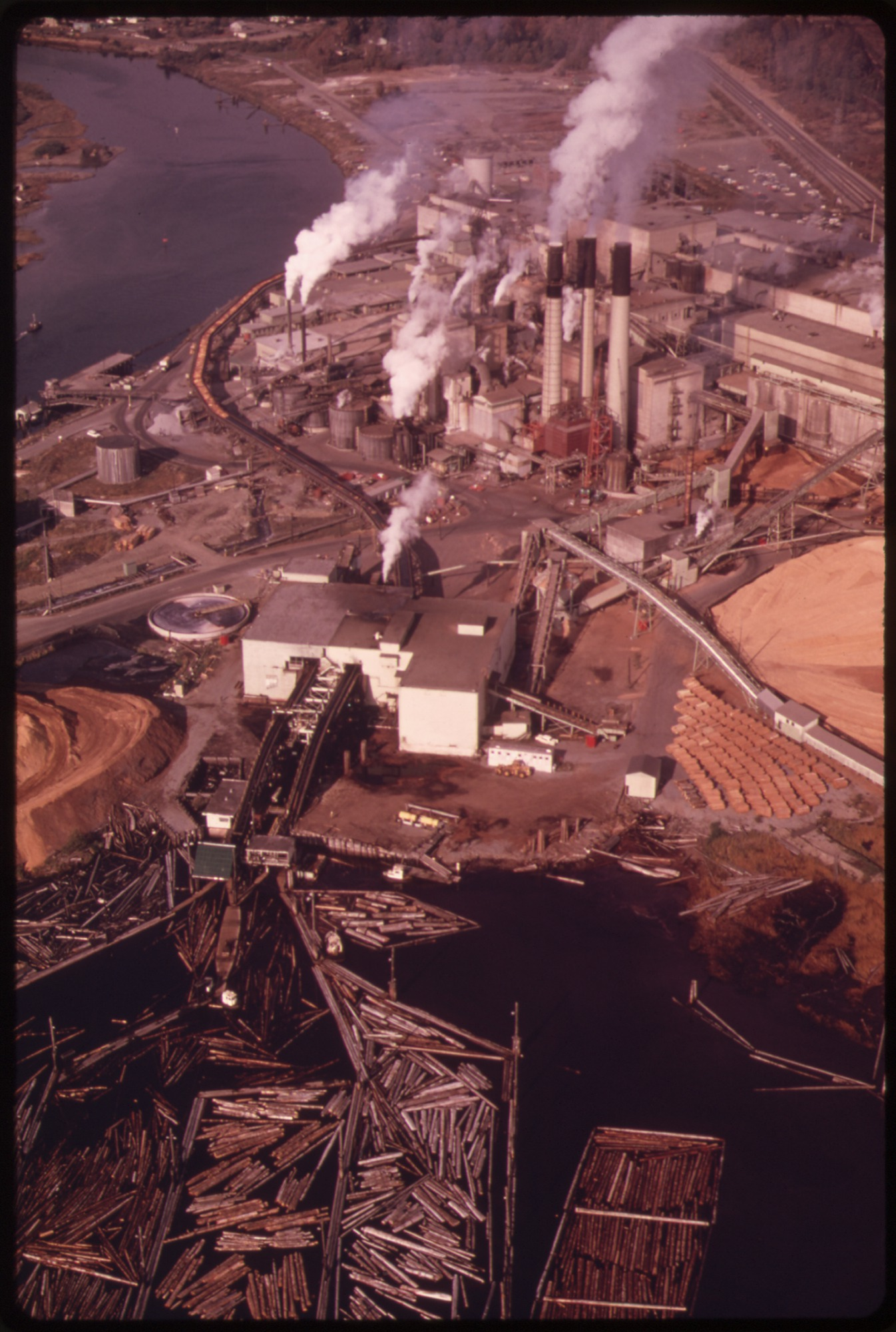
- The mill in 1970

- Location within British Columbia
- Built: 1946
- Location: Port Alberni, British Columbia, Canada
- Coordinates: 49.2481°N 124.8112°W
- Industry: Pulp and paper
- Products: Paper: Directory paper; Lightweight coated paper
- Employees: 310 (2020)
- Owner: Paper Excellence

Port Alberni Mill is a paper mill located in the Canadian town of Port Alberni, British Columbia, on the edge of the Alberni Inlet. Part of Paper Excellence, the mill has two paper machines which produce 336,000 tonnes. Port Alberni Mill produces directory, lightweight coated paper, and specialty papers. The mill's papers are used in telephone directories, catalogues, magazines, brochures, inserts, flyers, and in food grade applications. The mill has 310 employees as of 2020.

The mill was established by Bloedel, Stewart and Welch in 1946, originally operating only a kraft pulp mill. This came by after an injunction by Fisheries and Oceans Canada, who prohibited the use of the sulfite process. In addition to being the first significant new BC mill in decades, it was the first BC mill to integrate residuals from sawmills. By way of merger, ownership passed to MacMillan Bloedel in 1951. The two paper machines were installed in 1957, at first producing newsprint. Ownership passed to Pacifica Papers in 1998, Norske Skog Canada in 2000, and Catalyst Paper in 2005.
