= Apache Railway =

Transport company in Arizona

Overview
- Headquarters: Snowflake, Arizona
- Reporting mark: APA
- Locale: Holbrook–Snowflake, Arizona
- Dates of operation: 1917–

Technical
- Track gauge: 4 ft 8 1/2 in (1,435 mm) standard gauge

Other
- Website: apacherailway.com

The Apache Railway (reporting mark APA) is an Arizona short-line railroad that operates from a connection with the BNSF at Holbrook to the Snowflake Mill near Snowflake, Arizona, 38 miles (61 km). The APA was acquired by Catalyst Paper from Abitibi Consolidated in 2008. The Snowflake paper mill shut down permanently on September 30, 2012. In late 2015, the railway was purchased out of bankruptcy by a group including Aztec Land & Cattle Company and Midwest Poultry Producers, thereby avoiding a shutdown and scrappage of the line. The railway continues to operate, and its revenues are driven primarily by car repair and storage. The railway's freight revenues have not yet recovered from the shutdown of the Snowflake paper mill then owned by Catalyst, although efforts to enhance them continue.

== History ==
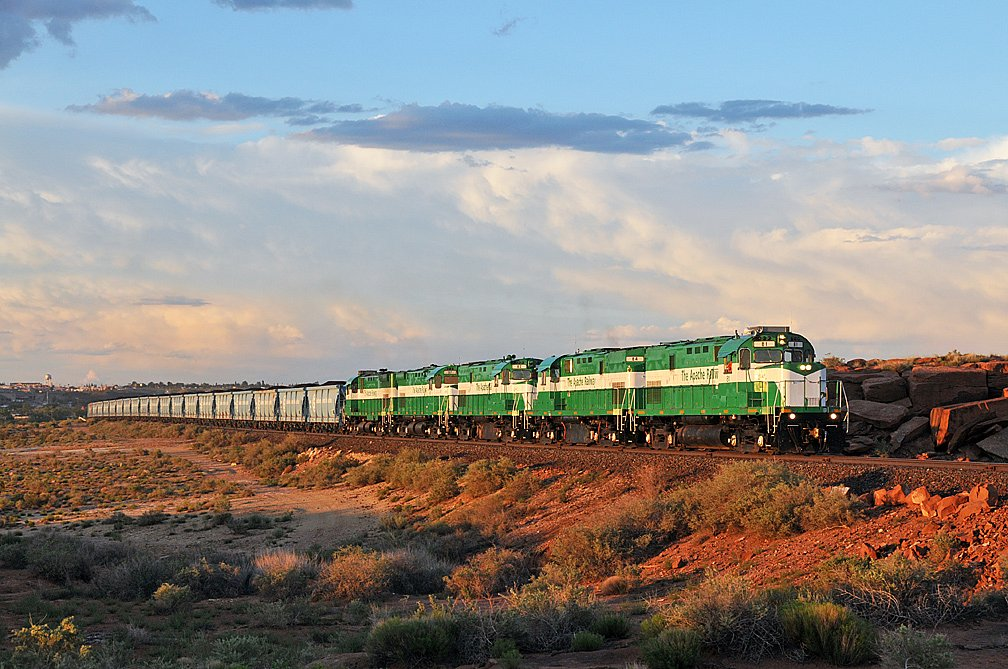
Apache Railway train, just south of Holbrook, Arizona in 2010

The Apache Railway was incorporated in 1917, when it began construction of a rail line from Holbrook south, reaching Snowflake in 1918. It was extended south to McNary in 1920. The tracks eventually extended further south to Maverick in 1944.

From October 1, 1931, until 1936, amid the Great Depression, the APA was placed in receivership.

A tourist railroad, the White Mountain Scenic Railroad, operated steam powered passenger excursions over the Southwest Forest Industries-owned line from McNary to the logging camp at Maverick, beginning in 1964. As track conditions deteriorated, the excursions were cut back in later years to a point about halfway to Maverick. In the final years, it operated north from Pinetop Lakes to a place called Bell Siding on U.S. Route 60. In 1976, the White Mountain Scenic Railroad ceased operations and moved its equipment to Heber City, Utah to be used on an excursion there known as the "Heber Creeper." The line from Maverick to McNary, with some elevations exceeding 9,000 ft (2,700 m), was removed in 1982 after the McNary sawmill closed. A section of the line was later converted to a rail trail, the Railroad Grade Trail. Another section is part of the Indian Springs Trail.

By the 1980s, the Apache Railway was Arizona's only remaining logging railroad. The track from Snowflake to McNary was abandoned in 1982.

In July 2012, the owner of the railroad and an on-line paper mill, Catalyst Paper, announced that the mill and railroad would shut down and be sold later in the year. In December, Catalyst agreed to sell the railroad and mill to Hackman Capital. Hackman planned to dismantle the railroad along with the mill, but local officials who wanted to retain rail service formed a non-profit foundation to purchase the railroad from lenders, using a federal Railroad Rehabilitation & Improvement Financing loan, which was denied in November 2014. Hackman took over control again and put the railroad into bankruptcy in May 2015, while local officials attempted to secure a rural economic development loan from the United States Department of Agriculture. A bankruptcy court ruled on September 1, 2015, to postpone the sale deadline of the railroad, which the court valued at $7.2 million, until November 30.

After several dispositive hearings before the bankruptcy court, the Aztec Land & Cattle Company agreed to pay Hackman the amount due. In 2015, the Apache Railway's stock was passed to a holding company that is owned and controlled by both Aztec and Midwest Poultry.

== Operations ==
1996 figures: 16,000 cars per year

- recycled fiber
- pulpwood
- wood chips
- coal
- paper
- chemicals
- grain

2018 figures: Apache Railway has evolved into car repairs, wet and dry cleaning, and railcar storage. In April 2018, the railroad opened itself to repairing tank cars followed by an immediate onslaught of business. Approximately 10% of total revenue comes from actual freight haulage while the remaining 90% consists of railcar repair, cleaning, and storage.

=== Passenger service ===
The Apache Railway offered passenger service until the 1950s. In July 1954, the mixed train operated on Mondays, Wednesdays and Fridays, departing McNary at 7:15 am, arriving Holbrook at 12:15 pm, departing there at 1:30 pm and returning to McNary at 7:00 pm.

== Motive power ==
The Apache Railway uses ALCO Century C420 and MLW C424s.

Current Roster:

- APA 81 - C420 (ex Louisville & Nashville 1305)
- APA 82 - C420 (ex Tennessee Central 400)
- APA 83 - C420 (ex Monon 516)
- APA 84 - C420 (ex Norfolk & Western 415)
- APA 97 - C424 (ex Canadian Pacific) acquired in 1998
- APA 98 - C424 (ex Canadian Pacific 4227) acquired in 1998
- APA 99 - C424 (ex Canadian Pacific 4233) acquired in 1998

== Route ==
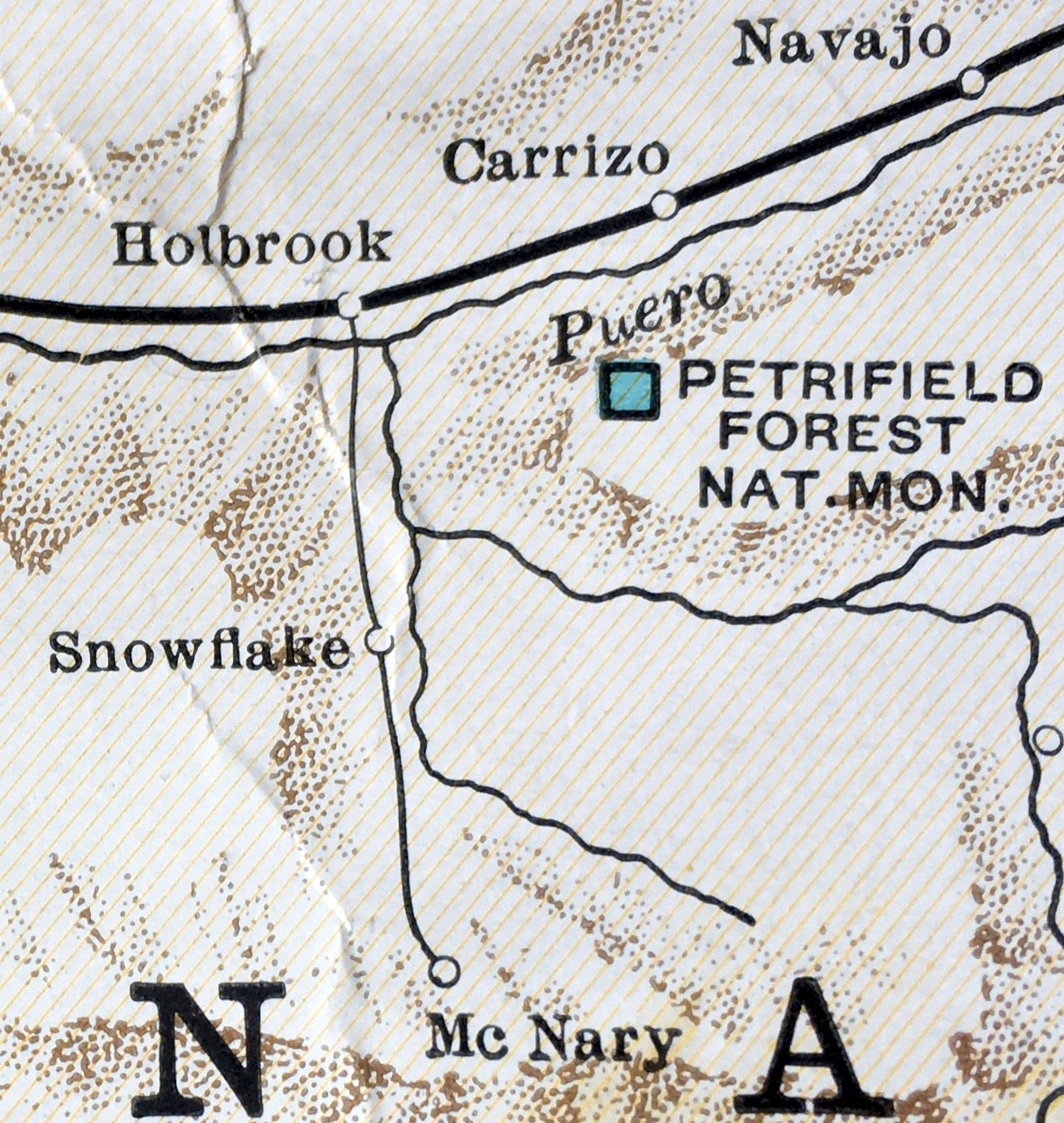
Route in 1930

- Holbrook (interchange with BNSF Railway's Gallup Subdivision/formerly Atchison, Topeka & Santa Fe)
- Blair
- Snowflake Pig Farm
- Tours
- Snowflake Junction
- Apache Railway Shops
- Snowflake Paper Mill (Catalyst Paper)
- Snowflake Junction
- Snowflake

=== Abandoned routes ===
Abandoned in 1980.

- Snowflake (interchange with the now defunct Standard Lumber)
- Taylor
- Silver Lake
- Bell Siding
- Sponseller (with several lumber spurs into the forest to the east)
- Pinetop Lakes (with several lumber spurs into the forest)
- McNary (interchange with Southwest Forest Industries)
- Camp 28 (with several lumber spurs into the forest)

In addition, a 2 to 3 mile (3–5 km) section of track used to run from south of Tours to Snowflake. Today's line runs from Tours to Snowflake Junction.
