= Powell River Airport =

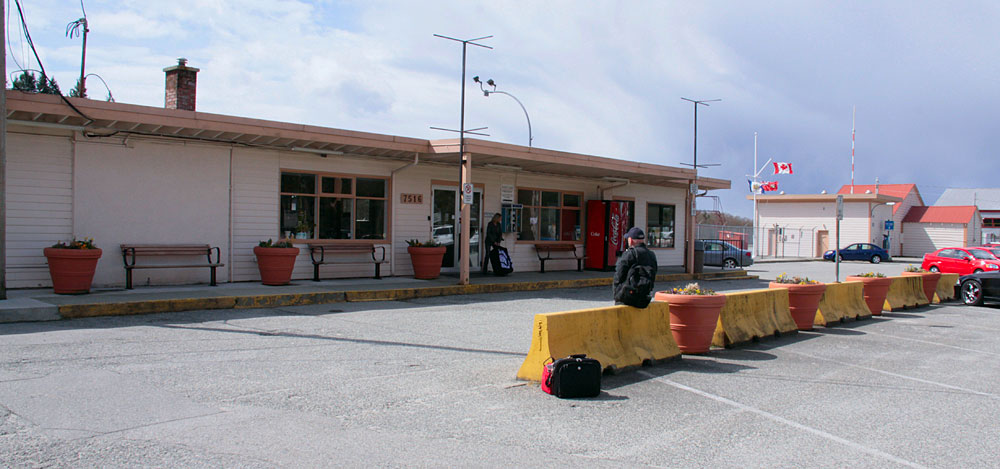
- IATA: YPW; ICAO: CYPW; WMO: 71208

Summary
- Airport type: Public
- Operator: City of Powell River
- Location: Powell River, British Columbia
- Time zone: MST (UTC−07:00)
- Elevation AMSL: 415 ft (126 m)
- Coordinates: 49°50′03″N 124°30′01″W
- Website: powellriver.ca/pages/airport

Map
- Location in British Columbia CYPW (Canada)

Runways
Direction	Length		Surface
Direction	ft	m	Surface
09/27	3,769	1,149	Asphalt

Statistics
- Passenger movement: 39,422 in 2011
- Source: Canada Flight Supplement; Environment Canada

Powell River Airport (IATA: YPW, ICAO: CYPW) is located adjacent to Powell River, British Columbia, Canada. In 2011, the airport had approximately 39,422 passenger departures and arrivals.

== Significance ==
The airport is a significant transport link to the rest of British Columbia. Powell River, while located on the mainland and not an island by definition, is a community isolated by ocean and mountains and is only accessible by water (BC Ferries) or by air.

Powell River is located on Highway 101 but driving the length of the highway requires two ferries before arriving at Horseshoe Bay in West Vancouver. The alternative access to the town is a ferry crossing from Comox on Vancouver Island.

Since the Sunshine Coast is similarly isolated from the rest of the BC mainland, vehicles from Vancouver must take two ferries to reach Powell River (across Howe Sound and the Jervis Inlet, if travelling via Sechelt; and across the Strait of Georgia twice if going via Nanaimo). The surrounding inlets (fjords) banked by mountainous terrain have made land based road connections to other areas of the BC mainland an expensive proposal. One land based route connecting Powell River to Highway 99 near Squamish has been studied, but would require two tunnels (4.5 km (2.8 mi) and 8.0 km (5.0 mi) long) and cost around $5 billion. All of the city's roads are two-lane residential roads, and Highway 101 merges with Marine Avenue to form the city's main street.

== Airlines and destinations ==
Airlines	Destinations
Pacific Coastal Airlines	Vancouver
