= Biron Mill =

Pulp and paper mill in Biron, Wisconsin, U.S.

- Built: 1895
- Location: Biron, Wisconsin, United States
- Industry: Pulp and paper
- Products: Brown Packaging Paper
- Employees: 315 (2023)
- Owner(s): Nine Dragons Paper Holdings Limited

Biron Mill is a pulp mill and paper mill located in the US town of Biron, Wisconsin, in the outskirts of Wisconsin Rapids. Now part of Nine Dragons Paper Holdings Limited, the mill passed through many hands in its history including Grand Rapids Pulp and Paper Company, which became Consolidated Papers, Stora Enso, NewPage Catalyst Paper and ND Paper. The mill has two paper machines which produce brown packaging paper with 315 full time employees as of April of 2023 down from 425 employees as of 2015.

== The Sawmill ==
Before the paper mill was built on the land a sawmill occupied the property on the river. The sawmill was built in 1837 but did not see its first log raft until 1839. Frances Biron Sr. purchased the sawmill and the land it stood on in 1846 and rebuilt the mill in 1853. The sawmill operated until 1888 and the land stood idle. The land was acquired by George Severe Biron, Frances Biron's youngest son after his death.

== White House ==
The White House was a very rich piece of history that stood on the land of the Biron paper mill. Built in 1865 the 3,300 square foot, 2-story home featured semi-French windows, hardwood floors, paneled ceilings, and outside scalloped edging, gables and a front and side porch. The house was surrounded by gardens and Elm trees. The Biron family lived here for many years and the house later became an office space for Consolidated Papers. ND Paper demolished the White House despite an attempt to sell it to the community for $1 and have it moved.

== History ==
On December 14, 1892, the Grand Rapids Pulp and Paper Company was incorporated by J.D. Witter, George Biron, J.W. Cameron, Daly S Sampson and E.T. Hartmon. Construction started on the Biron Paper Mill in 1895 as a brick pulp and paper mill starting with two paper machines commonly known as PM21 & PM22. It originally focused on production of wallpaper and newsprint. George Biron acted as Assistant Manager for the mill up until his death in 1899. In 1911 Consolidated Water Power and Paper Company acquired the mill which became Consolidated Papers in 1962.

The focus on wallpaper and newsprint came to an end in the 1930s when the mill discontinued the production of newsprint and started to produce book and writing papers. One of the older machines was converted to make paperboard in the 1940s during WWII. The paperboard was made to government standards and was used for gliders during the war. Over the mills rich history it has seen 6 paper machines 4 of which have been disassembled and only PM25 and PM26 remain in operation.

Biron Paper Mill Owners
1895	Grand Rapids Pulp and Paper Company
1911	Consolidated Water, Power and Paper Company
1962	Consolidated Water, Power and Paper Company changed name to Consolidated Papers
2000	Stora Enso
2007	NewPage
2015	Catalyst Paper
2018	ND Paper

Additions and Add-ons
1915	Grinder room was built, 14 hydraulic pocket grinders were installed for use of groundwood
1922	Construction began on Paper Machine 23 with J.B. Purvis as Mill Manager
1923	Biron Mill produces first coated paper on PM23 and a finishing room was added on the west end of PM21
1925	More coating equipment is added to PM23.
1937	Finishing room is expanded
1945	Construction of Paper Machine 24 begins along with a new clock house, locker rooms, boiler house, and maintenance shop. Grinder room is also expanded to add two electric grinders
1946	Trainshed was built on the south side of PM24
Oct.13th 1947	PM24 is started for the first time
	Construction on Paper Machine 25 begins Grinder room is expanded to add 3 electric grinders
1956	New trainshed built northwest of the boiler house
1984	Consolidated Papers launches a $215 million mill expansion which includes the construction of Paper Machine 26
1985	Construction of PM26

== New beginnings ==
In 2022 the mill discontinued making white paper on their smaller paper machine(B25) and began to make brown packaging paper using recycled materials but continued to make white kraft paper on their larger machine(B26) until April of 2023. This was part of a $189 million plan for a new OCC plant and the rebuild and recommission of PM25. The Biron mill produced its last reel of white kraft paper on April 1, 2023, and produces all brown packaging paper of bag, medium and liner grades.

Biron's B25 machine produces about 270,000 short tons of corrugating medium and linerboard yearly. The B26 machine has the capacity to produce 500,000 short tons of packaging paper yearly. The conversion from white paper to brown paper included the construction of two different Old Corrugated Container(OCC) plants which takes landfill bound waste cardboard and produces renewable fiber-based pulp. The mill now houses a 700 ton OCC plant and a 1400 ton OCC plant as well as the two paper machines.
