= Powell River, British Columbia =

Powell River
- City
- City of Powell River
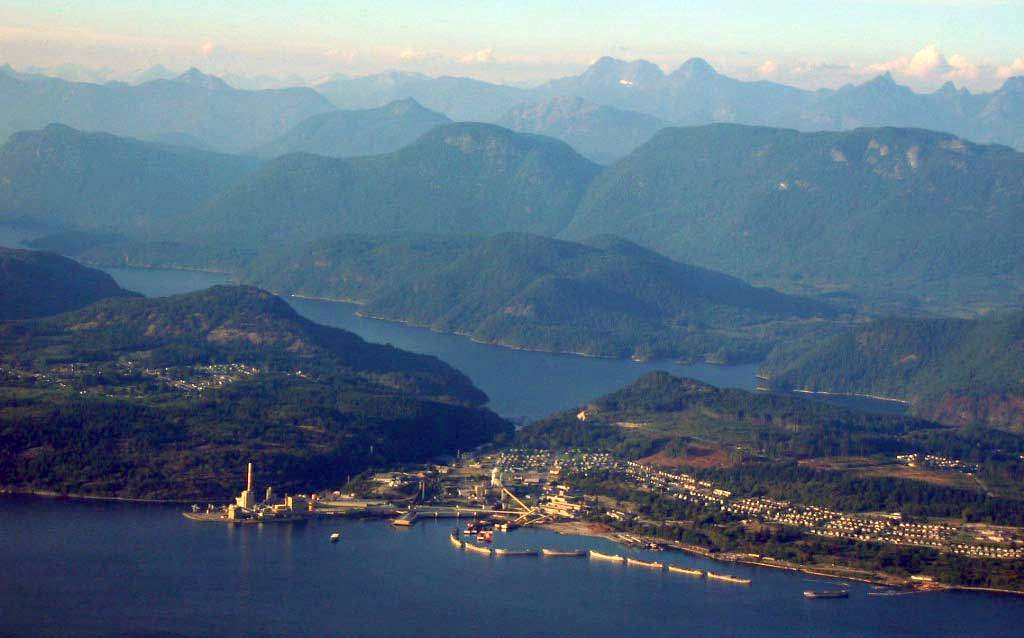
- Powell River Mill and townsite area of Powell River. The river runs from Powell Lake (background) to the mill.

- Location of Powell River
- Coordinates: 49°50′08″N 124°31′28″W
- Country: Canada
- Province: British Columbia
- Region: Sunshine Coast
- Regional District: qathet Regional District
- Established: 1912
- Incorporated: 1955
- Reincorporated as a City: 2005

Government
  - Mayor: Ron Woznow
  - City Council: List of Councillors: Cindy Elliot; Maggie Hathaway; CaroleAnn Leishman; Jim Palm; George Doubt; Rob Southcott

Area
  - City: 28.91 km^{2} (11.16 sq mi)
  - Metro: 799.80 km^{2} (308.80 sq mi)
- Elevation: 50 m (160 ft)

Population (2021)
  - City: 13,943
  - Density: 482.4/km^{2} (1,249/sq mi)
  - Metro: 17,825
  - Metro density: 22.3/km^{2} (58/sq mi)
- District pop = 21,496
- Time zone: UTC−07:00 (MST year-round)
- Forward sortation area: V8A
- Area codes: 604, 778, 236, 672
- Website: powellriver.ca

Powell River is a city on the northern Sunshine Coast of southwestern British Columbia, Canada. Most of its population lives near the eastern shores of Malaspina Strait, which is part of the larger Georgia Strait between Vancouver Island and the Mainland. With two intervening long, steep-sided fjords inhibiting the construction of a contiguous road connection with Vancouver to the south, geographical surroundings explain Powell River's remoteness as a community, despite relative proximity to Vancouver and other populous areas of the BC Coast. The city is the location of the head office of the qathet Regional District.

== History ==
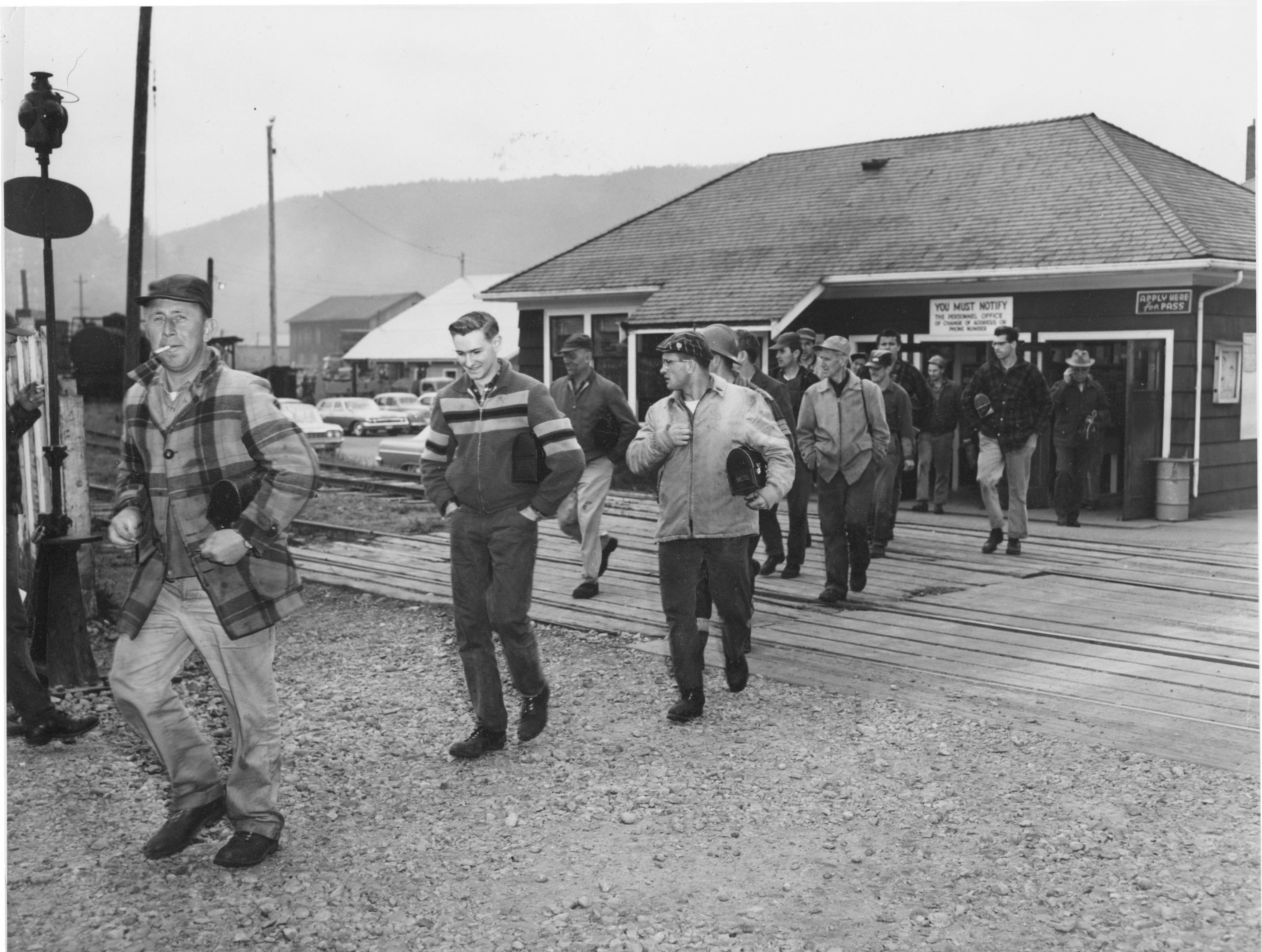
Town millworkers chartered the first credit union in British Columbia in 1939.

The Powell River was named for Israel Wood Powell. Powell was B.C.'s first superintendent for Indian Affairs and a chief architect of colonial policies, including the establishment of residential schools in British Columbia and the banning of the potlatch. He was traveling up the coast of BC in 1881 and the river and lake were named after him.

Powell was a supporter of B.C. being part of the union with Canada and brought the first Canadian flag to BC on June 17, 1871.

Construction of the pulp mill was started in 1908, with a corresponding townsite company town commenced in 1910: the first roll of paper was produced at Powell River Mill in 1912. Similarly, large logging companies had earlier moved in to take advantage of the huge timber. Brooks, Scanlon & Obrien; Bloedel, Stewart and Welch; and Theodosia Logging were but a few logging companies, with the Brooks brothers (Dwight and Anson) and M.J. Scanlon forming the Powell River Company, western Canada's first pulp and paper mill. The Historic Townsite District is an exceptionally well preserved early 20th Century planned community, and was designated a National Historic Site of Canada in 1995. The Townsite Heritage Society has suggested the neighbourhood was planned according to the principles of the Garden City Movement. However, this isn't corroborated by the district's listing in the Canadian Register of Historic Places, and recent work has been addressed misconceptions surrounding Ebenezer Howard's Garden City concept.

When the British Columbia Credit Unions Act was passed in 1939, a study club organized by local millworkers secured the first charter with a deposit of $48.30. The mill provided a small office space at very low rent in the early years. By 1955, when the Powell River Credit Union (now 'First Credit Union') moved into a permanent office, it had over 3,000 members and $1 million in assets.

In March 1944, the former Canadian Steamships five-masted lumber schooner (and some-time rum runner) Malahat began taking on water while being towed in the Barkley Sound. She was then moved to Powell River where she was made part of the breakwater.

The mill in Powell River was at one time the largest pulp and paper mill in the world. In its prime, one in every 25 newspapers in the world was printed on paper from the Powell River mill. However, it later significantly cut back on production, in the 21st century producing newsprint and specialty papers for Catalyst Paper. In 2019, Paper Excellence Group acquired Catalyst Paper. In 2023, the mill was permanently curtailed. Most recently, the Tla'amin First Nation and Domtar (rebranded from Paper Excellence) reached an agreement in March 2025 to reclaim a large portion of the mill land.

The subsequent diversification of the local economy led to an increased focus on ecotourism and the arts, in addition to more traditional resources like mining, fishing, and general forestry. In recognition of its strong arts and cultural programs, Powell River was named a "Cultural Capital of Canada" in 2004.

Prior to the arrival of Europeans, tiskʷat (tees-kwut) was the name for both the river and a village located on its banks, where Tla'amin people were forcibly removed from in the 1880s. Their present-day village, tišosəm (t-eh-show-sum) is also referred to as Sliammon (the archaic English adaptation of Tla'amin).

== Sports teams ==
Powell River is host to the Powell River Kings, a member team of the British Columbia Hockey League, and the Powell River Regals, a Senior Men's hockey team, founded in 1955 and winner of 3 national and several provincial championships. The Powell River Villa play in the Vancouver Island Soccer League. Powell River also has many youth sports teams and associations.

PRMHA is the minor hockey associations with house & rep teams. Powell River's youth baseball league is called the PRMBA. It consists of divisions for are groups 5 and 18. Powell River's gymnastics association has produced many reputable gymnasts.

== Attractions ==
In 2020, Powell River received a $10,000 grant from the government of British Columbia to support tourism in the town. Nearby Texada Island, with quiet beaches and lakes, provides tourism opportunities and is a common weekend destination for the cities' residents. Both Texada Island and Powell River are popular for fishing, hunting, sailing, power boating camping and remote hiking.

The Spanish renaissance-style Patricia Theatre is Canada's oldest continuously operating theatre, first built in 1913 and then rebuilt in 1928. The qathet Museum and Archives depicts the interactions between the pioneers and First Nations as well as showing the tools and items that would have been used by those groups. The Townsite Heritage Society was formed in 1992 to maintain and promote the historical character of the traditional neighbourhood and business section of the Powell River Townsite.

Powell River hosts a number of festivals that highlight local interest and culture, including the Blackberry Festival, Pacific Region International Summer Music Academy (PRISMA) Festival, Logger Sports, Townsite Jazz Festival, International Choral Kathaumixw, and the Sunshine Music Festival.

The City of Powell River and surrounding area are home to over 400 Km’s of cycling trails. Volunteer built and maintained, the two largest areas for cycling are Duck Lake (XC riding) and Mount Mahony (Enduro riding). In 2023 after many years of work by the qathet Regional Cycling Association, the province of BC granted authority to the club to establish a new parking lot and professionally built climb and descent trails that continue to expand.

Powell River is home to the Sunshine Coast Trail, Canada's longest hut-to-hut hiking trail. The free-access 180 kilometre back-country trail meanders through a wide variety of landscapes, including coastal shorelines, old-growth forest, panoramic mountaintops, pristine creeks and lakes and salmon streams.

== Transportation ==
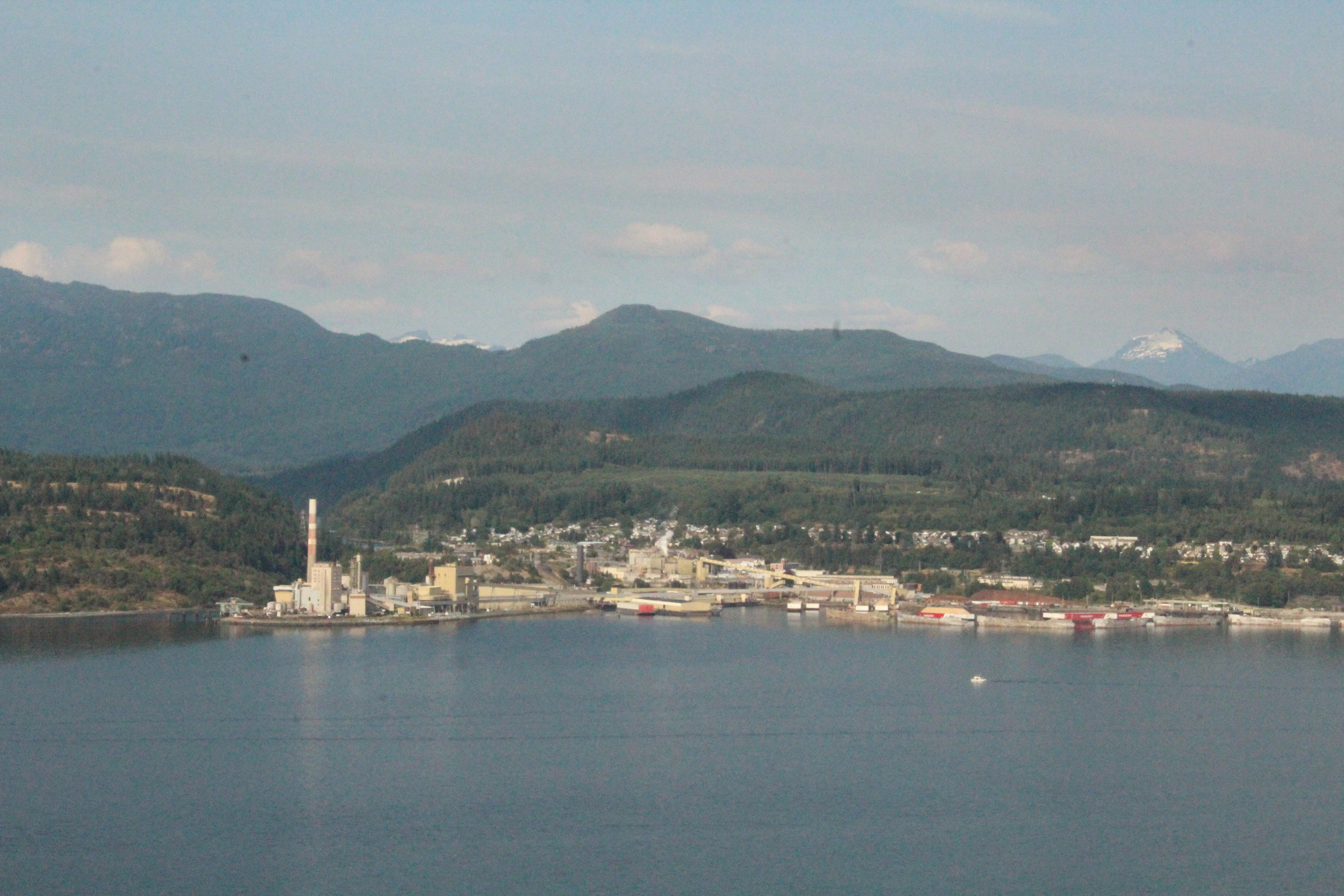
Ports at Powell River

While located on the mainland and not an island by definition, Powell River is a community isolated by ocean and mountains and is only accessible by water (BC Ferries) or by air (Powell River Airport). Powell River is located on Highway 101 but driving the length of the highway requires two ferries before arriving at Horseshoe Bay in West Vancouver. The alternative access to the town is a ferry crossing from Comox on Vancouver Island. Since the Sunshine Coast is similarly isolated from the rest of the BC mainland, vehicles from Vancouver must take two ferries to reach Powell River (across Howe Sound and the Jervis Inlet, if travelling via Sechelt; and across Georgia Strait twice if going via Nanaimo). The surrounding inlets (fjords) banked by mountainous terrain have made land based road connections to other areas of the BC mainland an expensive proposal. One land based route connecting Powell River to Highway 99 near Squamish has been studied, but would require two tunnels (4.5 km and 8.0 km long) and cost around 5 billion dollars. All of the city's roads are two-lane residential roads, and Highway 101 merges with Marine Avenue to form the city's main street.

Powell River has two ferry terminals, both of which belong to BC Ferries. The Westview Ferry Terminal is located near the city's downtown and provides service to Comox and Vancouver Island on board the Salish Eagle, and to Texada Island on the Island Discovery. The Saltery Bay Ferry Terminal is located 23 km south on Highway 101 and provides access to the Sunshine Coast on the Malaspina Sky via route to Earl's Cove near Skookumchuck Narrows.

Powell River has a small airport with a single 1,200 meter long runway and indoor waiting terminal. It is serviced by Pacific Coastal Airlines, which offers 20- to 25-minute flights between Powell River Airport and the South Terminal of Vancouver's International Airport. Charter flights and private aircraft also make use the runway on a regular basis.

The City of Powell River also has a small network of public transportation bus routes, run by BC Transit with 6 routes.

== City of Powell River ==
The City of Powell River includes the original Townsite, which became designated a National Historic District in 1995, one of only seven in Canada. There is also the more populous Westview, and the Cranberry and Wildwood areas. On October 15, 2005, coinciding with its 50th anniversary of incorporation, Powell River was officially designated a city.

Townsite and Cranberry are connected by three roads by the names of Lombardy Ave, Timberlane Ave, and Hemlock Street.

== Demographics ==
In the 2021 Census of Population conducted by Statistics Canada, Powell River had a population of 13,943 living in 6,402 of its 6,718 total private dwellings, a change of 6% from its 2016 population of 13,157. With a land area of 28.91 km^{2} (11.16 sq mi), it had a population density of 482.3/km^{2} (1,249.1/sq mi) in 2021.

The median household income in 2005 for Powell River was $46,777, which is below the British Columbia provincial average of $52,709.

=== Ethnicity ===
Panethnic groups in the City of Powell River (2001−2021)
Panethnic group	2021		2016		2011		2006		2001	
Panethnic group	Pop.	%	Pop.	%	Pop.	%	Pop.	%	Pop.	%
European (Note: Statistic includes all persons that did not make up part of a visible minority or an indigenous identity.)	11,970	87.79%	11,730	91.21%	11,770	92.13%	11,950	94.17%	12,045	94.18%
Indigenous	835	6.12%	650	5.05%	710	5.56%	370	2.92%	500	3.91%
East Asian (Note: Statistic includes total responses of "Chinese", "Korean", and "Japanese" under visible minority section on census.)	310	2.27%	165	1.28%	60	0.47%	180	1.42%	55	0.43%
South Asian	150	1.1%	55	0.43%	75	0.59%	35	0.28%	65	0.51%
Southeast Asian (Note: Statistic includes total responses of "Filipino" and "Southeast Asian" under visible minority section on census.)	140	1.03%	140	1.09%	55	0.43%	60	0.47%	70	0.55%
Latin American	95	0.7%	10	0.08%	0	0%	15	0.12%	25	0.2%
African	75	0.55%	80	0.62%	50	0.39%	50	0.39%	20	0.16%
Middle Eastern (Note: Statistic includes total responses of "West Asian" and "Arab" under visible minority section on census.)	25	0.18%	0	0%	0	0%	0	0%	10	0.08%
Other/multiracial (Note: Statistic includes total responses of "Visible minority, n.i.e." and "Multiple visible minorities" under visible minority section on census.)	35	0.26%	30	0.23%	35	0.27%	10	0.08%	10	0.08%
Total responses	13,635	97.79%	12,860	97.74%	12,775	97.04%	12,690	97.94%	12,790	98.51%
Total population	13,943	100%	13,157	100%	13,165	100%	12,957	100%	12,983	100%
Note: Totals greater than 100% due to multiple origin responses.

=== Religion ===
According to the 2021 census, religious groups in Powell River included:

- Irreligion (8,405 persons or 61.6%)
- Christianity (4,855 persons or 35.6%)
- Hinduism (60 persons or 0.4%)
- Buddhism (50 persons or 0.4%)
- Sikhism (35 persons or 0.3%)
- Judaism (30 persons or 0.2%)
- Indigenous Spirituality (25 persons or 0.2%)
- Islam (20 persons or 0.1%)

== Geography ==
=== Climate and ecosystem ===
The city and surrounding area are one of the most Northerly places in the world with a warm-summer Mediterranean climate (Köppen: Csb), characterised by warm, dry summers and mild, wet winters. In winter the temperature rarely reaches below freezing, and the mean daily summer temperatures are between 12°C and 22°C. The city averages 1,205.4mm of precipitation per year, with the majority falling as rain in the winter. There were an average of 176 days with rain and 6 days with snow per year between 1981 and 2010.

The abundant precipitation and mild temperatures result in the ecosystem being a temperate rainforest, and Powell River is located in the Coastal Western Hemlock biogeoclimatic zone. The forests in the surrounding area are primarily composed of Douglas fir, western redcedar and western hemlock, and the understory contains many types of moss, ferns, and shrubs.

Climate data for Powell River Airport
Month	Jan	Feb	Mar	Apr	May	Jun	Jul	Aug	Sep	Oct	Nov	Dec	Year
Record high humidex	13.2	14.9	18	24.8	35.5	42.2	39.6	34.8	32.9	27.1	17.1	15.1	42.2
Record high °C (°F)	15 (59)	17.8 (64.0)	18.9 (66.0)	25.6 (78.1)	34.1 (93.4)	38.4 (101.1)	34.4 (93.9)	34.3 (93.7)	31.5 (88.7)	24.9 (76.8)	15.6 (60.1)	13.9 (57.0)	38.4 (101.1)
Mean daily maximum °C (°F)	5.8 (42.4)	6.9 (44.4)	9.4 (48.9)	12.8 (55.0)	16.5 (61.7)	19.4 (66.9)	22.1 (71.8)	22.3 (72.1)	18.7 (65.7)	12.6 (54.7)	7.7 (45.9)	5.3 (41.5)	13.3 (55.9)
Daily mean °C (°F)	3.6 (38.5)	3.9 (39.0)	5.9 (42.6)	8.6 (47.5)	11.9 (53.4)	14.9 (58.8)	17.2 (63.0)	17.2 (63.0)	14.1 (57.4)	9.4 (48.9)	5.3 (41.5)	3.1 (37.6)	9.6 (49.3)
Mean daily minimum °C (°F)	1.2 (34.2)	0.9 (33.6)	2.3 (36.1)	4.3 (39.7)	7.3 (45.1)	10.4 (50.7)	12.3 (54.1)	12.1 (53.8)	9.4 (48.9)	6.1 (43.0)	2.8 (37.0)	0.9 (33.6)	5.8 (42.4)
Record low °C (°F)	−16.7 (1.9)	−15 (5)	−12.2 (10.0)	−5 (23)	−4.4 (24.1)	1.7 (35.1)	3.9 (39.0)	1.7 (35.1)	−1.1 (30.0)	−5.5 (22.1)	−14.4 (6.1)	−13.9 (7.0)	−16.7 (1.9)
Record low wind chill	−8.7	−15.8	−7.8	−1.9	0	0	0	0	0	−5.2	−16	−13	−16
Average precipitation mm (inches)	158.9 (6.26)	109.4 (4.31)	110.7 (4.36)	83.3 (3.28)	76.6 (3.02)	67.6 (2.66)	37.5 (1.48)	45.3 (1.78)	54.7 (2.15)	125.8 (4.95)	178 (7.0)	157.8 (6.21)	1,205.4 (47.46)
Average rainfall mm (inches)	145.7 (5.74)	101.9 (4.01)	104.2 (4.10)	83.2 (3.28)	76.6 (3.02)	67.6 (2.66)	37.5 (1.48)	45.3 (1.78)	54.7 (2.15)	125.5 (4.94)	171.6 (6.76)	146.5 (5.77)	1,160 (45.7)
Average snowfall cm (inches)	13.6 (5.4)	7.8 (3.1)	6.8 (2.7)	0.1 (0.0)	0 (0)	0 (0)	0 (0)	0 (0)	0 (0)	0.3 (0.1)	6.5 (2.6)	11.5 (4.5)	46.5 (18.3)
Average precipitation days (≥ 0.2 mm)	20.2	16.2	19.3	16.4	13.8	11.5	8	7.8	9.3	17.4	21.3	20.5	181.6
Average rainy days (≥ 0.2 mm)	18.9	15	18.9	16.4	13.8	11.5	8	7.8	9.3	17.3	20.6	19.2	176.7
Average snowy days (≥ 0.2 cm)	3.2	2.1	1.5	0	0	0	0	0	0	0.1	1.6	3.2	11.7
Average relative humidity (%)	85.3	76.2	69.5	61	58.5	59.1	57	57.5	63.3	75.8	83.5	86.5	69.4
Mean monthly sunshine hours	42.8	78.5	128.7	178.1	226.9	224.3	279.6	263.9	207.1	110.9	47.9	35.2	1,823.7
Percentage possible sunshine	16	27.6	35	43.2	47.6	46	56.8	58.9	54.6	33.1	17.5	13.9	37.5

== Education ==
A regional campus of Vancouver Island University is located in Powell River. This campus is called tiwšɛmawtxw (tyew-shem-out-hw), which means house of learning. The name was a gift to the institution from the Tla’amin Nation Executive Council to acknowledge VIU's "readiness and willingness to participate and engage in meaningful reconciliation."

The qathet School District operates eight schools: Brooks Secondary School (high school); James Thomson, Henderson, Edgehill, Westview, Kelly Creek, and Texada (elementary schools); as well as Partners in Education, a provincial online learning school. In 2013, Westview Elementary was opened to replace the old Grief Point School, which is now the location of the Powell River Christian School.

The Conseil scolaire francophone de la Colombie-Britannique operates two Francophone schools: école Côte-du-soleil (primary and junior high school) and école secondaire Brooks.

Private Other elementary schools in the region include Assumption Catholic School (Pre-School, K-9) and Powell River Christian School (Pre-School, K-9).

== Power supply ==
East of Saltery Bay, a powerline crosses Jervis Inlet on a span of 3.1 kilometres (1.9 mi).

== See also ==
- Cortes Island
- Hernando Island
- List of francophone communities in British Columbia
- Savary Island
- Texada Island
- Harwood Island
