= Bulkboek =

Dutch organization promoting reading and the study of literature

Bulkboek (formerly BulkBoek) is a Dutch organization that promotes the reading and study of literature. It began in the early 1970s by issuing cheap reprints of Dutch classic literary works, printed on newsprint in a tabloid newspaper format, for which it sold subscriptions to secondary schools as well as to individuals. In the 1990s, when more and more publishers in the Netherlands were offering affordable paperbacks, it ceased publishing on paper, but continued to promote the reading and teaching of literature in digital publications and by organizing literary festivals and awards. One of its original publishers, though, rebooted the idea in the 2000s.

== History ==
Bulkboek started in 1971 by issuing a series of reprints of famous Dutch literary works by publishers Patty Voorsmit and Theo Knippenberg. The Dutch term "bulkboek" refers to a cheaply made book, in newspaper or magazine format, not bound but stapled, and printed on newsprint—the cheap paper used for newspapers. An annual series consisted of ten issues (which cost fl. 1.50 a piece), and typically had novels, plays, and poetry, and two issues every year on a special theme or a specific writer's oeuvre. All had introductions written by specialists, and other material designed for self-study for students. They were sold by subscription, and made available particularly for the secondary school system, though private individuals could also subscribe. Knippenberg left the company in 1977, because in his opinion it had gotten too big. The earliest Bulkboeken were sold as tabloids, but that was changed to a magazine format, and later still they were issued as paperbacks. Between 1971 and 1999, it published more than 250 titles.

The publisher teamed up with other organizations to promote the reading of literature among schoolchildren, including with literary contests. In the 1990s Bulkboek partnered with NOT, an educational TV broadcaster, to provide the textual material that accompanied literary school programs.

In 1988 the organization founded a parallel foundation, "Bulkboeks Dag van de Literatuur", whose aim it was to start an annual day celebrating literature. The second such day was held in March 1991 in The Hague, and was attended by fiction writers and poets, and 5,500 students from the Netherlands and Belgium. The third one was planned for 1993, and in October 1992 the foundation scheduled a one-day convention for teachers and librarians in Amsterdam. In the 1990s, due to the changes in literature education and the greater availability of cheap paperbacks, the organization stopped publishing on paper. Supported by the Nederlands Letterenfonds, Bulkboek moved to a digital format. In 1995, "Passionate Bulkboek" was founded, which organizes a number of literary events and festivals and is active in supporting education in the literary arts.

== Return of the Bulkboeken ==
In 1988, years after leaving the company, Knippenberg began publishing a series called "Budgetboeken", which were budget-priced reprints of Dutch literary works with additional informational and educational material, including readings by the author, on cassette tapes. In 2007 he began publishing Bulkboeken again, on newsprint and in tabloid format; a series of literary classics from the early Middle Ages to the 19th century, was published in magazine format again. A year-long subscription to those Bulkboeken, 12 issues, cost 18 euros.
