= Bleached Chemi-ThermoMechanical Pulp =

Pulp product used in paper production

Bleached Chemi-ThermoMechanical Pulp (BCTMP) is a pulp product used by the paper industry as a less-expensive alternative for Northern Bleached Softwood Kraft (NBSK).

BCTMP was first produced by Millar Western in 1988 in its Whitecourt Mill, and was initially used in lower grade paper applications. The product is attractive to producers because it needed less capital to construct the production facilities. It also provides higher yields than other processes, which lowers the total cost of production. In addition, BCTMP provides higher bulk, opacity, and stiffness in the final product, and the process is more environmentally friendly.

== See also ==
- Northern bleached softwood kraft
- Southern bleached softwood kraft
