= Biron, Wisconsin =

- Village
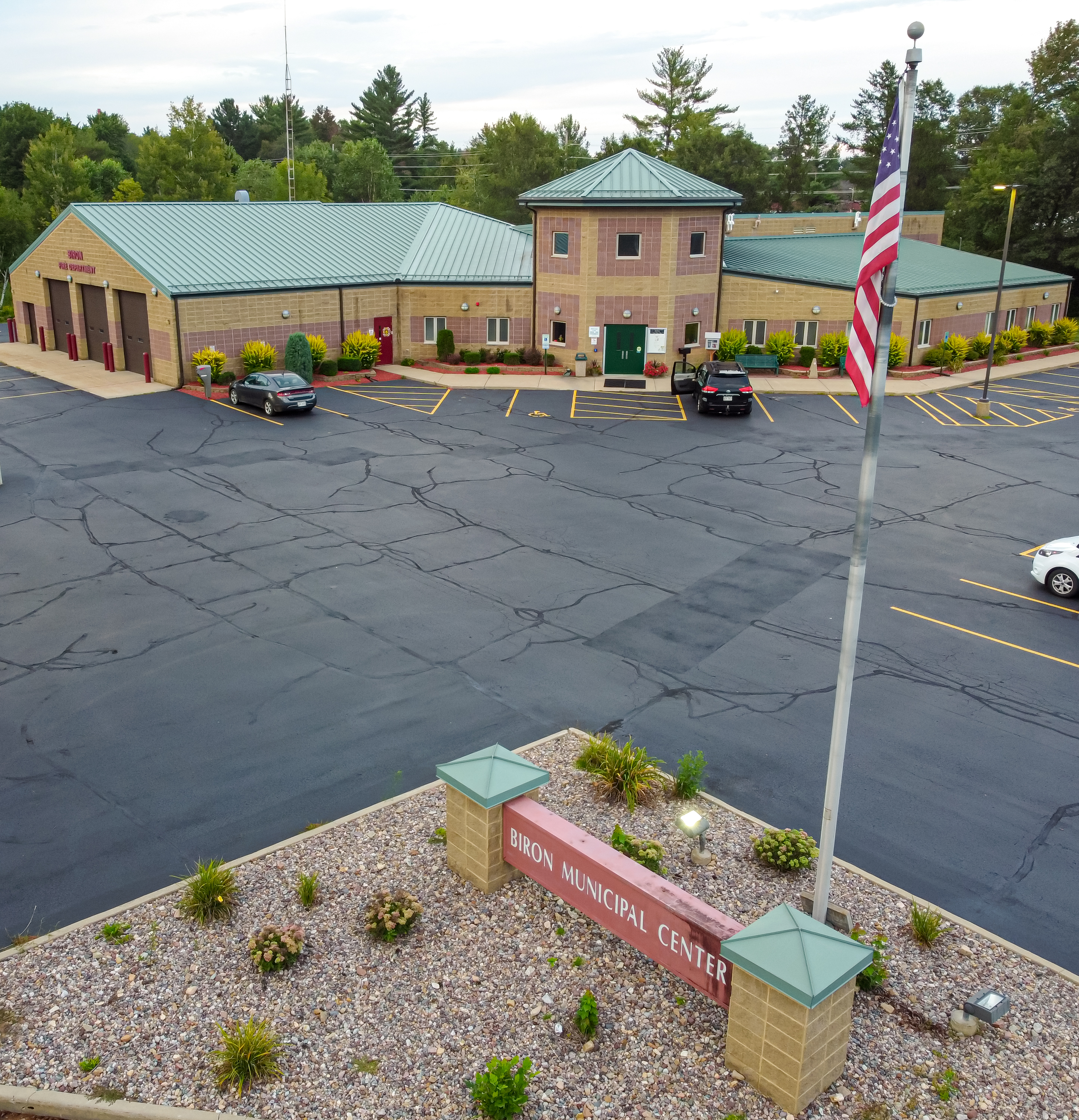
- Village hall

- Location of Biron in Wood County, Wisconsin.
- Coordinates: 44°25′21″N 89°46′44″W
- Country: United States
- State: Wisconsin
- County: Wood

Area
  - Total: 6.28 sq mi (16.26 km^{2})
  - Land: 4.64 sq mi (12.01 km^{2})
  - Water: 1.64 sq mi (4.26 km^{2})
- Elevation: 1,024 ft (312 m)

Population (2020)
  - Total: 839
  - Density: 166.5/sq mi (64.29/km^{2})
- Time zone: UTC-6 (Central (CST))
  - Summer (DST): UTC-5 (CDT)
- Zip code(s): 54494
- Area codes: 715 & 534
- FIPS code: 55-07650
- GNIS feature ID: 1561824
- Website: https://biron.wi.gov/

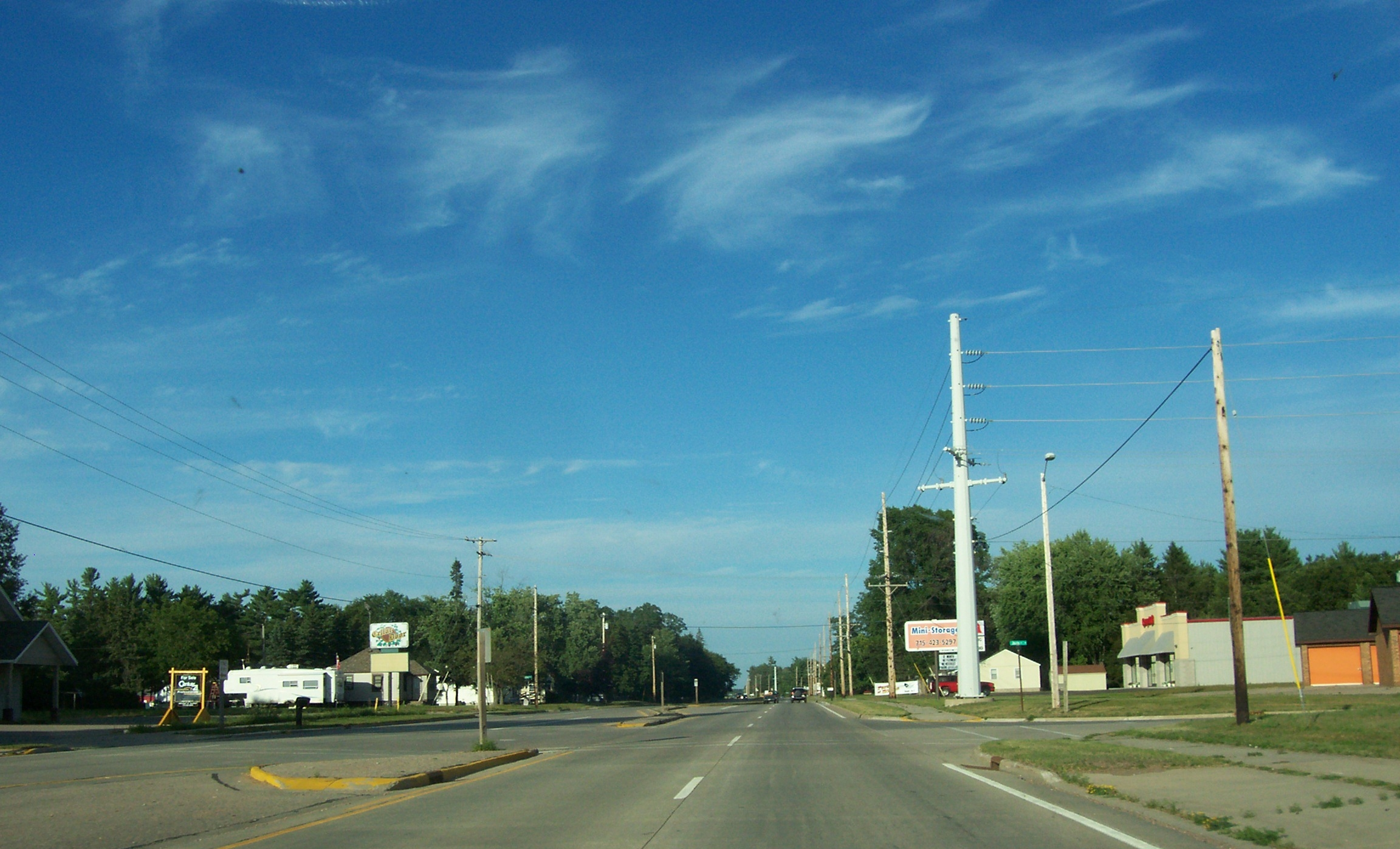
Looking east at Biron on WIS 54

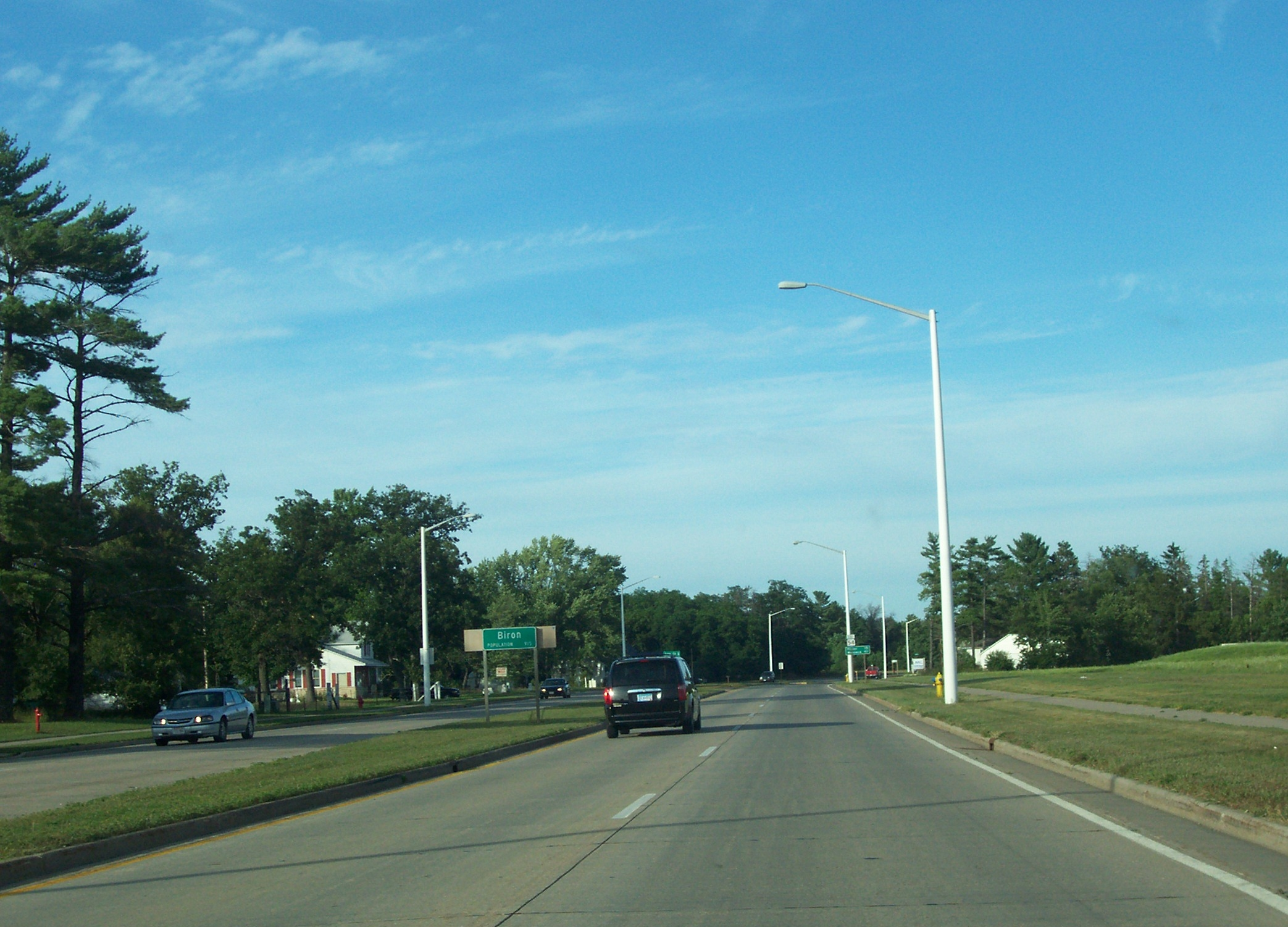
Population sign on WIS 54

Biron is a village in Wood County, Wisconsin, United States. The population was 839 at the 2020 census, representing no change from the 2010 census. It is the site of ND Paper's Biron Mill.

== History ==
The first settlement in Biron was a sawmill that was built in 1839. Francis X. Biron, formerly of Quebec, purchased the mill in 1846. The village was platted in 1896 and incorporated in 1910.

== Geography ==
Biron is located at 44°25′21″N 89°46′44″W (44.422492, -89.778792).

According to the United States Census Bureau, the village has a total area of 6.40 square miles (16.58 km^{2}), of which 4.66 square miles (12.07 km^{2}) is land and 1.74 square miles (4.51 km^{2}) is water.

== Demographics ==
Historical population
Census	Pop.	Note	%±
1920	286		—
1930	380		32.9%
1940	475		25.0%
1950	528		11.2%
1960	726		37.5%
1970	771		6.2%
1980	698		−9.5%
1990	794		13.8%
2000	915		15.2%
2010	839		−8.3%
2020	839		0.0%
U.S. Decennial Census

=== 2010 census ===
As of the census of 2010, there were 839 people, 366 households, and 236 families living in the village. The population density was 180.0 inhabitants per square mile (69.5/km^{2}). There were 402 housing units at an average density of 86.3 per square mile (33.3/km^{2}). The racial makeup of the village was 98.7% White, 0.8% African American, and 0.5% from two or more races. Hispanic or Latino of any race were 0.8% of the population.

There were 366 households, of which 23.5% had children under the age of 18 living with them, 53.3% were married couples living together, 7.1% had a female householder with no husband present, 4.1% had a male householder with no wife present, and 35.5% were non-families. 29.2% of all households were made up of individuals, and 15.3% had someone living alone who was 65 years of age or older. The average household size was 2.24 and the average family size was 2.76.

The median age in the village was 47 years. 19.4% of residents were under the age of 18; 6% were between the ages of 18 and 24; 20.5% were from 25 to 44; 28.7% were from 45 to 64; and 25.5% were 65 years of age or older. The gender makeup of the village was 50.5% male and 49.5% female.

=== 2000 census ===
As of the census of 2000, there were 915 people, 384 households, and 243 families living in the village. The population density was 201.7 people per square mile (77.8/km^{2}). There were 398 housing units at an average density of 87.7 per square mile (33.8/km^{2}). The racial makeup of the village was 96.94% White, 0.44% Native American, 0.33% Asian, 1.20% from other races, and 1.09% from two or more races. Hispanic or Latino of any race were 1.75% of the population.

There were 384 households, out of which 25.3% had children under the age of 18 living with them, 51.6% were married couples living together, 8.1% had a female householder with no husband present, and 36.5% were non-families. 31.8% of all households were made up of individuals, and 16.7% had someone living alone who was 65 years of age or older. The average household size was 2.28 and the average family size was 2.82.

In the village, the population was spread out, with 21.6% under the age of 18, 6.3% from 18 to 24, 25.1% from 25 to 44, 23.0% from 45 to 64, and 23.9% who were 65 years of age or older. The median age was 43 years. For every 100 females, there were 92.6 males. For every 100 females age 18 and over, there were 87.7 males.

The median income for a household in the village was $42,557, and the median income for a family was $51,719. Males had a median income of $37,778 versus $24,028 for females. The per capita income for the village was $19,293. About 3.1% of families and 7.2% of the population were below the poverty line, including 11.4% of those under age 18 and 12.9% of those age 65 or over.

== Notable people ==
A Biron cottage, fronting the Wisconsin River, was the summertime refuge of presidential advisor Philleo Nash and poet and educator Edith Nash. The Nashes lived during the year in Wisconsin Rapids, Wisconsin. Philleo died in 1987 and Edith in 2003.
