= Wood-free paper =

Paper created exclusively from chemical pulp

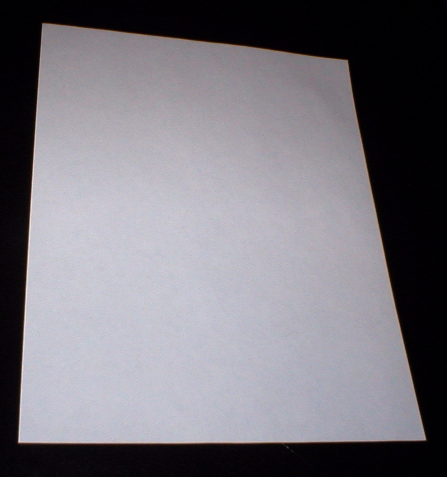
A sheet of wood-free paper

Wood-free paper (also called fine paper) is paper made from chemically processed pulp, typically derived from wood, in which most lignin has been removed through chemical pulping. Despite its name, wood-free paper is generally made from wood pulp and is less susceptible to yellowing than paper containing mechanical pulp.

Tree-free paper is paper made from cellulose obtained from non-tree plant fibers rather than wood. Common fiber sources include bamboo, hemp, kenaf, bagasse (sugarcane residue), cotton, flax, and agricultural residues such as wheat or rice straw. Tree-free paper is distinct from wood-free paper, as the former refers to the source of the cellulose fibers, whereas the latter is an industry term describing chemically pulped paper that is usually made from wood.

== Overview ==
=== Lignin ===
Lignin is a natural complex polymer containing aromatic compounds that provide much of a plant's strength. In its natural form, it gives rigidity and resilience to the plant's structure, but its presence causes paper to weaken and turn yellow as it ages and eventually disintegrate. The reason for this is that as the paper ages, lignin releases acid which degrades the paper. Lignocellulose from the xylem of shrubs and cambium from the inner bark of trees are made up of lignin, hemicellulose and cellulose, relevant to papermaking.

=== Pulp ===
Paper pulp consists of cellulosic materials that have been broken down chemically and physically and filtered and mixed in water to reform into a web: creating pulp by breaking down the materials chemically is called chemical pulping, while creating pulp by breaking them down mechanically is called mechanical pulping.

In the chemical pulping of lignocellulose - plants with lignin content - chemicals separate the wood fibers. The chemicals lower the lignin content because chemical action solubilizes and degrades components of wood fibers, especially hemicelluloses and lignin. Chemical pulping yields single unbroken fibers that produce strong quality papers because the lignin that interferes with hydrogen bonding of wood fibers has been removed. Chemical pulps are used to create wood free paper that is of high quality and lasts long, such as is used in arts and archiving. Chemical pulping processes take place at high pressures and temperatures under aqueous alkaline, neutral or acidic conditions, with the goal of totally removing the lignin and preserving the carbohydrates. Normally, about 90% of the lignin is removed.

Mechanical pulping, in contrast, converts raw lignocellulose into pulp without separating the lignin from the cellulose. No chemicals other than water or steam are used. The yield is about 90% to 98%. High yields result from the fact that lignin is retained. Mechanical pulps are characterized by low cost, high stiffness, high bulk, and high yield. Mechanical pulp has low strength because the lignin interferes with hydrogen bonding between wood fibers. The lignin also makes the pulp turn yellow when exposed to light and air. Mechanical pulps are used in the production of non-permanent papers such as newsprint and magazine paper. Mechanical pulps made up 20% to 25% of the world production and this is increasing because of the high yield of the process and increasing competition for fiber resources. Advances in technology have also made mechanical pulp increasingly desirable.

== Categories ==
=== Woodfree uncoated paper ===
Woodfree uncoated paper (WFU), uncoated woodfree paper (UWF) or uncoated fine papers is the paper industry technical term for base wood-free paper. Both softwood and hardwood chemical pulps are used and a minor part of mechanical pulp might be added (often of aspen or poplar). These paper grades are calendered. The properties are good strength, high brightness and good archival characteristics. They provide less glare than woodfree coated paper (WFC) as there is no coating involved.

=== Offset paper ===
Offset paper is a type of woodfree uncoated paper primarily designed for offset printing. It can range from 60 gsm (grammage, or grams per square meter), to over 200 gsm. Lighter weights can compose brochures and flyers, while heavier weights are used for packaging and other durable applications. SC (supercalendered) offset paper has an ISO brightness of > 67% and a surface strength is optimized for offset printing.

== Composition ==
Wood-free paper is made from a variety of raw materials, including

- Tissue pulp: This is the most common type of wood-free paper. It is made from wood pulp that has been treated with chemicals to remove the lignin.
- Balsa pulp: This is a type of wood pulp that is made from balsa trees. It is very strong and lightweight, making it ideal for use in envelopes and other lightweight applications.
- Coniferous pulp: This is a type of wood pulp that is made from coniferous trees, such as pine and fir. It is strong and durable, making it ideal for use in writing and printing papers.
- Non-wood pulp: This is a type of pulp that is made from non-wood materials, such as cotton, hemp, kenaf, linen, and bamboo. It is often used in high-quality papers, such as those used for art and photography.

Wood-free paper has a number of advantages over paper that contains mechanical pulp:

- Wood-free paper is more resistant to yellowing because lignin, the main cause of paper yellowing, has been removed from the pulp.
- It is stronger because the cellulose fibers in wood-free paper are longer and more uniform than the fibers in mechanical pulp.
- It is more durable because it is less likely to tear or crease.
- It is smoother because its surface is more refined than that of paper containing mechanical pulp.

Wood-free paper is used in a variety of applications:

- Writing and printing papers: Wood-free paper is the most common type of paper used for writing and printing. It is available in a variety of weights and finishes.
- Envelopes: Wood-free paper is the most common type of paper used for envelopes. It is available in a variety of colors and finishes.
- Art and photography papers: Wood-free paper is the most common type of paper used for art and photography.
- Other applications: Wood-free paper is also used in a variety of other applications, such as packaging, labels, and currency

== See also ==
- Coated fine paper
