= Northern bleached softwood kraft =

Type of pulp used to make paper

Northern bleached softwood kraft (NBSK) is the paper industry's benchmark grade of pulp. Market NBSK is produced mainly in Canada and the Nordic countries. Some NBSK is also produced in north-western United States and in Russia. NBSK futures are traded on the Chicago Mercantile Exchange.

== Properties ==
This pulp grade is very diverse. All NBSK pulps have long fibers and is often used as reinforcement pulp.

NBSK from British Columbia is mainly from Lodgepole Pine, with a significant amount of White Spruce. Redcedar, douglas fir, hemlock, and larch make up a smaller portion of the chip furnish. NBSK is known for having longer fiber lengths and larger fiber diameter than anywhere else in the world due to very long growing season and mild climate.

NBSK from Siberia is made from pine, spruce and european larch and tend to be shorter and thinner than other NBSK pulps due to the short growing season. The larch makes up about 15% of the wood furnish and gives a rather coarse fiber that makes Siberian NBSK less desirable as reinforcement pulp.

The only single species NBSK is of plantation radiata pine from New Zealand, Brazil and Chile. It has good brightness and cleanliness that is appreciated in printing and writing papers.

NBSK from Scandinavia is only from scots pine and norway spruce in the normal mix 7:3. The mix might vary much with the season as norway spruce grows on wetter lands that is easier accessed in the winter when the ground is frozen.

== Applications ==
The most common use of NBSK is as reinforcement fibres when making paper or as raw material for kraft paper. It is also used in tissue paper.

== See also ==
- Southern bleached softwood kraft
