= Newsprint =

Low-cost paper used to print newspapers

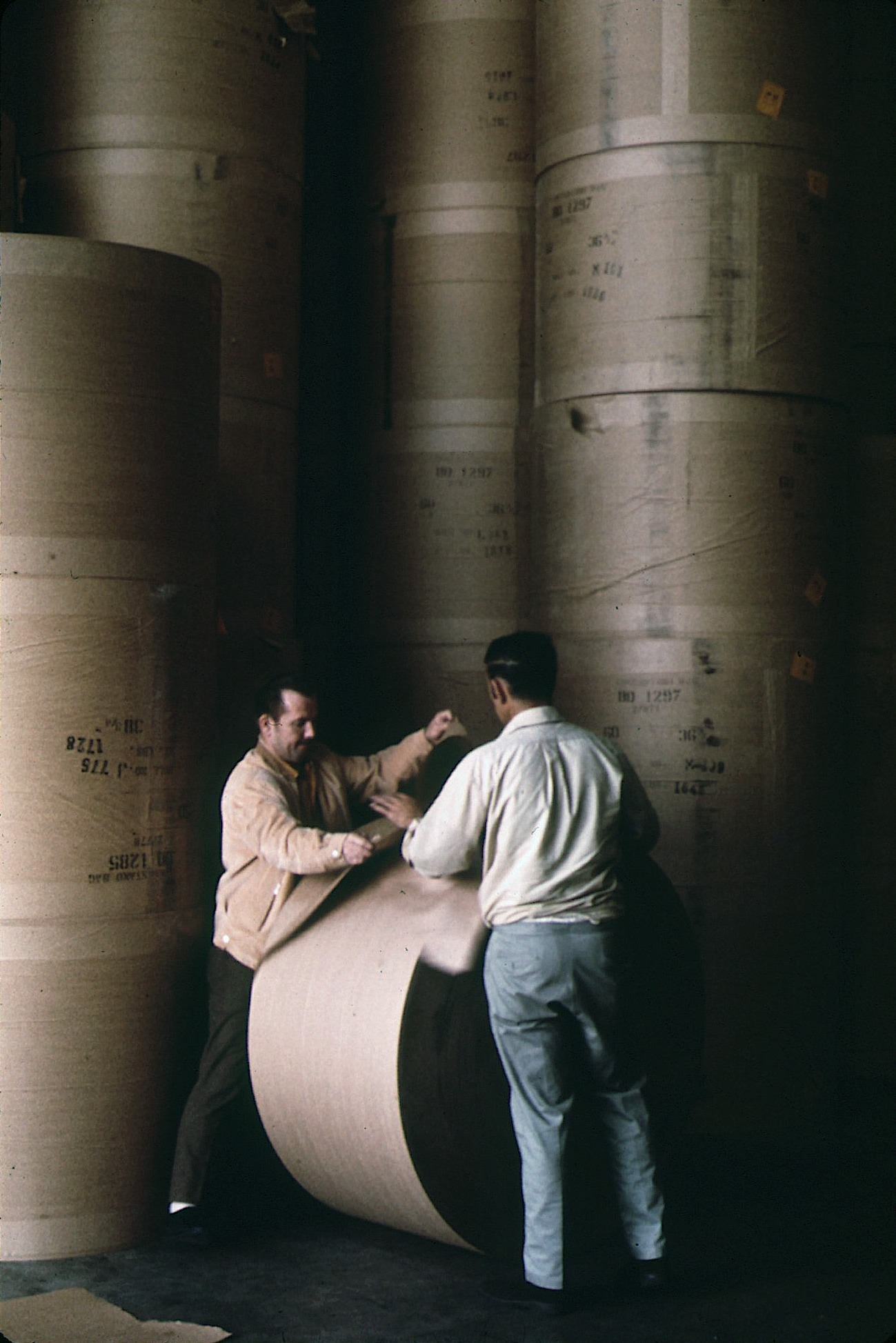
Rolls of newsprint

Newsprint is a low-cost, non-archival type of paper, consisting mainly of wood pulp and most commonly used to print newspapers and other publications and advertising material. Invented in 1844 by Charles Fenerty of Nova Scotia, Canada, it usually has an off-white cast and distinctive feel. It is designed for use in printing presses that employ a long web of paper (web offset, letterpress and flexographic), rather than individual sheets of paper.

Newsprint is favored by publishers and printers as it is relatively low cost (compared with paper grades used for glossy magazines and sales brochures), strong (to run through modern high-speed web printing presses) and can accept four-color printing at qualities that meet the needs of typical newspapers.

== Invention ==
Charles Fenerty began experimenting with wood pulp around 1838, making his discovery in 1844. On October 26, 1844, Fenerty took a sample of his paper to Halifax's top newspaper, the Acadian Recorder, where he had written a letter on his newly invented paper saying:

Messrs. English & Blackadar,

Enclosed is a small piece of paper, the result of an experiment I have made, in order to ascertain if that useful article might not be manufactured from wood. The result has proved that opinion to be correct, for—by the sample which I have sent you, Gentlemen—you will perceive the feasibility of it. The enclosed, which is as firm in its texture as white, and to all appearance as durable as the common wrapping paper made from hemp, Cotton, or the ordinary materials of manufacture is actually composed of spruce wood, reduced to a pulp, and subjected to the same treatment as paper is in course of being made, only with this exception, viz: my insufficient means of giving it the required pressure. I entertain an opinion that our common forest trees, either hard or soft wood, but more especially the fir, spruce, or poplar, on account of the fibrous quality of their wood, might easily be reduced by a chafing machine, and manufactured into paper of the finest kind. This opinion, Sirs, I think the experiment will justify, and leaving it to be prosecuted further by the scientific, or the curious. I remain, Gentlemen, your obdt. servant,

CHARLES FENERTY.

The Acadian Recorder
Halifax, N.S.
Saturday, October 26, 1844

== Use ==
The web of paper is placed on the printer, in the form of a roll of paper, from a paper mill (surplus newsprint can also be cut into individual sheets by a processor for use in a variety of other applications such as wrapping or commercial printing). World demand of newsprint in 2006 totaled about 37.2 million metric tonnes, according to the Montreal-based Pulp & Paper Products Council (PPPC). This was about 1.6% less than in 2000. Between 2000 and 2006, the biggest changes were in Asia—which saw newsprint demand grow by about 20%—and North America, where demand fell by about 25%. Demand in China virtually doubled during the period, to about 3.2 million metric tonnes.

About 35% of global newsprint usage in 2006 was in Asia, with approximately 26% being in North America and about 25% in Western Europe. Latin America and Eastern Europe each represented about 5% of world demand in 2006, according to PPPC, with smaller shares going to Oceania and Africa.

Among the biggest factors depressing demand for newsprint in North America have been the decline in newspaper readership among many sectors of the population—particularly young adults—along with increasing competition for advertising business from the Internet and other media. According to the Newspaper Association of America, a United States newspaper trade group, average U.S. daily circulation in 2006 on a typical weekday was 52.3 million (53.2 million on Sundays), compared with 62.5 million in 1986 (58.9 million on Sundays) and 57.0 million in 1996 (60.8 million on Sundays). According to NAA, daily ad revenues (not adjusted for inflation) reached their all-time peak in 2000, and by 2007 had fallen by 13%. Newsprint demand has also been affected by attempts on the part of newspaper publishers to reduce marginal printing costs through various conservation measures intended to cut newsprint usage.

While demand has been trending down in North America in recent years, the rapid economic expansion of such Asian countries as China and India greatly benefited the print newspaper, and thus their newsprint suppliers. According to the World Association of Newspapers, in 2007 Asia was the home to 74 of the world's 100 highest-circulation dailies. With millions of Chinese and Indians entering the ranks of those with disposable income, newspapers have gained readers along with other news media.

Newsprint is used worldwide in the printing of newspapers, flyers, and other printed material intended for mass distribution. In the U.S., about 80% of all newsprint that is consumed is purchased by daily newspaper publishers, according to PPPC. Dailies use a large majority of total demand in most other regions as well. Newsprint is also used for cheap books, such as the Dutch Bulkboeken, affordable reprints of literary classics published from the 1970s on.

Typically in North America, newsprint is purchased by a daily newspaper publisher and is shipped from the mill to the publisher's pressroom or pressrooms, where it is used to print the main body of the newspaper (called the run-of-press, or ROP, sections). The daily newspaper publisher may also be hired by outside companies such as advertisers or publishers of weekly newspapers or other daily newspapers to produce printed products for those companies using its presses. In such cases the press owner might also purchase newsprint from the mill for such contract printing jobs.

For the roughly 20% of demand which is not purchased by a daily newspaper, common end uses include the printing of weekly newspapers, advertising flyers and other printed products, generally by a commercial printer, a company whose business consists largely of printing products for other companies using its presses. In such a case, the newsprint may be purchased by the printer on behalf of an advertiser or a weekly newspaper publisher, or it may be purchased by the client and then ordered to be shipped to the printer's location.

=== Economic issues ===
The biggest inputs to the newsprint manufacturing process are energy, fiber, and labor. Mill operating margins have been significantly affected in the 2006–2008 time-frame by rising energy costs. Many mills' fiber costs have also been affected during the U.S. housing market slowdown of 2007–8 by the shutdown of many sawmills, particularly in Canada, since the virgin fiber used by mills generally comes from nearby sawmills in the form of wood chips produced as a residual product of the saw milling process.

=== Distribution ===
Another consideration in the newsprint business is delivery, which is affected by energy cost trends. Newsprint around the world may be delivered by rail or truck; or by barge, container or break-bulk shipment if a water delivery is appropriate. (Aside from delivery cost, another consideration in selecting freight mode may be the potential for avoiding damage to the product.) All things being equal, for domestic shipments in areas like North America or Europe where modern road and rail networks are readily available, trucks can be more economical than rail for short-haul deliveries (a day or less from the mill), while rail may be more economical for longer shipments. The cost-competitiveness of each freight mode for a specific mill's business may depend on local infrastructure issues, as well as the degree of truck-vs-freight competition in the mill's region. The appropriate freight mode for delivery from a mill to a specific pressroom can also depend on the press room ability to accept enough trucks or rail cars.

=== Web (width) downsizing ===
A newspaper roll's width is called its web width and is defined by how many front pages it can print. A full roll prints four front pages with four back pages behind it (two front and back on each of the two sections). Modern printing facilities most efficiently print newspapers in multiples of eight pages on a full newsprint roll in two sections of four pages each. The two sections are then cut in half.

Faced with dwindling revenue from competition with broadcast, cable, and internet outlets, U.S. newspapers in the 21st century—particularly broadsheets—have begun to reduce the width of their newsprint rolls, and hence of the newspapers, across the business.

The Boston Globe and USA Today shifted to a 50-inch (130 cm) web in 2000.

The Guardian adopted a smaller "Berliner" format in 2005.

A 48-inch (120 cm) web with 12-inch (30 cm) page widths was adopted by The Wall Street Journal starting on January 2, 2007. The New York Times followed suit on August 6, 2007.

In 2009, The Seattle Times moved from 50-inch (130 cm) web to a 46-inch (120 cm) web, producing an 11 1/2-inch (29 cm) page width.

== Manufacturing ==
Newsprint is generally made by a mechanical milling process, without the chemical processes that are often used to remove lignin from the pulp. The lignin causes the paper to become brittle and yellow when exposed to air or sunlight. Traditionally, newsprint was made from fibers extracted from various softwood species of trees (most commonly, spruce, fir, balsam fir or pine). However, an increasing percentage of the world's newsprint is made with recycled fibers.

== Sustainability ==
There are upper limits on the percentage of the world's newsprint that can be manufactured from recycled fiber. For instance, some of the fiber that enters a recycled pulp mill is lost in pulping, due to inefficiencies inherent in the process. According to the web site of the U.K. chapter of Friends of the Earth, wood fiber can normally only be recycled up to five times due to damage to the fiber. Thus, unless the quantity of newsprint used each year worldwide declines in line with the lost fiber, a certain amount of new (virgin) fiber is required each year globally, even though individual newsprint mills may use 100% recycled fiber. Many mills mix fresh fibers along with recycled fibers to promote sustainability.

== See also ==
- Bleaching of wood pulp
