= Cooperatives of Norway =

Cooperatives of Norway have been created to represent the interest of either customers or suppliers. Areas with cooperatives include retailing, food manufacturing, banking and insurance. Most cooperatives are registered as BA entities.

== Retail ==
Coop NKL is the second largest retail group in Norway, and is owned by numerous local cooperative associations. Coop concentrates mainly on grocery stores, but also has other chains including furniture stores, hardware stores and electronic stores. Nearly two million Norwegians are members of Coop.

Felleskjøpet is an agricultural store that provides everything necessary to operate a farm, including machinery.

== Supplier ==
The fishing and agriculture sectors dominate the supplier cooperatives. Among these are fish sales group and seven specialized food manufacturing companies, the largest being TINE and Nortura. In forestry 85% of all forestry produce is produced by the members and owners of the Norwegian Forest Owners Association, that also owns most of Moelven Industrier and parts of Norske Skog.

== Insurance ==
The mutual insurance company exists today as a number of marine insurance companies (like Gard or Skuld) while other mutual companies have merged into one large insurance company, Gjensidige, which "de-mutualized" in 2010.

== Banking ==
Savings banks, or sparebank, have been created since the 1820s. In the late 1980s these were allowed to create stocks, or grunnfondsbevis, to increase their capital. This has led to a lot of the banks being partially private and no longer cooperatives. Still, many of the smaller bank have remained as true cooperatives. Formally the banks are considered self-owning and not customer owned.
