= Terina (brand) =

Norwegian food brand

- Product type: Frozen food Canned food
- Current owner: Nortura
- Country: Norway
- Related brands: Gilde
- Markets: Norway
- Previous owners: Gilde Norsk Kjøtt; 2006 - Nortura
- Website: http://www.terina.no/

Terina is a brand name used by the Norwegian meat processing company Nortura on its frozen and canned food. The production uses raw products from Gilde but is processed through the subsidiary Terina AS. There are processing plants in Namsos Municipality, Tynset Municipality, Sogndal Municipality and Lillehammer Municipality. Annual production was 17,000 tonnes with a revenue of NOK 1.4 billion and 300 employees in 2005.

Until 2006 the brand was managed by the agricultural cooperative Gilde Norsk Kjøtt who then merged with Prior Norge to form Nortura. The brand was first used in Northern Norway by the local meat cooperatives, and became a national brand in 1964.
