= Norske Skog Skogn =

Pulp and paper mill in Levanger, Norway

Coordinates: 63°42′40″N 11°9′40″E

- Company type: Aksjeselskap
- Industry: Pulp and paper
- Founded: 1 March 1962
- Headquarters: Fiborgtangen, Levanger Municipality, Norway
- Key people: Amund Saxrud (manager)
- Products: Newsprint
- Operating income: 1,768 million kr (2013)
- Net income: NOK −26 million (2013)
- Number of employees: 405 (2014)
- Parent: Norske Skog
- Website: www.norskeskog.com

Norske Skog Skogn AS is a pulp mill and paper mill situated in Levanger Municipality, Norway, which produces newsprint. Situated on the Fiborgtangen peninsula in Skogn, the mill has three paper machines with a total annual capacity of 600,000 tonnes. Pulp is produced both from virgin fibers at an on-site thermomechanical pulp (TMP) mill and from recycled paper at a deinking (DIP) mill. Part of Norske Skog, it is the sole remaining newsprint mill in Norway.

Proposals for a mill came from the Norwegian Forest Owners Association, who wanted a major industrial facility to buy lumber in Central Norway. Originally named Nordenfjelske Treforedling AS, the company was incorporated on 1 March 1962. Forest owner associations held a majority of the shares and the mill was long considered part of the agricultural cooperatives. The first lumber was delivered on 1 March 1966 and the first paper machine, PM1, became operation on 15 September. PM2 started running on 14 November 1967. After buying Van Severen and Ranheim Papirfabrikk, the company took the name Norske Skog in 1972 and gradually expanded beyond their inaugural mill at Skogn.

A TMP mill was installed 1977, but not until a series of upgrades were completed in 1992 could the former grindstone production be scrapped and the need to buy sulfite cellulose could be dropped. PM3 became operational on 23 June 1981. The machines have been through several major upgrades, the most extensive in the late 1980s and early 2000s. A deinking mill became operational in June 2000. Proposals for PM4, which would have produced magazine paper, were abandoned after the plans to build a gas-powered on-site thermal power plant were scrapped by Industrikraft Midt-Norge.

== History ==
=== Planning ===
In the period following the Second World War the wood industry in Trøndelag was outdated and had limited capacity. Forest-owners were forced to sell large portions of their lumber to industries in Eastern Norway. The long distances and hence transport costs cut into the prices, giving the forest-owners reduced revenue. At the time the forest industry was until 1957 organized through a price regulation mechanism, with maximum prices for lumber set by the government. Prices were set through negotiations between forest owner associations, organized by drainage system, and the industry.

The initiative for establishing a major industry for lumber Nordenfjells was therefore both based on the desire for proximity as well as the desire for the forest owners themselves to own the mill. Plans were therefore gradually articulated within the Norwegian Forest Owners Association and its chapters. Various proposals were made, including expanding Folla Bruk, or building new mills either in Namdalen or Helgeland. Formal talks were initiated at a meeting held between the regional forest owners associations on 14 June 1958, initially discussing the possibilities of establishing a mill in Stjørdal Municipality. Central in the initiative was Ivar Aavatsmark and Anders B. Werp. This led to the establishment of the Forest Owners Industrial Committee Nordenfjelds on 8 December. An important preliminary work was the calculation that Central Norway had a chronic overproduction of 300,000 cubic meters (11,000,000 cu ft) of lumber annually, which needed to be allocated to new industry.

Negotiations with the Ministry of Industry and the Ministry of Agriculture commenced in January 1959. One issue which lay in the air was that the government might want to instead establish a government-owned mill, similar to Norsk Jernverk which had recently opened. The ministries gave a preliminary support to the forest owners' proposal, allowing funding for further investigations. This ultimately led to Nordenfjell Commission being established on 19 June 1959. It had three members each from the government, forest owners and the forest industry. The commission was set to consider the mill's location, the amount of lumber it needed, processing techniques as well and financing and ownership issues. A pulp mill was considered, based on recently abandoned proposals for one in Kirkenes, a site found to be too remote. The commission recommended unanimously on 27 January 1961 that the mill be organized as a cooperative, that it receive one paper machine with an annual output of 100,000 tonnes, a mechanical pulp mill with an annual production of 80,000 tonnes and 20,000 tonnes of pulp produced through the sulfite process.

Representatives for the forest owners traveled in February 1961 to Finland to inspect cooperative mills there. The Norwegian Forest Owners Association approved the plans on 20 March. The main opposition to the mill came from the other forest industry companies in the country. Follum Fabrikker proposed that they could build a new mill in Trøndelag, and offered to allow forest owners and the government receive a third of the ownership each.

Instead of organizing the company as a cooperative proper, the new company was to be an aksjeselskap where the various forest owner associations would purchase a majority stake. The reason for avoiding a cooperative proper was that it would have difficulties raising the necessary capital. The forest-owner domination was retained based on the experience from the purchase of Borregaard in 1919, where the direct ownership of forest owners had been gradually diluted and had ultimately lost control. The central and southern associations had sufficient capital to simply pay out, while forest-owners Nordensfjells were charged a six-percent fee on all lumber for five years to secure sufficient equity.

The shares were offered for sale on 30 October 1961, with a total value of NOK 49 million. The forest owner associations purchased shares for NOK 28 million. This consisted of NOK 12 million by the southern associations, NOK 11 million by the northern associations, and NOK 5 million by the central organization. NOK 10 million of the shares were offered on the open market, with individual forest-owners encouraged to buy shares. NOK 5 million was bought by various agricultural cooperatives and the same amount by Nord-Trøndelag County Municipality. The remaining NOK 7 million State-owned Land and Forest Company. Securing the remaining NOK 125 million through loans proved to be more difficult. The District Development Fund issued a NOK 50-million loan, while the rest was eventually split between Vesta and Hambros Bank.

=== Construction ===
Nordenfjelske Treforedling A/S was incorporated on 1 March 1962, initially registered in Trondheim. The annual meeting elected Reidar Due as the board's chairman. One of the issues the company had to address was the location of the mill. Sites were considered in Namsos, Steinkjer, Verdal, Skogn, Stjørdal and Orkdal. The government pressed for it to be located near Namsos, but on 5 December the board chose unanimously to locate it at Fiborgtangen in Skogn. The peninsula had bedrock, which was needed to support the up to 3000-tonne paper machines, and there was sufficient space for five machines. There was also a shallow bay which could be filled in to store lumber. There was ample access for fresh water. The site was located next to the Nordland Line, European Road E6 and was on the ice-free part of the Trondheimsfjord, allowing for good transport. In addition to being located centrally in the forest-rich Trøndelag, it was near routes to the Swedish forests in Jämtland.

Initially the plans had called for a single paper machine with an annual production capacity of 100,000 cubic meters (3,500,000 cu ft). In the midst of construction the issue of building a second machine was raised. There was an overproduction of chemical pulp and this could be bought cheaply and easily. An additional 150,000 cubic meters (5,300,000 cu ft) of pulpwood would be needed; this could be secured from Jämtland. There was a certain political opposition, especially in the Conservative Party, with concerns that it would lead to an overdemand for lumber. The second machine, PM2, received political approval, and was approved by the annual meeting on 10 April 1964. The extra NOK 75 in funding was secured through issuing additional shares, bringing the share equity to NOK 64 million. The rest was borrowed.

The company contracted Jaakko Pöyry to design the mill. Fifteen homes had to be abandoned to build the mill, which took over an area of 40 hectares (99 acres). This included 18 hectares (44 acres) of agricultural land. Fiborgtangen was leveled by removing 180,000 cubic meters (6,400,000 cu ft) of earthwork in addition to 120,000 cubic meters (4,200,000 cu ft) bedrock which was blasted. This included the 4 hectares (9.9 acres) island of Valøya. The lumber harbor was dredged of 200,000 cubic meters (7,100,000 cu ft) of earthwork, while on the opposite side of the site a 235-meter (771 ft) port was built. The leveling was completed in mid 1964, after which work on the actual mill building started. Total building area measured 31,107 square meters (334,830 sq ft), of which the paper machine halls filled 15,000 square meters (160,000 sq ft) in a hall measuring 240 by 58 meters (787 by 190 ft). The first ship, with steel to the oil tanks, docked on 2 September 1965.

Delivery of the first parts of the paper machine, manufactured by Valmet, took place in late December. Water was provided by Levanger Municipality from the lake of Hoklingen. Supply was provided through 3.8 kilometers (2.4 mi) of tunnels and 4.2 kilometers (2.6 mi) of pipes. By agreement the mill could use 3 cubic meters (110 cu ft) of water each second. A branch road was built from the E6 and a branch railway line was built from Skogn Station. An agreement secured 300 gigawatthours per year of electricity from Nord-Trøndelag Elektrisitetsverk. Construction cost NOK 31 million, making it at the time the most expensive privately funding industrial complex in Norway.

The first lumber was delivered to the mill on 1 March 1966, months before the mill was completed. The company used the time to establish a buffer of lumber. The company started courses opened to all interested to attract potential workers. PM1 was started on 15 September at 23:00. PM2 started operations on 14 November 1967. By then the company had a staff of 417 employees. In their original configuration the two paper machines had a production of 430 meters (1,410 ft) per minute. Most of the lumber came from an effectivization program carried out in the woods, through construction of more roads and increased mechanization, allow the workload per cubic meter of wood to drop to a fifth during the 1960s. This allowed more marginal areas to be logged.

The village of Skogn had previously been concentrated around Skogn Station. The opening of the mill caused the area to experience rapid expansion. Two new subdivisions were built around the village – Holåsen for engineers and functionaries and Holsandlia for foremen. The increased population was key to the development of Skogn reaching a population of 2,400 and has helped develop the village and its services.

=== Early operation ===
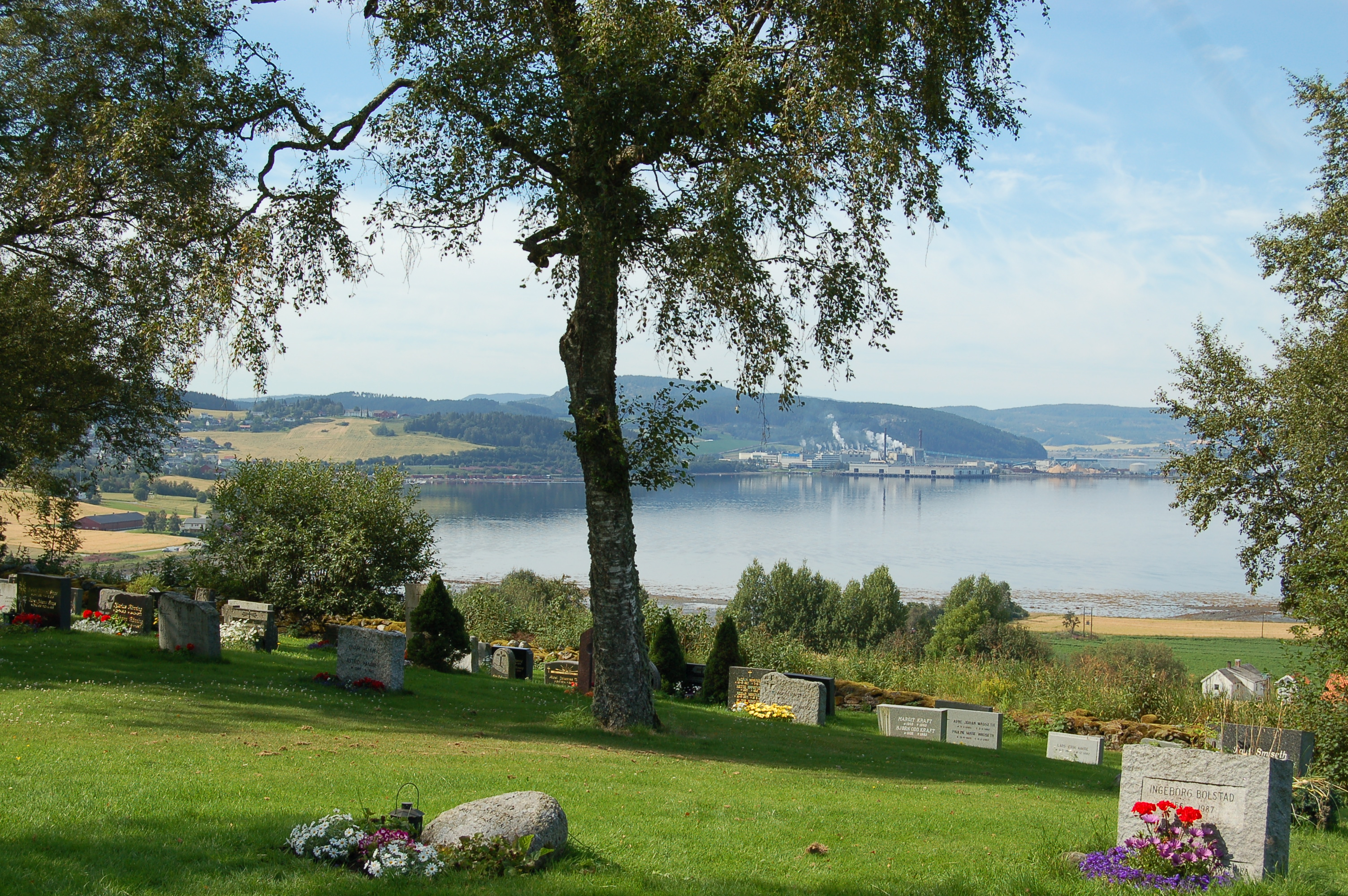
The mill seen in the background in an overview of Skogn as seen from Alstadhaug Church

Only ten percent of the newsprint production could be sold domestically. The main Norwegian competitors, Union Co. and Follum, had joined forces with Swedish and Finnish counterparts to form the newsprint sales organization Scannews. Nordenfjelske was barred for entering the cartel and instead chose to ally with Borregaard. They formed the joint venture Borregaard & Nordenfjelske on 1 October 1964, in anticipation for Borregaard to start their own newsprint mill. This continued onwards even after Borregaard shelved their newsprint plans.

Contracts were predominantly signed for one year at a time. Sixty-one percent of the production the first year was exported to Western Europe, while thirty percent was shipped intercontinentally. The company gradually established a series of sales offices and contracted agents globally. The organization varied somewhat. In for instance Germany and the United Kingdom subsidiaries were eventually established. In the Netherlands and Belgium this was conducted through joint ventures.

Nordenfjelske branded its newsprint as Nornews and adapted the slogan "Nornews is good news". The standard newsprint was at the time 52 g/m^{2}. Nordenfjelske also produced a lighter 45 g/m^{2} intended for newspapers and 40 g/m^{2} for directories. Shortly afterwards improved quality newsprint was launched under the Norfi brand, and Norweb was produced optimized for offset printing.

The 1960s represented a period with record-high growth rates in paper consumption. The company made a profit of NOK 19.4 million during its first year of production. However, the increased consumption was initially met also with increased production, through several new paper machines in Europe. From 1968 demand exceeded production, resulting in high margins. The mill made a NOK 30-million profit in 1968, rising to NOK 47 million two years later. The company was listed on Oslo Stock Exchange's list of non-listed companies on 1 July 1969, followed by a main listing on Trondheim Stock Exchange from 2 January 1970.

Meanwhile, Nordenfjelske started looking at the supply of sulfate pulp, of which it needed an annual supply of 40,000 tonnes. Proposals called for a sulfate pulp mill at Fiborgtangen, but this was met by opposition locally due to the concerns of the smell. Ranheim Papirfabrik in Trondheim was at the time considering building a new pulp mill at Ranheim and proposed that it increase the output to 140,000 tonnes annually in order to also supply Fiborgtangen.

This resulted in Nordenfjelske entering negotiations with Ranheim in 1969 about mering the two companies. A primary concern was to concentrate the purchasing of lumber in Central Norway. This caused Nordenfjelske to also start negotiating an acquisition with Van Severen, the largest sawmill in the region, situated in Namsos. Although there was a slight opposition from the authorities, 97 percent of Van Severen was bought in late 1970, followed by a take-over of Ranheim on 1 July 1971. A Swedish subsidiary was established on 1 May 1970 with responsibility for procuring pulpwood from Sweden. Within a few years imports reached 500,000 cubic meters (18,000,000 cu ft). The acquisitions resulted in Nordenfjelske becoming a concern, where the factor at Fiborgtangen merely was the largest mill. The group took the name Norske Skogindustrier ("Norwegian Forest Industries") and started trading as Norske Skog on 28 April 1972. The mill at Fiborgtangen was oftentimes referred to as Nordenfjelske.

=== TMP and PM3 ===
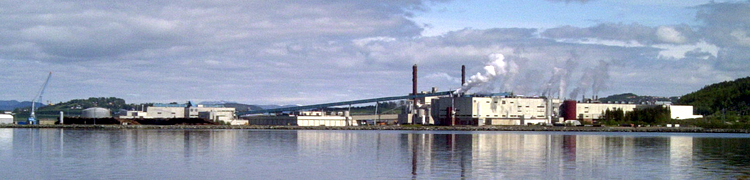

The early 1970s saw the transformation to more automated processes. The accounting systems were transferred to computers in 1970, followed by the paper machines in 1972 and 1973. These systems automatically measured the water content of the pulp at various stages and then adjusted the input factors as needed. PM1 was renovated and upgraded in a two-month period in 1975. This followed the standardization of newsprint to 48.8 g/m^{2} as well as optimized the paper for offset printing. This and other refinements allowed the speed of the paper machine to increase to 900 meters per minute, up from 430 at start-up.

The next step was introduction of a new pulp process, thermomechanical pulp (TMP), replacing the former grindstone mechanical pulping. TMP allowed for more long fibers to be retained, thus improving the strength. This allowed for cellulose content to be dropped from fifteen percent, which would allow for cost-savings along with faster processing through the paper machines. The first TMP machine was installed in 1977, with a daily capacity of 120 tonnes.

Because the TMPs were a closed system, it allowed for recycling of heat, which cut oil considerably. A thermocompression system was installed between 1980 and 1982, allowing the oil consumption use for the entire mill to be cut by between a third and a fourth.

The 1973–75 recession hit the demand for newsprint hard, and from 1973 to 1978 the mill experienced low prices, high inflation, increasing energy and lumber prices combined with a stagnation of newsprint prices. Meanwhile, the company was working on establishing a third paper machine, PM3. Formal work commenced in 1972 and the corporate assembly approved the plans on 5 December 1977, giving the board freedom to proceed as was deemed favorable.

Several of the small pulp mills in Norway were struggling through the 1970s. Exports were decimated with the bankruptcy of key British paper mills were combined with small-scale and thus high-cost production. Meanwhile, new environmental restriction required all-new plants. Pulp mills were therefore being closed throughout the country. Several politicians proposed that a new paper machine should be located elsewhere, and locations such as Namsos and Lauvsnes were mentioned as sites, as these had recently lost pulp mills. Norske Skog retained that without placing PM3 at Fiborgtangen the project would lose its profitability.

PM3 cost NOK 700 million, financed through a combination of new share issues, loans and export credits. The work included expanding the TMP from 100 to 600 tonnes per day, and a new thermal power plant for bark. PM3 became operational on 23 June 1981. The machine would require a further 300,000 cubic meters (11,000,000 cu ft) of lumber and produce 140,000 tonnes of newsprint, bringing the mill's total annual production to 380,000 tonnes. However, the opening coincided with a decline in newsprint demand, resulting in the machines running at reduced capacity. To supply its cellulose, Norske Skog teamed up with other Norwegian paper mills and established Tofte Industrier in Hurum Municipality.

=== Consolidation ===
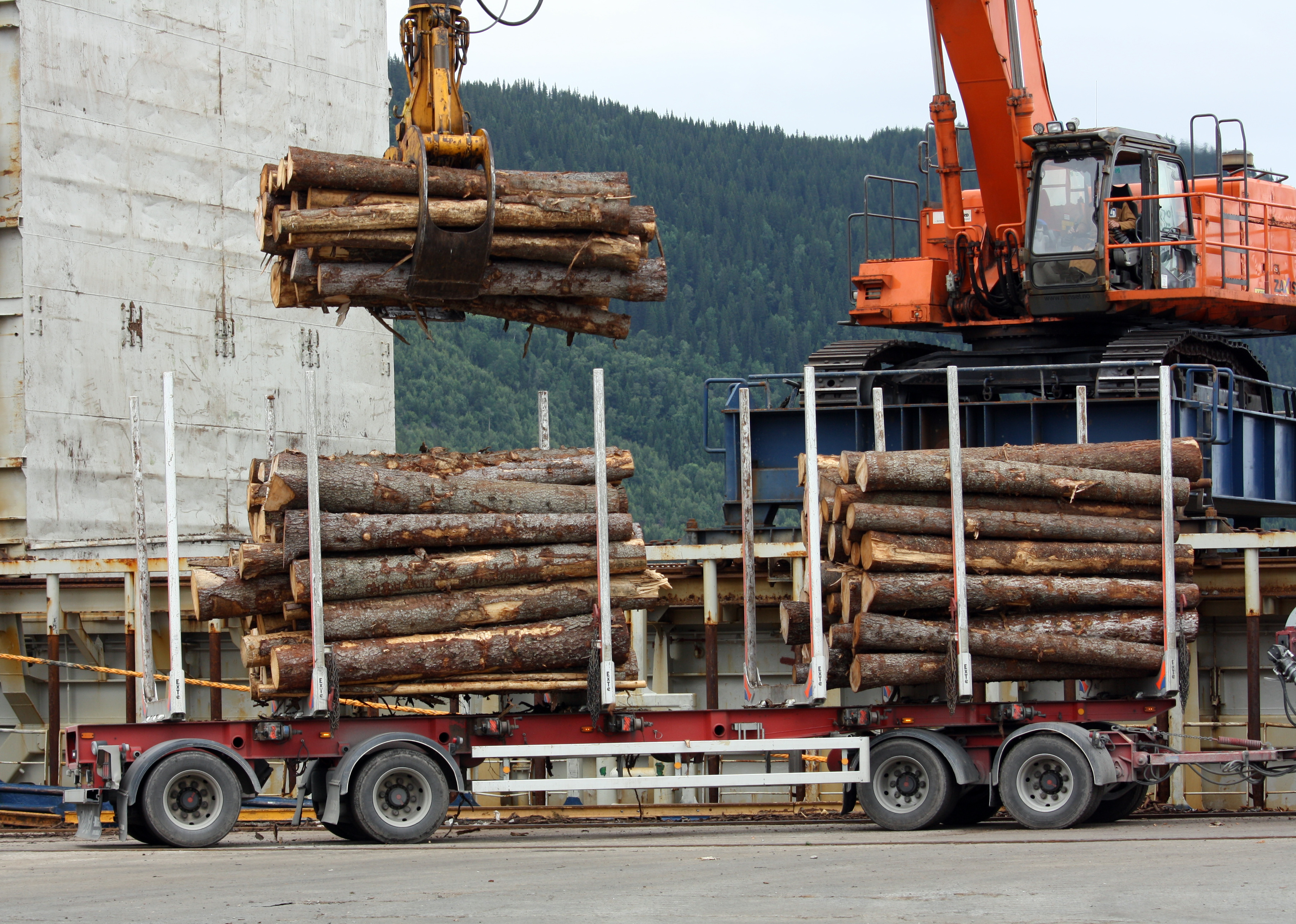
Transshipment of lumber in Orkanger heading for Fiborgtangen

Fiborgtangen had about 700 employees during the 1980s. From 1984 and the following years there was an increase in newsprint demand. Customers demanded better quality paper, particularly aimed at more advanced offset printing and color printing. To remain competitive Norske Skog needed both to improve quality and cut production costs. This was achieved through the rationalization program NT90, which ran from 1986 through 1991. Total costs reached NOK 2 billion. A quarter of this was financed through issuing new shares.

PM1 and PM2 were rebuilt, while PM3 received an overhaul and minor upgrades. The TMPs were also upgraded, allowing the original mechanical pulp mill from the 1960s to be shut down. By 1992 Fiborgtangen received ninety-eight percent of its fibers from TMP, cutting the use of cellulose to two percent. A new debarking plant was installed, allowing logs to be debarked in full length. The lumber harbor was filled in and lumber storage was moved to land, where they were more easily accessible. Wood choppings were stored heaps, easing access. The paper storage and docks were expanded, and a new wing was added to the office building. NT90 allowed total production to increase from 400,000 to 500,000 tonnes annually.

Norske Skog merged with Follum and Tofte on 13 October 1989, with the newly merged company retaining the Norske Skog name and brand. The corporation's head office remained at Fiborgtangen. Newsprint prices fell dramatically during the early 1990s, so that the company went with a loss despite the cost cuts.

Paper recycling became common abroad during the 1980s and subsequently the Ministry of the Environment initiated proceedings to secure a source for domestic paper reuse. This led to an agreement in 1992 between Norske Skog and the ministry, in which the company obliged themselves to build a recycling plant for 100,000 tonnes, in exchange for access to the scrap paper. There was an internal consideration of which mill to build the recycling plant at, and ultimately Skogn was preferred over Follum in a board decision made in August 1993. Skogn was selected because it created mostly standard newsprint and exported to the European market which demanded high deinked pulp (DIP) content.

The initial agreement called for the deinking plant to be completed by 1996. However, concerns regarding increased investment costs and price fluctuation kept postponing the investment decision. The board approved the plans in February 1998 and construction began in early 1999. By then the scale had increased and the capacity increased to 170,000 tonnes. Operations began in June 2000.

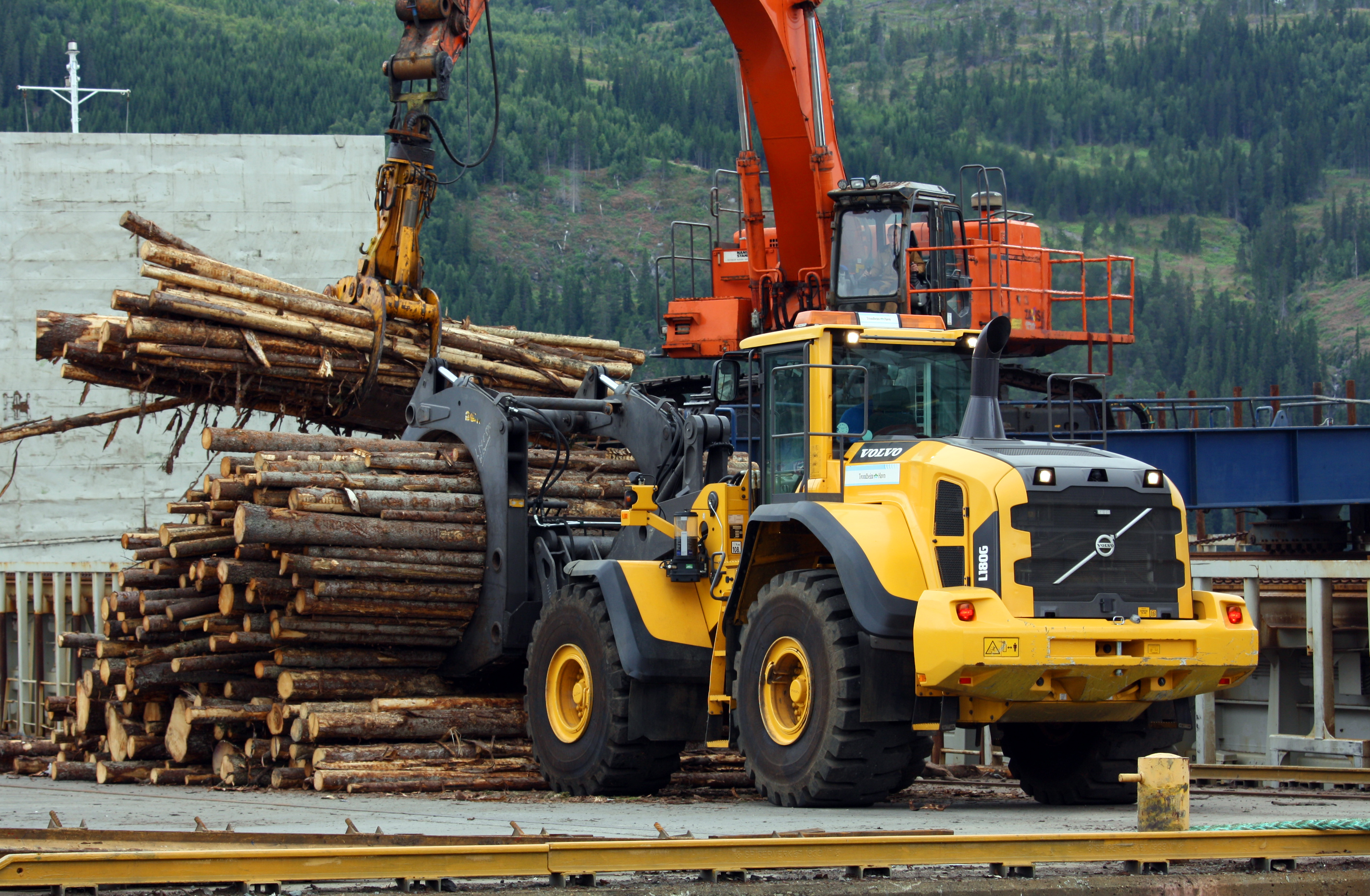
Transshipment of lumber in Orkanger heading for Fiborgtangen

With the deregulation of the electricity market in the 1990s, Norske Skog was concerned regarding its purchasing price of power. An agreement was struck in 1998 with Statkraft to purchase necessary power to an agreed-upon price until 2020. The company also started working on plans for a thermal power station at Fiborgtangen, which could be fired by natural gas from the Heidrun Oil Field. This would be supplied through a proposed gas pipeline from Tjeldbergodden. Norske Skog allied with Elkem and Statoil to create Industrikraft Midt-Norge. Permission was granted in 2001 for a plant with an annual output of 6.4 terawatt-hours. However, high gas prices compared to electricity prices meant that the power station was never economically viable and was never built.

Parallel these plans, Norske Skog considered the possibility of building a fourth paper machine at Fiborgtangen. PM4 was planned to produce magazine paper, but was dependent on the thermal power station to receive sufficient power. Between the two investments were stipulated to between NOK 7 and 8 billion. The investments were placed on hold of several factors. One was a general decline in the demand for paper, and general increasing costs in Norway, making Noske Skog prefer investments in their foreign mills. Another reason was that Norske Skog spent most of its capital purchasing foreign mills in an attempt to become a dominant worldwide manufacturer of newsprint and magazine paper.

The company also worked on plans to build a container port at Fiborgtangen. In addition to serving the company's own needs, it hoped to establish a transshipment facility which would allow the port to serve all of Trøndelag, as well as transit freight from Norrland in Sweden.

Newsprint prices dropped in 2003, and the mill presented a profit of NOK 201 million—the worst in twenty years. The company took advantage to take the paper machines out of production to allow them to be maintained, upgraded and the speed increased. The mill also cuts its staff from 610 to 515. Fiborgtangen produced 519,000 tonnes in 2003. The ensuing decade saw a gradual reduction in the demand for newsprint. Further rationalizations were carried out, reducing the number of employees to 370 by 2014. Norske Skog decided to consolidate its newsprint production in Norway to Skogn, closing down Norske Skog Unionin March 2006 and Norske Skog Follum in March 2012.

After having used Lys Line and DFDS Tor Line, later DFDS Logistics, as their shipping partner since 2003, a new tender shifted the operator to Sea-Cargo. PM1 was in 2013 switched to an improved newsprint, typically used for supplements and which allowed for better prices. The following year Norske Skog established an industrial park at Fiborgtangen, attracting several smaller companies to establish themselves on the premises.

== Operations ==
Norske Skog Skogn AS is organized as an aksjeselskap and a wholly owned subsidiary of Norske Skogsindustrier. Within the concern it is a separate business unit and one of two mills in Norway, the other being Norske Skog Saugbrugs in Halden Municipality. It is the sole producer of newsprint in Norway. The company had a revenue of NOK 1,768 million in 2013, running with an operational deficit of NOK 26 million. It has 405 employees.

The plant features two sources of pulp – a thermomechanical pulp mill and a deinkling mill. These feed three paper machines, all which produce newsprint. Operations run around the clock, where the process and supervisory workers work in five shifts.

=== Production ===
The plan has two value chains to produce pulp. The first is thermomechanical process, which is fed chippings directly from external sources, as well as on-side chopping of lumber. The bark from the lumber is extracted and used in as on-site heating. The second source of pulp is from recycled paper, sourced both domestically and through import. The recycled paper goes through a deinking process before becoming usable deinkled pulp (DIP). A small portion of calcium carbonate is added to the pulp before processing.

The mill has three paper machines, all which produce newsprint. PM1 is also able to produce improved newsprint. All three use mix of virgin and recycled fibers, with PM3 utilizing 45 percent DIP, while the other two run at 20 percent. Total annual capacity is 600,000 tonnes. Production was at 451,000 tonnes in 2014.

The following is a list of the three paper machines and their production variables – the newsprint's trimmed width, the paper type, the annual production capacity in tonnes, and the deinked pulp (DIP) content in percent.

Paper machines
Machine	Width	Paper	Capacity	DIP
PM1	667 cm (263 in)	[Improved] newsprint	172,000 t	20%
PM2	670 cm (260 in)	Newsprint	186,000 t	20%
PM3	847 cm (333 in)	Newsprint	242,000 t	45%

The mill consumed 1,079 GWh of electric power in 2014 and 255,770,000 cubic meters (9.032×10^{9} cu ft) of water. All heating is produced through biofuels or recycling from the TMP mills. The main bio sources are bark from lumber and recycled slam from the decontamination processes from process water. The mill uses 405 GWh annually of recycled heat and 348 GWh from bioheat.

=== Logistics ===
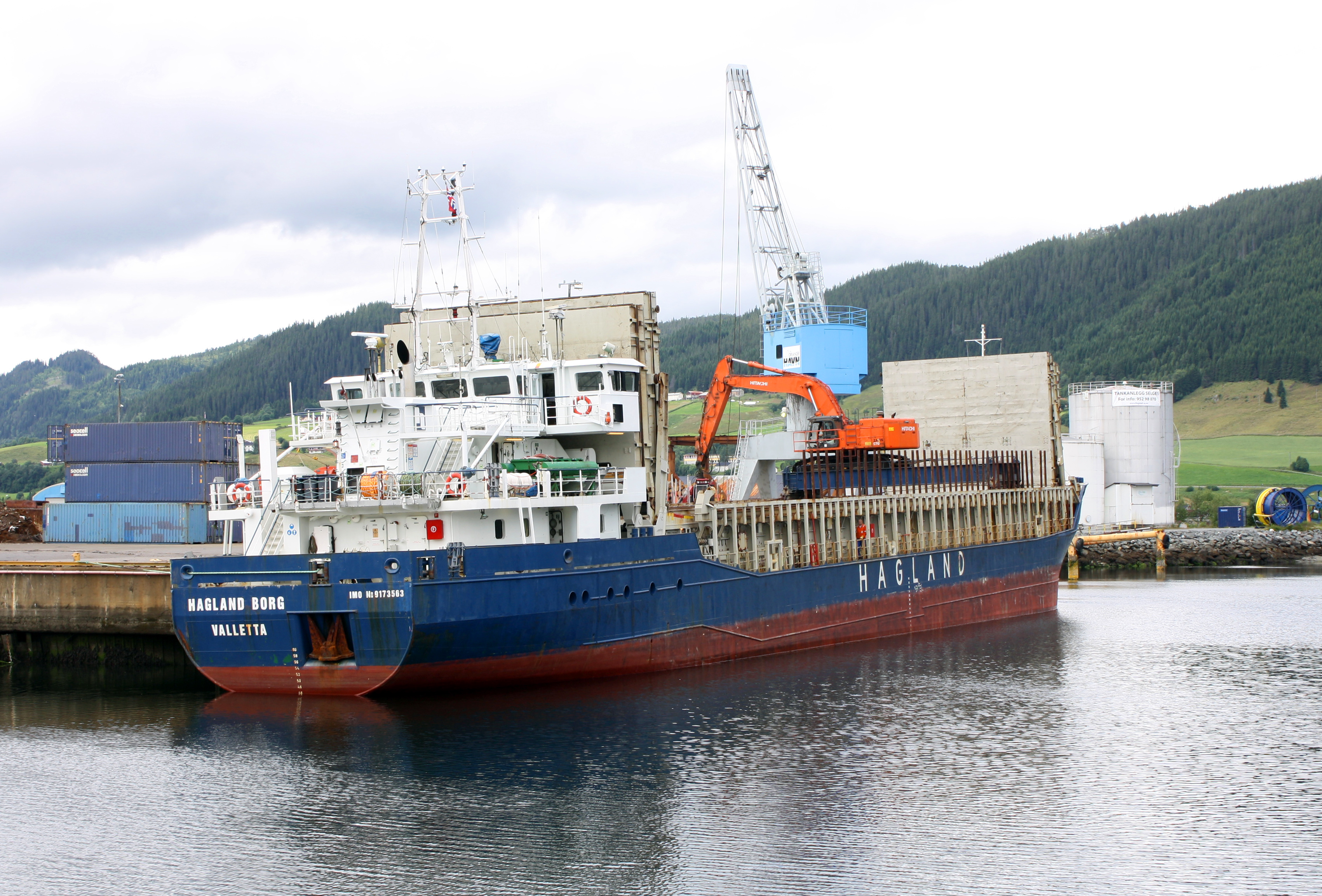
Hagland Borg loading lumber in Orkanger for transport to Fiborgtangen

The plant used 567,000 cubic meters (20,000,000 cu ft) of pine, 185,000 cubic meters (6,500,000 cu ft) of wood chippings, 160,000 tonnes of recycled paper and 31,000 tonnes of fillings as its fiber sources in 2014. About 100,000 cubic meters (3,500,000 cu ft) of this arrives by train, the rest a mix of trucks and by sea.

Import of recycled paper and export of newsprint have been subcontracted to Sea-Cargo. This is carried out through three purpose-built sidedoor vessels. Between them they operate routes to Clydeport, Belfast, Sheerness, Amsterdam, Hamburg and Kolding. Lysblink has a deadweight tonnage of 7,500 tonnes, and has a deck area of 4,070 square meters (43,800 sq ft). MV Trans Dania has a deadweight tonnage of 5,353 tonnes, and has a deck area of 1,880 square meters (20,200 sq ft). MV Nordic has a deadweight tonnage of 4,968 tonnes, and has a deck area of 1,756 square meters (18,900 sq ft). Sea voyages depart twice weekly out of the on-facility port.

Lumber is hauled by train from Formofoss Lumber Terminal in Grong Municipality twice per week, one weekly train arrives from Jämtland via the Meråker Line, and there is a weekly train from Koppang Lumber Terminal on the Røros Line. The mill has a branch line from the Nordland Line just south of Skogn Station, branching off at 75.44 kilometers (46.88 mi) from Trondheim Central Station. The branch is 2.8 kilometers (1.7 mi) long and runs through a loop at Fiborgtangen. There is a 335 meters (1,099 ft) tunnel on the branch.

== Bibliography ==
- Bjerke, Thor; Holom, Finn (2004). Banedata 2004 (in Norwegian). Hamar / Oslo: Norwegian Railway Museum / Norwegian Railway Club. ISBN 82-90286-28-7.
- Dybevik, Carsten; Langfjæran, Jarle (2012). "Norske Skog 50" (PDF). Norske Skog.
- Pollen, Geir (2007). Langt fra stammen (in Norwegian). Oslo: Gyldendal Norsk Forlag. ISBN 978-82-05-34625-3.
