= Alfathi =

Brand name used on halal meat

- Current owner: Nortura
- Country: Norway
- Related brands: Gilde
- Markets: Norway
- Previous owners: 2001 - Gilde Norsk Kjøtt; 2006 - Nortura
- Website: http://www.alfathi.no/

Alfathi (lit. New Possibilities) is a brand name used by Nortura on its halal meat distributed in Norway. The meat is approved by the Islamic Council Norway. There has traditionally been a disharmony between the Norwegian food traditions and availability of halal meat, the latter often only being provided for Middle Eastern cuisine. Alfathi was created by Gilde Norsk Kjøtt in 2001 to produce typical Norwegian foods which could meet the strict slaughter restrictions within Islam. Among the products available are pizza, hamburger, meat slices and wieners. Products are of course not made from prohibited species, such as pigs and carnivores.

The halal slaughter procedure used by Nortura meets all requirements both set by the Qur'an and the Norwegian Food Safety Authority. This includes such requirements as that the slaughterer must be a Muslim, that the animal's head must face the Qibla, and the animal is blessed at the time of slaughter. Norwegian law requires that the animal is stunned before slaughter. This does not break halal rules, but is not the traditional method used by Muslims. The time between the stunning of the animal and the slaughter is about 20 seconds. The killing of the animal is done by cutting the two main arteries in the neck and immediately draining the animal of blood. After slaughter, the halal meat has a separate value chain until distribution.

== Controversy ==
In July 2007 a number of Islamic groups encouraged a boycott of the chicken halal brands in Norway, since about 10% of chickens died after stunning but without being bled. The halal rules state that the animal must be alive when its throat is cut to be slaughtered properly, so animals that died when stunned are not halal.
