= Ringhals =

Ringhals may refer to:

- Rinkhals, a venomous species of snake with the ability to spit venom.
- Ringhals Nuclear Power Plant, a Swedish nuclear power plant.
