= EHZ =

EHZ or EHz may refer to:

== EHz ==
- Exahertz, a unit of hertz

== EHZ ==
- EHZ Festival, a 2012 festival in Hélette, France, performed at by Miyavi
- Short name for European Halal Certification Institute, a body performing halal certification in Europe
