= Agricultural cooperatives in Norway =

The agricultural cooperatives in Norway (Norwegian: Landbrukssamvirket) consists of 13 companies, each organised as independent farmer owned cooperatives. They cover four different areas for the farmers: refining and sale of produce, financial services, breeding and insemination, and retail of agricultural equipment. All the cooperatives cooperate through the company Norsk Landbrukssamvirke. In total the companies have a revenue of NOK 58 billion and have 18,000 employees. TINE and Nortura are responsible for about a quarter of the revenue each. Though none of the cooperatives hold any monopolies, their dominant position periodical causes debate about the structure of the agricultural processing industry.

== Companies ==
- Landkreditt (mortgages)
- Gjensidige (insurance, not solely agricultural)
- Felleskjøpet (farming equipment retailer)
- GENO (breeding and insemination of cattle)
- Norsk Kjøttfeavlslag (breeding of cattle)
- Norsvin (breeding and insemination pigs)
- Norsk Sau og Geit (breeding and insemination of sheep and goats)
- TINE (dairy)
  - Diplom-Is (ice cream)
- Nortura (slaughterhouses)
  - Gilde (red meat)
  - Prior (white meat and eggs)
- Norges Skogeierforbund (lumber trade)
- Gartnerhallen (fruit, berries and vegetable trade)
- Honningcentralen (honey trade)
- HOFF SA (potato products)
- Norges Pelsdyralslag (skins and fur)

== See also ==
- Agricultural cooperative
- Cooperatives of Norway
