= SCHOKINAG-Schokolade-Industrie =

German chocolate manufacturer

SCHOKINAG-Schokolade-Industrie GmbH
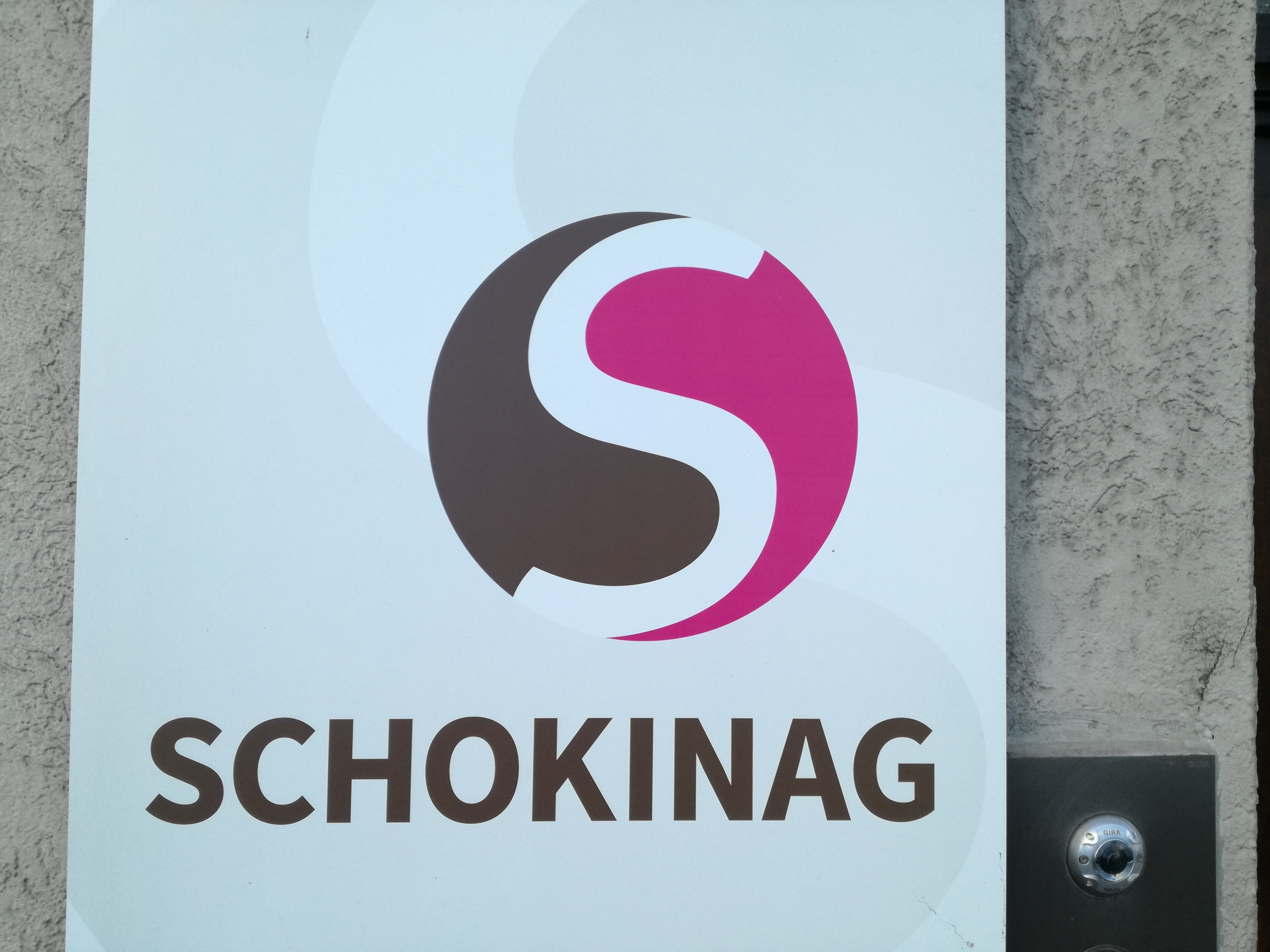
- Industry: Foods
- Founded: 1923
- Headquarters: Mannheim, Germany
- Number of employees: 150 (2018)
- Website: www.schokinag.com

SCHOKINAG-Schokolade-Industrie GmbH (SCHOKINAG) is a food company based in Mannheim. It is considered to be one of the leading chocolate manufacturers in Europe. Founded in 1923 as a family business, SCHOKINAG has been under the ownership of the Malaysian company Guan Chong Berhad (GCB) since 2020.

The company processes cocoa beans, cocoa butter and cocoa mass and produces both liquid and solid chocolates and couvertures. The products are not supplied to end users, but exclusively to wholesalers and to other food companies for further processing.

== History ==
SCHOKINAG was founded in 1923 as a family business under the name SCHOKINAG-Schokolade-Industrie and has since been producing chocolates for the processing industry.

After the destruction experienced during World War II, the company was rebuilt in 1945.

The first delivery of liquid chocolate took place in 1959.

In 1978, the grandchild Hans-Joachim Herrmann took over the management of the company.

Big investments in the years 1990, 1993 and 2000 supported the growth of the company.

In 1991 SCHOKINAG North America was founded, followed by the establishment of SCHOKINAG UK in 1997 and of SCHOKINAG Chocolate Belgium in 2006.

In 2009, the company was acquired by the American food corporation Archer Daniels Midland (ADM). In 2015, ADM sold Schokinag's chocolate production to US Cargill, while the cocoa division first remained under the ownership of ADM.

In 2016, SCHOKINAG was acquired by two Dutch financial investors.

In 2019, SCHOKINAG became a member of the German Initiative on Sustainable Cocoa (Forum Nachhaltiger Kakao).

In 2020 the company Guan Chong Berhad (GCB) took over SCHOKINAG.

== Products ==
SCHOKINAG produces dark, milk and white chocolates and chocolate couvertures, in liquid form (for topping, ice cream applications etc.) and solid form (chips for remelting, baking and decorating and chunks for use in the baking industry). Further production items include decorations such as curls and shavings. The company works with both standard and tailor-made recipes. SCHOKINAG's current annual production capacity lies between 80.000 und 90.000 t. The company mainly supplies clients throughout the European Union.

== Certifications ==
SCHOKINAG is IFS Food, ISO 50001, ISO 27001:2022, RSPO, Sedex, Kosher Dairy and HALAL certified. The company also offers products made with Fairtrade certified cocoa (Mass Balance) and Rainforest Alliance Certified cocoa (Segregated).
