= Fiborgtangen =

Industrial area in Levanger, Norway

Coordinates: 63.7153°N 11.1527°E

Fiborgtangen is a peninsula and industrial site located along Trondheimsfjord in the northwest part of the village of Skogn in Levanger Municipality in Trøndelag county, Norway. The 500-decare (0.50 km^{2}; 0.19 sq mi) site hosts the paper mill Norske Skog Skogn and the associated port used to ship newsprint away from the plant. Fiborgtangen is also the site chosen by Industrikraft Midt-Norge to build a thermal power plant powered by natural gas.

The site is accessible via a side track from the Nordland Line and from European route E6, which both run past the site.

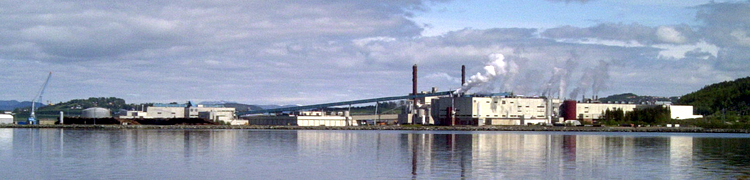
View of Fiborgtangen from the fjord
