= Norwegian Forest Owners Association =

Norwegian forestry cooperative

- Company type: Cooperative
- Industry: Forestry
- Founded: 1913
- Headquarters: Oslo, Norway
- Area served: Norway
- Key people: Olav Breivik (Chairman); Erik Lahnstein (managing director)
- Website: www.skog.no

Norwegian Forest Owners Association (Norwegian: Norges Skogeierforbund) is an association representing 43,000 owners of forest in Norway. The main functions of the organisation is to assist the members, who are mostly farmers, to manage their forest. This includes forestry plans, part of the cutting of timer and negotiating agreements with lumber mills and paper mills. The association is one of the 13 agricultural cooperatives in Norway and based in Oslo with 366 local groups and eight district organisations, organised as BAs. In 2005 83% of all domestic timber was organised through the association.

The eight regional organisations are Havass Skog, Glommen Skog, Mjøsen Skog, Viken Skog, AT Skog, Vestskog, Sogn og Fjordane Skogeigarlag and ALLSKOG. Both the regional and central associations hold major ownerships of Norske Skog and Moelven Industrier. The associations are members of the Confederation of Norwegian Enterprise (NHO).

== History ==
The first forest owner association was founded along Glomma in 1903, soon to be followed by others. Because of the nature of logging, the associations were organised by river instead of by county. The national association was founded in 1913 as a union between the regional associations. The first mayor task was to buy the Borregaard corporation based around Glomma from the British Kellner-Partington company, that was finalised in 1917. In 1962 the association founded Nordenfjelske Treforedling that opened the Norske Skog Skogn plant in 1966. Norske Skogindustrier was founded in 1972 as a massive merger between various companies throughout the country. The association still owns about 20% of the corporation, that has become the world's largest producer of newsprint. Ivar Aavatsmark served as Director of the association for 40 years, between 1942 and 1982.
