= Halal certification in India =

Islamic product certification in India

In India, halal certification indicates that a food product complies with Islamic dietary laws. It is neither mandatory nor regulated by a unified national framework.

Halal certification was first introduced in India in 1974, initially restricted to meat products. By 1993, its scope had expanded to encompass a wider range of goods, as businesses began to recognise the market potential among Muslim consumers. Prominent Indian corporations, including Reliance Industries, the Tata Group, and Adani Group, have since obtained halal certification for various products.

== Certification bodies ==
In India, halal certification is primarily managed by non-governmental organisations (NGOs), rather than by governmental authorities. Notable certifying bodies such as Jamiat Ulema-e-Hind issue halal certificates and typically charge businesses for both the initial certification and periodic renewals. However, certain manufacturers and vendors label their products as halal in an effort to appeal to Muslim consumers, despite not obtaining certification from recognised authorities.

== Economic impact ==
In India, halal certification serves as an assurance that a food product has been prepared in accordance with Islamic dietary laws. However, the country neither mandates such certification nor maintains a unified regulatory framework governing its implementation.

Halal certification in India was formally introduced in 1974, initially limited to the regulation and certification of meat products in accordance with Islamic dietary laws. The certification was expanded to other products in 1993. It gradually gained recognition within the Indian commercial landscape, particularly in response to the growing demand among the country's substantial Muslim population.

A multi-billion dollar market, many corporations and conglomerates in India, such as Reliance Industries, Tata Group, Adani Group, have obtained halal certifications. Furthermore, in 2022, India's halal meat exports were valued at over $4.4 billion.

== Reception and government actions ==
The expansion of halal certification beyond meat products has sparked debates on both economic and ethical grounds. The certification has regularly been opposed by Hindutva political organisations and leaders. Critics, particularly from political parties such as the Bharatiya Janata Party (BJP), have called for a ban on halal products across India, citing concerns over the certification's impact on non-Muslim consumers and its potential misuse for commercial or political purposes.

On December 28, 2020, a hindu nationalist organisation named Hindu Aikya Vedi issued a notice to a bakery, asking it to not advertise or stock halal food brands. The Mody bakery removed the tag after receiving the notice.

On November 17, 2023, a case was registered in Lucknow against some entities for allegedly exploiting religious sentiments to boost sales by providing halal certificates to customers of a specific religion. Entities mentioned in the case included Halal India, Jamiat Ulema-i-Hind Halal Trust, Halal Council of India, and Jamiat Ulema Maharashtra. The Uttar Pradesh Food Safety and Drug Administration has since launched a crackdown on halal-certified products across all 75 districts of the state.

== See also ==
- Halal certification in Australia
- Halal certification in Europe
- Halal certification in the Philippines
