= Allskog =

Norwegian forestry organization

Allskog BA is the regional branch of the Norwegian Forest Owners Association in Central and Northern Norway, including the counties Møre og Romsdal, Sør-Trøndelag, Nord-Trøndelag, Nordland, Troms. Its 9,000 members are organized through 100 chapters. Allskog is based in Trondheim.

Funds assist members with forestry plans and planning of operations, and can also be used for logging by members. Members' timber sales go through the group, which also sets the prices for buyers.
