= Halal certification in Europe =

Food certification to Islamic law

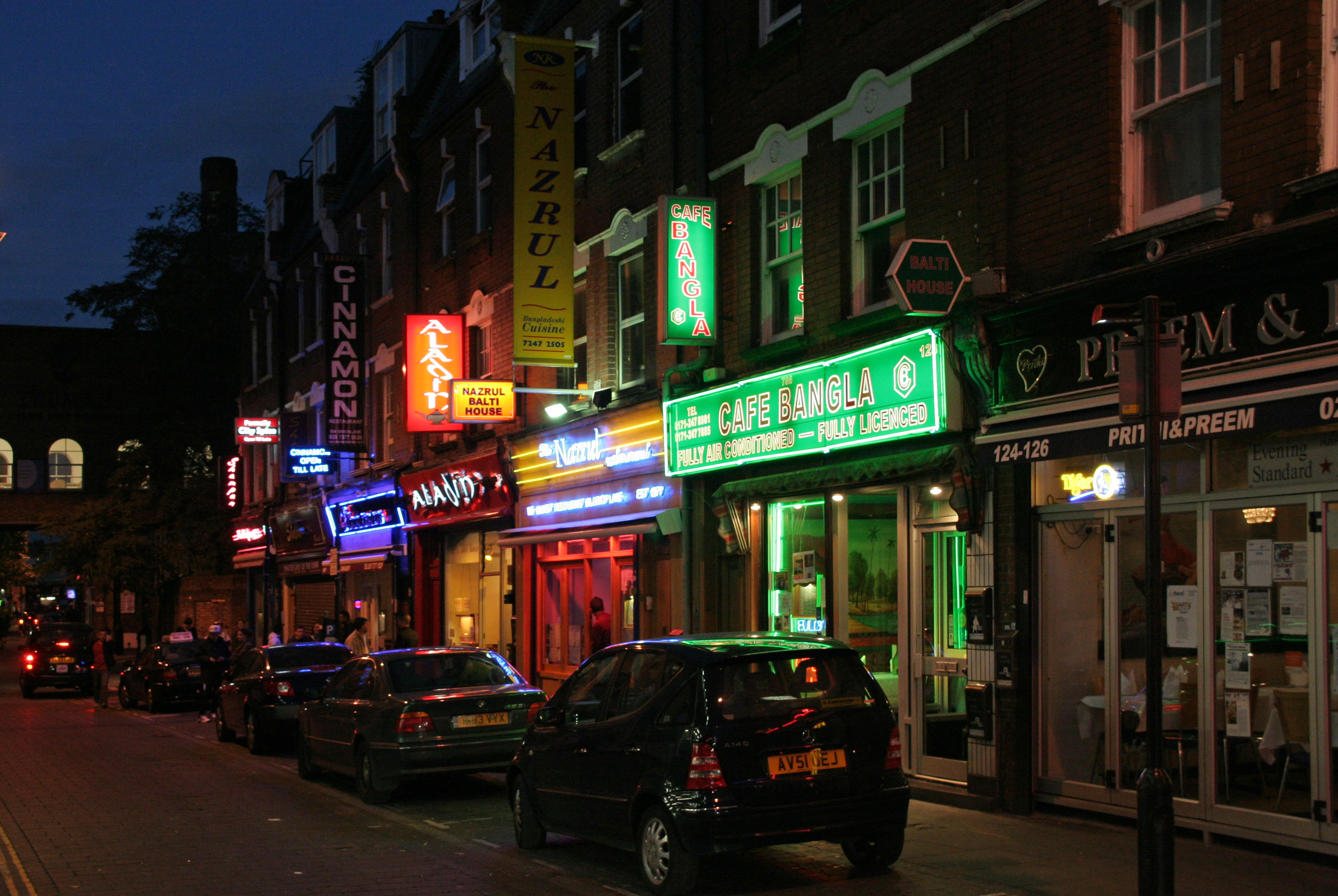
Bangladeshi-owned curry houses in Brick lane, known as the curry capital of London

Halal meat is meat of animal slaughtered according to Quran and Sunnah and thus permitted for consumption by Muslims.

Halal meat market is the segment of much bigger food market, which offers goods that can be deemed as halal. In the case of meat, the qualification of halal addresses the practice of slaughter, and it is therefore comparable to other credence attributes that refer to the method of production rather than to the intrinsic characteristics of the product.

Across the EU, an increasing number of religious and commercial organizations are promoting the segmentation of the halal meat market through qualification practices that have created an image of non-stunned meat as being of authentic halal quality.

== Introduction ==
Across Europe, halal meat markets are experiencing a period of unprecedented growth and development, though the intensity varies from country to country. In the UK and France there has been year-on-year growth for well over a decade, while in Germany the market is just starting to develop. The growth of these markets is in some way linked to the increasing number of Muslim immigrants across Europe and to the growing consumption of meat characteristic of vertical mobility amongst second and third generation Muslims. Halal meat and halal animal products are increasingly available in non-ethnic stores, particularly supermarket chains and fast food restaurants, and much as Jewish diners in the US are attracting large numbers of non-Jewish consumers, so the consumption of halal meat products by non-Muslims is also increasing across Europe.

== Stunning issue ==
As the market has grown the authenticity of the halal meat sold in supermarkets and fast food restaurants has also been questioned by some Muslims, who have reacted against the practice of stunning and the use of mechanical blades (in the case of poultry) allowed in the halal standards adopted by these economic actors.

Dispute between Muslims emerge from debates about the origins of Islam, which Muslims believe are derived from two sources — the Quran and Sunnah. While the Quran provides a detailed and, for some, infallible source of information about the origins of Islam, the Sunnah provides an account based on the application of the principles established in the Qur'an through the lived experience of the prophet Mohammed, as recorded in the Hadiths. Two prescriptive sets of guidelines for halal slaughter follow from these sources, and it is the underlying discourses as they are now interpreted on which current debate and controversy about the authenticity of halal meat stands.

The first position is based on an understanding that all people of the Book share common slaughter practices and that Muslims can therefore consume meat from animals reared and slaughtered by Jews and Christians as well as by Muslims. Closely aligned with mainstream science and animal welfare/rights concerns, this position is based on EU legislation for the protection of animals at time of killing, which requires all animals to be made unconscious by stunning prior to slaughter. However, this legislation is interpreted in different ways by different halal certification bodies. According to the Halal Food Authority (HFA) in the UK, poultry (chickens, turkeys and ducks) can only be immobilised prior to slaughter using electric water baths, while ovine animals (lamb, sheep and goat) can only be stunned using electric tongs. The majority of bovine animals (cattle, bull, cow and ox) in the UK are stunned with a captive-bolt pistol, but this is not permitted by the HFA because of the risk that it may kill the animal.

The second position, which emerges from a derogation of the above legislation, allows EU member states to grant slaughterhouses that supply Muslim and Jewish communities an exception from the requirement to stun animals prior to slaughter in line with the religious freedoms granted by Article 9 of the European Convention on Human Rights.

While all Islamic specialists agree that halal meat must emerge from the act of slaughter, adherents of this position, common amongst Sunni Muslims, argue that the status of halal meat is linked more directly to Islam and to traditional halal practices. On this account, Muslims are only permitted to consume the meat of an animal if the method of stunning used is reversible (i.e. animals are unconscious but still alive at the time of slaughter), the animal has been blessed by a Muslim prior to slaughter and the blood is allowed to drain completely post-slaughter. If this is not the case, the meat produced is rendered Haram (forbidden) rather than Halal (permitted). The main area of concern is with the perceived risk that instead of being made unconscious by stunning animals will suffer or be killed.

It is this controversy about the effectiveness of stunning that drives competition to define what is and is not authentic halal amongst certifying bodies.

== Halal meat market by country ==
=== United Kingdom ===
The Muslim population in the UK is very diverse, thought the vast majority have roots in South Asia, particularly Pakistan, Bangladesh and India. The population has increased rapidly over the last decade; between 2004 and 2008 it was reported to have grown by more than 500,000 to around 2.4 million, a growth rate ten times faster than the rest of society. The market for halal meat is also growing at a significant rate, with the Halal Food Authority (HFA), the major halal certifying body in the UK, estimating a 30% growth in 2006 alone. However, there is still a great deal of resistance to buying fresh halal meat at supermarkets and it has been estimated that around 70-80% of all halal meat in the UK is fake. Although things are starting to change as supermarket sales increase, many Muslims still prefer to buy fresh meat from independent retailers, who are seen to offer trust in the face of growing concerns about the authenticity of the commercial forms of halal meat that have emerged alongside market growth.

As the UK's oldest and largest certification body, the HFA has been at the centre of much of the recent debate and controversy created by market expansion. Set up in 1994 to regulate halal meat through the licensing of slaughterhouses, the HFA emerged just as halal was becoming an important aspect of Muslim identity in the UK. Prior to this, many Muslims considered meat sold in mainstream retail outlets to be produced by people of the Book and therefore suitable for consumption.

=== France ===
France has the largest Muslim population in Europe. In 2000 official sources suggested that there were four million French Muslims, but more recently a figure of seven million has been put forward. Most French Muslim's have links with the Maghreb in North Africa, though there are also large numbers from West Africa and Turkey. The French market for halal meat has been growing steadily since the 1970s, but much like the UK market it has grown rapidly over the last decade as halal has become central to the religious and cultural identity of many young Muslims. Unlike the UK, however, where the vast majority of halal slaughter is performed with pre-stunning, in France most halal slaughter is performed with no stunning. Notwithstanding these differences, the problems that have emerged as the halal market has expanded are very similar; market growth is currently estimated to stand at around 15% annually, with the market valued at between 3 and 5 billion euros. Research participants suggested that calls for better certification have also intensified during this period, and much like the UK this trend is reflected in the marketing strategies of French supermarket and fast food chains.

French market is huge and hard to define and there is a widespread feeling that it is in a mess. Consumers are increasingly warned about unlabelled halal meat and there have been rumours that as much as 90% of commercial halal meat is fake. Certification is sometimes presented as the solution to these problems, but it has been estimated that there may be as many as 50 separate halal labels and certification schemes operating across France.

=== Germany ===
Germany has a population of more than 82 million, of whom approximately 4% are Muslim of Turkish origin. Although things are starting to change, the German halal meat market is still in its infancy compared to the UK and French markets. Debate about the authenticity of commercial forms of halal meat has only recently intensified as consumer concerns about animal welfare have forced the Aldi and Lidl supermarket chains to think through the implications of selling halal meat. Consequently, as an executive from Germany's major certification body — the Halal Quality Control (HQC) www.hqc.eu and European Halal Certification Institute (EHZ) — pointed out, because German consumers are not overly concerned about the expansion of the halal market at the present time, debate about the merits of pre-stunned and non-stunned meat has not emerged to the same extent as it has done elsewhere.

While the German market remains underdeveloped compared to the UK and French markets, it is starting to get more attention from international producers and certification agencies. The German Federation of Turkish Wholesalers and Retailers recently claimed that German companies would be well advised to embrace the halal market, while the Malaysian National News Agency Bernama has also drawn attention to the potential the German market offers Malaysian producers. How long it takes for the market to grow as it has done elsewhere depends, it appears, on the take up of these opportunities by halal entrepreneurs and on the ongoing attempt to foster halal standardization.

=== Norway ===
The majority of Norway's 72,000 Muslims live in the capital city Oslo; most are of Pakistani origin, though immigration from Somalia has recently increased. Animal welfare standards in Norway are widely regarded as the highest in the world; unlike the EU, where the derogation of EU legislation for the protection of animals at the time of killing allows minority groups to practice stunning without slaughter in line with their own cultural traditions, under Norwegian law it is a requirement that all animals are stunned prior to slaughter. While the Jewish population still import kosher meat to bypass this stringent regulation, collaboration between the Muslim community and the Norwegian food authorities has facilitated an ongoing process of halal standardization that has been beneficial for everyone concerned. Unlike the EU countries discussed above, the grocery sector in Norway is horizontally rather than vertically integrated, with manufacturers and farmer's cooperatives rather than retailers dominating. The major producer of halal meat in Norway is the farmer's cooperative Nortura. As well as selling carcasses and cuts of halal meat in the marketplace, Nortura also supply processed halal products through their own-label halal brand Alfathi, which they purchased outright from a Somali entrepreneur in 2006. Prior to this, the owner of Alfathi worked with the Norwegian Islamic Council to find a slaughtering method that different Muslim groups could agree on, and which the Norwegian Food Safety Authority would validate. As the latter was not interested in dialogue, this was a difficult task and it took over two years to convince Norway's Imams that Alfathi halal was trustworthy. Eventually a small number of Imams travelled to Nortura's abattoir to observe production procedures and soon afterwards a method of slaughter acceptable to all parties was agreed. With the Imams operating as certifiers of halal meat in their own communities trust began to grow and a small range of processed halal products began to appear in Norwegian supermarkets. Dialogue has continued over recent years, primarily over the introduction of halal chicken into the Norwegian market, though there are worries that the encroachment of the European market and the emergence of a more mixed Muslim population — adhering to different schools of thought — will undermine the country's high animal welfare standards and challenge the halal consensus.

== See also ==
- Halal certification in Australia
- Halal certification in India
- Halal certification in the Philippines
