= AT Skog =

Norwegian forestry organization

AT Skog BA is a regional forestry organisation for Agder counties and Telemark, and the district organisation of Norges Skogeierforbund. AT Skog has around 8500 members, organised in 54 local forestry groups. The organisation is based in Skien.

Funds assist members with forestry plans and planning of operations, and can also be used for logging by members. Members' timber sales go through the group, which also sets the prices for buyers.
