= Halal certification in the Philippines =

Islamic product certification in the Philippines

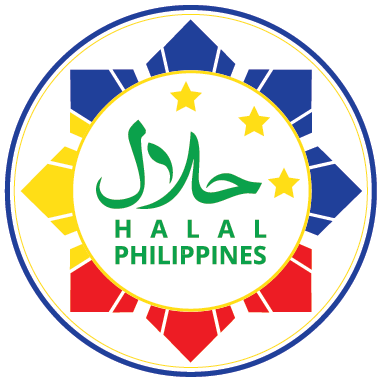
Philippine national Halal certification logo. (full-color version).

Halal literally means "permissible" in Arabic and refers to goods, including food items and services, that are permissible to consume or use under Sharia law. In contrast, haram (lit. "unlawful") refers to goods that are forbidden to consume or use. Despite being a Christian-majority country, the Philippines has a state-sanctioned program to facilitate halal certification of goods under the Halal Act of 2016.

== Background ==
The Philippines is a Christian-majority country, although there are state-led efforts to develop the halal certification process for purposes such as international trade and encouraging more halal tourism by providing dining options for Muslim tourists. As of 2018, the Philippines contributes only 5 percent to the global halal industry trade, according to its Department of Trade and Industry (DTI). The Philippine government seeks to expand and develop the halal certification process to enhance its export industry with Muslim-majority countries. The government has also promoted halal-certified food items to non-Muslims since these items are free from alcohol, pork, and pork-derived products.

== Halal Act of 2016 ==
There is national legislation mandating the government to regulate the halal certification of goods in the Philippines and promote halal-certified goods for export. This legislation is known as the Philippine Halal Export Development and Promotion Program Act of 2016 (Republic Act 10817). The law took effect on July 26, 2017, after its implementing rules and regulations were approved.

The law established the Halal Export Development and Promotion Board, an inter-agency body led by the Department of Trade and Industry. This board includes the National Commission on Muslim Filipinos, the Departments of Agriculture, Department of Health, Department of Foreign Affairs, Department of Tourism, Department of Science and Technology, the Bangko Sentral ng Pilipinas (the country's central bank), and the Mindanao Development Authority, along with two Muslim Filipino professionals to facilitate its implementation.

Prior to the passage of the Halal Act of 2016, the National Commission on Muslim Filipinos (NCMF) was already mandated under Republic Act 9997 of 2010 to develop the halal industry and accredit halal certifying bodies. The NCMF itself replaced the defunct Office on Muslim Affairs.

== Halal certification ==
=== Bodies ===
The DTI's Philippine Accreditation Bureau (PAB) is the sole agency responsible for accrediting halal-certification bodies, inspection bodies, and testing and calibration laboratories. The PAB has represented the Philippines in the International Halal Accreditation Forum since 2017. The Department of Science and Technology has set up a network of one-stop laboratories, known as OneLab, which also conduct halal testing. As of 2020, there are nine halal-certification bodies (HCBs) in the Philippines, namely:

- Islamic Da'wah Council of the Philippines
- Halal Development Institute of the Philippines
- Mindanao Halal Authority
- Muslim Mindanao Halal Certification Board
- Halal International Chamber of Commerce and Industries in the Philippines
- Islamic Advocate on Halal and Development
- Philippine Ulama Congress Organization inc
- Alliance for Halal Integrity in the Philippines
- Prime Certification and Inspection Asia Pacific

HCBs can also certify non-food items such as cosmetics, pharmaceutical products including vaccines.

=== Mark ===
The Philippine government adopted a national halal logo or mark in July 2019 to identify halal-certified products produced in the country. There are two versions of the mark: a monochrome version for labeling purposes to reduce printing costs, and a full-color version for other printing materials. Halal-certification bodies also have their own halal logos, which are still authorized for use even after the adoption of the 2019 national halal logo.

== See also ==
- Sharia in the Philippines
- Halal certification in Europe
- Halal certification in Australia
- Halal certification in India
