= Prior (brand) =

Norwegian brand of eggs and white meat

- Product type: Eggs; White meat
- Current owner: Nortura
- Country: Norway
- Markets: Norway
- Previous owners: 1977 - Norsk Eggcentral; 1999 - Prior Norge; 2006 - Nortura
- Website: http://www.prior.no/

Prior is a brand name used by Nortura on its eggs and white meat (mainly chicken, hen and turkey). The brand dates back to 1977 when Norsk Eggcentral rebranded Sol-egg to Prior. The brand was owned by Prior Norge until 2006 when it merged with Gilde Norsk Kjøtt to form Nortura.
