= Halal certification in Australia =

Food certification to Islamic law

Halal literally means "permissible" in Arabic and refers to food items that are permissible to consume under Sharia law, whereas haram (lit. "unlawful") refers to any substance not permitted to consume. According to the Australian Food and Grocery Council, halal foods must be "free from any substance taken or extracted from a haram animal or ingredient (e.g. pigs, dogs, carnivorous animals, animals not slaughtered in compliance with Islamic rites); [be] made, processed, manufactured and/or stored by using utensils, equipment and/or machinery that has been cleaned according to Islamic law (e.g. not cleaned with alcohol); and [be] free from contact with, or being close to, a haram substance during preparation, manufacture, processing and storage (e.g. blood, alcohol, poisonous and intoxicating plants and insects such as worms [sic] and cockroaches)."

The Australian Government does not have a formal role in labeling halal food for domestic consumption.

Halal goods serve as part of the trade links between Australia and several Muslim countries, particularly Middle Eastern ones, although many non Muslim countries also form significant part of Halal products' consumer base. Halal meat and meat product exports to the Middle East and Southeast Asia have greatly increased from the 1970s onwards. This expansion was due in part to efforts of the Australian Federation of Islamic Councils. Certification, which involves both costs and restrictions, is necessary to access this large export market. The federal Department of Agriculture approves the certification of halal food for export to Islamic countries.

== Background ==
In 1981, a meat substitution scandal where substitution of horse and kangaroo meat for beef in consignments for overseas exports threatened the reputation of the Australian meat export industry. The next year, a Royal Commission into the meat industry investigated mislabelling of meat products, which included forged halal certificates. The Royal Commission said that halal certification monopolies should be avoided and that fees charged should "not be seen as a way of raising revenue for other Muslim purposes unconnected with the meat industry."

== Australian certification for halal meat exports ==
In Australia specified halal accreditation agencies are permitted to certify as halal the exports of red meat and red meat products to Indonesia, Malaysia, Saudi Arabia, Singapore, United Arab Emirates and Qatar. Approaches have been made to the Indonesian Ulema Council (MUI) by various Australian agencies to establish accreditation for particular Australian certification arrangements to secure the export trade for halal-certified meat products. For approval, Indonesia specifies that there be both a scientist and an expert in Islamic law working within the Australian organisation seeking halal accreditation. During the lobbying process by Australia for Indonesian halal accreditation, corruption has been alleged and denied.

In assessing halal meat exports to the US, an investigation by Halal Advocates of America covered "over ten" slaughterhouses in Australia. They determined that there are differences in the, "degree of reliability and trustworthiness" of Australian halal certifying bodies, that pre-stunning is being used and that none of the slaughterers had "deviated beliefs or belonged to one of the deviated sects". The investigators said they were satisfied with the certification processes of ICCV and SICHMA and said there was great potential in working with these two organisations in the future.

== Certification bodies ==
Halal certification in Australia began in 1974. The Australian Federation of Islamic Councils (AFIC) was initially recommended by a 1974 delegation from Saudi Arabia, as the "sole authority in Australia to certify that meat had been killed in accordance with Islamic rites" for Muslims in Australia. As at March 2017 there were 22 Islamic groups approved by the federal government to issue halal certificates for export. Some of the major halal certifiers are: the Australian Federation of Islamic Councils (AFIC); the Halal Certification Authority Australia; the Supreme Islamic Council of Halal Meat in Australia; the Islamic Co-ordinating Council of Victoria; and Halal Australia. These organisations charge fees for their services. A Parliamentary Library publication provides further details regarding the halal certification process and bodies which provide services within Australia. It states that the prices vary "depending on the product involved, the organisation from which certification is sought and whether the goods are for export or domestic consumption. However, the fees are often modest." It is reported that AFIC earns up to $1 million a year from halal certification.

Similarly, the certification of food produced in Australia as kosher (the other primary form of religion-based certification) is largely conducted by two non-government organisations. In states not covered by these organisations local rabbis undertake this duty. The kosher certification bodies also charge fees for this service.

== Debate regarding halal slaughter ==
There is a debate within the Muslim community over whether meat from animals which are killed after first being stunned can be considered halal. While research undertaken by Meat & Livestock Australia supports the use of pre-slaughter stunning, Ikebal Patel, the then-president of AFIC, believes, "the jury is still out". The RSPCA says while the vast majority of halal slaughter in Australia involves pre-slaughter stunning, "the slaughter of a fully conscious animal is inhumane and completely unnecessary" and is strongly lobbying for action against this practice for all domestic and export animals.

== Halal logos as registered trade marks ==
Australian halal certification marks can be registered by the legal owner under the Australian Trade Mark Act. Doing so requires the owner to consistently provide products of the specified standard. Mis-use of trade marks can lead to legal penalties: In a 2014 court case, HCAA successfully sued a meat supplier which had provided a certificate to two kebab shops which included the authority's trade mark and wrongly claimed that it had certified the meat. The Supreme Court awarded damages, against the wholesaler, of $91,015.00 being 150% of the annual licence fees, that would have been otherwise payable. A 2015 Senate inquiry recommended that all halal certification schemes register trade marks and for the sector to consider adopting a single trade mark to improve confidence that products marketed as halal meet the required standards.

== Proceeds of certification ==
Despite claims by some Australian anti-Islam groups of halal certification funds terrorism, a report by the ABC fact-checking unit found that the profits of halal certification go to Islamic schools and mosques.

== Opposition to halal certification ==
Halal food certification has been criticised by groups who claim that certifying foods as halal leads to consumers subsidizing a particular religious belief.

In 2014, anti-halal-certification groups campaigned against Australian food companies in an attempt to discourage them from having their food certified as being halal. Some of these groups argued that the cost of certification increases the prices of food to all consumers, and that the fees charged for certification are used to fund terrorism. In November 2014 Fleurieu Milk & Yoghurt Company decided to stop producing halal products after being targeted by campaigners, and a number of other large and small companies were also reported to have been targeted. Keysar Trad from the Australian Federation of Islamic Councils told a journalist in July 2014 that "hate groups" were attempting to exploit anti-Muslim sentiments.

In 2015, the head of the Halal Certification Authority Australia, Mohammed El-Mouelhy took legal action in the NSW Supreme Court against members of the Q Society of Australia and the owner of a website entitled HalalChoices. El-Mouelhy claims he has been defamed in relation to the proceeds of halal certification. The case was settled out of court in 2017.

In mid-2017 it was revealed several companies in Australia including Kellogg's had ceased paying for halal certification. They denied it was in response to pressure from campaigners. Commenting on this, a spokesman for Kellog's said, “As most of our cereals are plant-based, they’re inherently halal, so we chose not to renew our certification...This was a commercial decision, not the result of any public pressure or backlash.

== Parliamentary response ==
In May 2015, the Australian Senate announced it would inquire into "third-party certification of food" with one of the terms of reference being an examination of Australian food certification schemes, and certifiers, including those related to halal foods.

The inquiry's final report was released on 1 December 2015. It recommended that the federal government increase its oversight of domestic halal certifiers to address fraudulent conduct in the sector. It said that it had heard, "credible reports suggesting that the lack of regulation has been unscrupulously exploited". In tabling the report, committee chairman Sam Dastyari said, "Some certifiers are nothing more than scammers." The inquiry examined claims that fees charged by halal certifiers are used to fund terrorism and found that no evidence supports them. The inquiry also determined that halal fees are not used to support organised crime in Australia. It also concluded that the fees do not increase the cost of food to Australians, and that the availability of halal certification allows Australian exporters to access very large international markets. The committee recommended a single halal certification authority. The committee in recommending clearer labelling, specifically referred to the need for meat processors to label products sourced from animals subject to religious slaughter.

The inquiry could not establish detailed information on names and numbers of non-meat product certifiers.

On 22 June 2017 Senator Pauline Hanson, the leader of Pauline Hanson's One Nation moved a motion in the Australian Senate calling on the government to respond to the inquiry. The motion was passed.

In August 2017, the government said it would consider amending regulations in relation to halal certification for export and also consider standardising the certification of food in the domestic market.

== See also ==
- Central Adelaide Mosque – a halal certifier
- Dhabihah
- Halal certification in India
- Halal certification in Europe
- Halal certification in the Philippines
- Islam in Australia
  - Islamic organisations in Australia
- Islamic dietary laws
- Legal aspects of ritual slaughter
- Religion in Australia
