= Gilde Norsk Kjøtt =

Meat processor in Norway

Gilde Norsk Kjøtt BA
- Industry: Red meat
- Founded: 1931
- Defunct: 2006
- Fate: Merger
- Successor: Nortura
- Headquarters: Oslo, Norway
- Products: Gilde; Terina; Alfathi

Gilde Norsk Kjøtt is a defunct Norwegian red meat processing company organised as an agricultural cooperative. The company was by far the largest processor in the country when it merged with Prior Norge in 2006 to create Nortura. The company had gradually grown together as the slaughter cooperatives in the country had merged. It was not until 2000 that the company fully merged into one legal entity. Before this it had been an association between various local slaughterhouses.

== History ==
The first farmer owned slaughterhouse in Norway was Hamar Slagteri AS founded in 1904. Seven years later Fellesslakteriet was founded in Oslo as the first slaughter cooperative. 1930 sees the Trade Act that secured stable prices for both farmers and consumers. The background for this was overproduction that had forced down the produce prices and bankrupt many farmers. The next year Norges Kjøtt og Fleskesentral (NKF) is established as a membership organisation for all slaughterhouses in Norway. In 1958 NKF reorganised creating 17 district organisations to manage the processing and the following year Gilde is launched in Northern Norway.

In 1990 the name of the company changed to Norsk Kjøttsamvirke BA that was kept until 2004 when it took the name Gilde Norsk Kjøtt BA. But not until 2000 is the company actually completely merged so the mother company owns all the processing plants. The company merged with Prior Norge to create Nortura in 2006.

== Branding ==
The Gilde brand name was taken into use nationally in 1964, after it had been used at first in Northern Norway since 1959. In 1971 Gilde made an agreement with Norges Kooperative Landsforening to create the common brand Goman that was to deliver meat to the cooperative stores. The company also adapted a separate organic food brand as under the Gilde brand during the 2000s. These products were exclusively distributed through the Coop and Norgesgruppen stores. In 2001 Gilde launched the brand Alfathi that made Norwegian cuisine meats following the Muslim rules of halal. Other minor brands included the smoked meat Eldhus. Gilde also produced a number of frozen and canned food under the brand Terina.
