= Felleskjøpet =

Norwegian agricultural cooperative

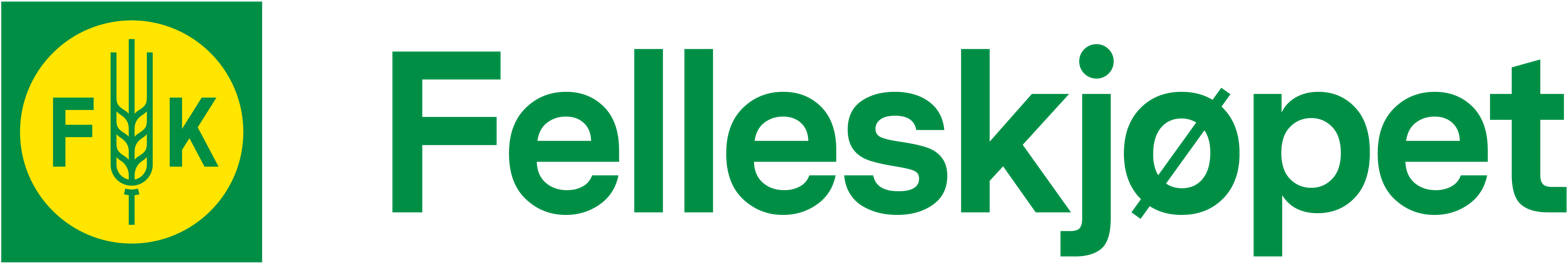
- Type: Cooperative
- Industry: Agriculture
- Founded: 1896
- Headquarters: Norway
- Area served: Norway
- Revenue: ▲NOK 10.6 billion (2006)
- Number of employees: 1,735
- Website: www.fk.no

Felleskjøpet (Norwegian: [fɛlːəsjøːpət]) or FK is a Norwegian agricultural cooperative that serves as a retailer of agricultural operating equipment including animal food and seeds. It is also a wholesaler of grains.

The corporation is organised into three separate independent companies that share the same brand and cooperate extensively, Felleskjøpet Agri, Felleskjøpet Rogaland Agder and Felleskjøpet Nordmøre og Romsdal (Agri and Nordmøre og Romsdal merged in 2015). The company had a revenue of NOK 10.6 billion in 2006 operation 105 stores, 61 workshops and 55 grain reception with 1,735 employees. Felleskjøpet is owned by 54,207 members and is one of 13 agricultural cooperatives in Norway.

== History ==
The need for an agricultural retailing system evolved through the mid-19th century; and, in 1896, the first Felleskjøp, Landhusholdningselskaberbnes Fællesinnkjøbsforening was founded, soon followed by more. Eventually they started to merge, and 2006 saw the merger between Felleskjøpet Trondheim and Felleskjøpet ØstVest to Felleskjøpet Agri, creating a company covering almost the entire country.
