= Honningcentralen =

Norwegian honey processor and distributor

Honningcentralen SA
- Type: Cooperative
- Industry: Honey
- Founded: 28 November 1927
- Headquarters: Kløfta, Norway
- Area served: Norway
- Key people: Knud Fahrendorff (CEO)
- Number of employees: 18 (2026)
- Website: www.honning.no

Honningcentralen AL is a Norwegian processor and distributor of honey with two processing plants, at Kløfta and Grimstad. It is organized as an agricultural cooperative with 1,200 members. In addition to Norwegian honey, Honningcentralen imports honey from Central Europe.

== History ==
The cooperative was founded on 28 November 1927, but until World War II there was not a good market for retailing honey. After the war sugar was rationed and honey became an important substitute. The most important aspect was to cover medical needs, and hospitals, orphanages and pharmacies were prioritised. The rest was distributed out between the wholesalers. The rationing was removed in 1952. The plant in Grimstad opened in the 1970s and in 2005 the headquarters moved from Oslo to Kløfta.
