= Industrikraft Midt-Norge =

Norwegian energy company

Industrikraft Midt-Norge AS
- Type: Private
- Industry: Power
- Founded: 1998
- Defunct: 20 March 2023
- Headquarters: Levanger, Norway
- Area served: Norway
- Products: Electricity; Steam
- Parent: Nord-Trøndelag Elektrisitetsverk; Trondheim Energi; Norske Skog; Statoil
- Website: www.industrikraft.no

Industrikraft Midt-Norge is a Norwegian energy company that holds a permit to build a thermal power plant fueled primarily by natural gas from Haltenbanken, but also partially from biofuel, at the Fiborgtangen industrial site in Levanger Municipality, Norway. The company is owned by Nord-Trøndelag Elektrisitetsverk, Trondheim Energi, Norske Skog and Statoil. Elkem has sold its ownership in the company.

The planned power plant would involve two generators producing a total of 800 megawatts (1,100,000 hp) of electricity, that would give an annual production of 6.4 terawatt-hours (23 PJ). About 0.2 terawatt-hours (0.72 PJ) of this is to be used as steam to power the paper mill Norske Skog Skogn that is collocated at Fiborgtangen. A construction of the plant would require a gas pipe to be built from the landing site at Tjeldbergodden in Møre og Romsdal up though Trondheimsfjord to Fiborgtangen. The company received a permit to start construction in 2001, and in 2006 the permit was extended to allow start-up of construction until 2012. As of 2007 no decision has been made to start construction.
