= Selskap med begrenset ansvar =

Selskap med begrenset ansvar, with short form BA, is a Norwegian term for a corporation comparable to a limited liability company. Meaning literally Company with limited liability, it is a type of corporate structure used in Norway for limited companies based on a co-operative structure.

== Legal framework ==
Unlike the aksjeselskap (AS), a regular stock-based limited company, the BA is structured either as a Særlovsselskap, a company founded under a particular act of legislature or as a cooperative. In the latter case, the limitations and legal framework is set out in the [Limited Liability Companies Act] of 1997 ss 1-1(3).3, a Norwegian Act of Parliament relating to limited liability companies covering: "companies formed in order to promote the members' consumer or professional interests or companies formed to secure employment for the members"

== Difference from an AS company ==
The most notable difference between a regular limited company (AS) and a BA is that while the distribution of profits in an AS in general follows the ownership (N% of the shares receive N% of the distributed profits), the distribution of profits in a BA must in general follow the members shares of the revenues of the company. Typically someone representing N% of the revenues of a BA company will receive N% of the profits (standard consumer co-operative distribution of profits). The Legislation Department of the Norwegian Ministry of Justice and the Police have indicated that a minor percentage of profits distributed based upon ownership may still be accepted.

== Usage ==
The most prominent uses of BA companies are in local Coop retail cooperatives and the agriculture cooperatives. Formerly a number of state enterprises were BA companies, including the Norwegian State Railways, the Postal Service and Postbanken. All of these have been converted to AS's.
