= Nortura =

Norwegian agricultural cooperative

Nortura SA
- Company type: Cooperative
- Industry: Meat processing
- Founded: 2006
- Headquarters: Oslo, Norway
- Area served: Norway
- Products: Gilde; Prior; Terina; Alfathi; Eldhus; Thulefjord
- Revenue: ▲NOK 23.545 billion (2017)
- Operating income: NOK 153 million (2017)
- Net income: 26,000,000 Norwegian krone (2018)
- Number of employees: 5231 (2017)
- Website: www.nortura.no

Nortura is a Norwegian agricultural cooperative that operates slaughterhouses and other processing plants related to meat and eggs. The company was created as a merger between Gilde Norsk Kjøtt and Prior Norge in 2006, and has head offices in Oslo.

Nortura is Norway's biggest food supplier. It processed 222 thousand tonnes of meat at 31 plants in 2017.

The company is owned by about 18,900 farmers throughout the country and is one of 13 agricultural cooperatives in Norway. Annual revenue is NOK 23,5 billion. The main brands include Gilde (red meat), Prior (white meat and eggs), Alfathi (halal slaughtered meat), and Eldhus (smoked meat).
