= Prior Norge =

Norwegian food processing cooperative

Prior Norge BA
- Industry: Food processing
- Founded: 1919
- Defunct: 2006
- Fate: Merger
- Successor: Nortura
- Headquarters: Oslo, Norway
- Products: Prior eggs and white meat

Prior Norge is a defunct Norwegian white meat and egg processing company organised as an agricultural cooperative. The company merged with Gilde Norsk Kjøtt in 2006 to create Nortura. The Prior brand is still used.

== History ==
The first national union of the egg cooperative was founded on October 25, 1919, when six local egg centres created Norske Eggcentral A/L. At this time, 180,000 Norwegian households, or 30% of all households, had their own chickens. By 1929 eggs compromised 98% of the revenue of Norske Eggcentral, white meat 2%.

The central started with quality sorting and marking of all eggs in 1934 and the brand Sol-egg was introduced. During and after World War II there was rationing of eggs in Norway, but this was suspended in 1949. In the 1950s the egg central started active marketing through advertisements and in 1977 the Sol-egg brand was replaced with the Prior brand on all eggs and white meat.

During the 1990s the Norwegian chicken breed was replaced by a meatier, Scottish breed called Ross. In 1999 the company changed its name to Prior Norge, and two years later organised as a corporation with egg packaging facilities and slaughterhouses owned by three regional companies. These were again merged in 2003. By 2005 the white meat sector had passed the egg sector in revenue. On 1 November 2006 Prior merged with Gilde Norsk Kjøtt to create Nortura. The Prior brand still lives on.
