= Gilde =

Brand name used by Nortura

- Product type: Red meat
- Current owner: Nortura
- Country: Norway
- Markets: Norway
- Previous owners: 1959 - Norges Kjøtt og Fleskesentral; 1990 - Norsk Kjøttsamvirke; 2006 - Nortura
- Website: https://www.gilde.no/

Gilde is a brand name used by the Norwegian meat processing company Nortura.

Until 2006 the brand was managed by the agricultural cooperative Gilde Norsk Kjøtt who then merged with Prior Norge to form Nortura. The brand was first used in Northern Norway by the local meat cooperatives in 1959, and became a national brand in 1964.

There is a full range of red meat products available under the Gilde brand, including

- Biff (beef)
- Pølser (wieners)
- Edelgris (pork)
- Birkebeiner (cured meats)
- Go' og Mager (milk free and low fat meat)
- Gourmet Lam (lamb meat from Hardangervidda)
- Norsk Gourmet Kalv (veal)
- Norsk Kjøttfe (beef from the breeds Charolais, Hereford, Simmental, Aberdeen Angus and Limousin)
- Naturlig Godt økologisk (organic)
- Grill Sausage
