= Halal =

Islamic term for "permissible" things

The word halal. It is used as a visual marker for Muslims in restaurants, shops and on products.

Halal (/həˈlɑːl/; Arabic: حلال ḥalāl [ħaˈlaːl]) is an Arabic word that translates to 'permissible' in English. Although the term halal is often associated with Islamic dietary laws, particularly meat that is slaughtered according to Islamic guidelines, it also governs ethical practices in business, finance (such as the prohibition of usury (riba)), and daily living. It encompasses broader ethical considerations, including fairness, social justice, and the treatment of animals. The concept of halal is central to Islamic practices and is derived from the Quran and the Sunnah (the teachings and practices of the Prophet Muhammad).

In the Quran, the term halal is contrasted with the term haram ('forbidden, unlawful'). The guidelines for what is considered halal or haram are laid out in Islamic jurisprudence (fiqh), and scholars interpret these guidelines to ensure compliance with Islamic principles. This binary opposition was elaborated into a more complex classification known as "the five decisions": mandatory, recommended, neutral, reprehensible and forbidden. Islamic jurists disagree on whether the term halal covers the first two or the first four of these categories. In recent times, Islamic movements seeking to mobilize the masses and authors writing for a popular audience have emphasized the simpler distinction of halal and haram.

In the modern world, the concept of halal has expanded beyond individual actions and dietary restrictions to become a global industry, particularly in the food, pharmaceutical, cosmetic, and financial sectors. Halal certification bodies ensure that products and services meet the required standards for consumption by Muslims, and many companies worldwide seek halal certification to cater to the growing demand for halal products, especially with the rise in the global Muslim population. The increasing demand for halal products and services has led to the growth of the halal economy, especially in countries with significant Muslim populations, such as Malaysia, Indonesia, and the Middle East. Many non-Muslim-majority countries also engage in the halal market to meet the needs of their Muslim citizens and global consumers.

== In the Quran ==
The words halal and haram are the common terms used in the Quran to designate the categories of lawful or allowed and unlawful or forbidden. In the Quran, the root ḥ-l-l denotes lawfulness and may also indicate exiting the ritual state of a pilgrim and entering a profane state. In both these senses, it has an opposite meaning to that conveyed by the root ḥ-r-m (cf. haram and ihram). In a literal sense, the root ḥr-m may refer to dissolution (e.g., breaking of an oath) or alighting (e.g., of God's wrath). Lawfulness is usually indicated in the Quran by means of the verb ahalla ('to make lawful'), with God as the stated or implied subject.

== Foods ==
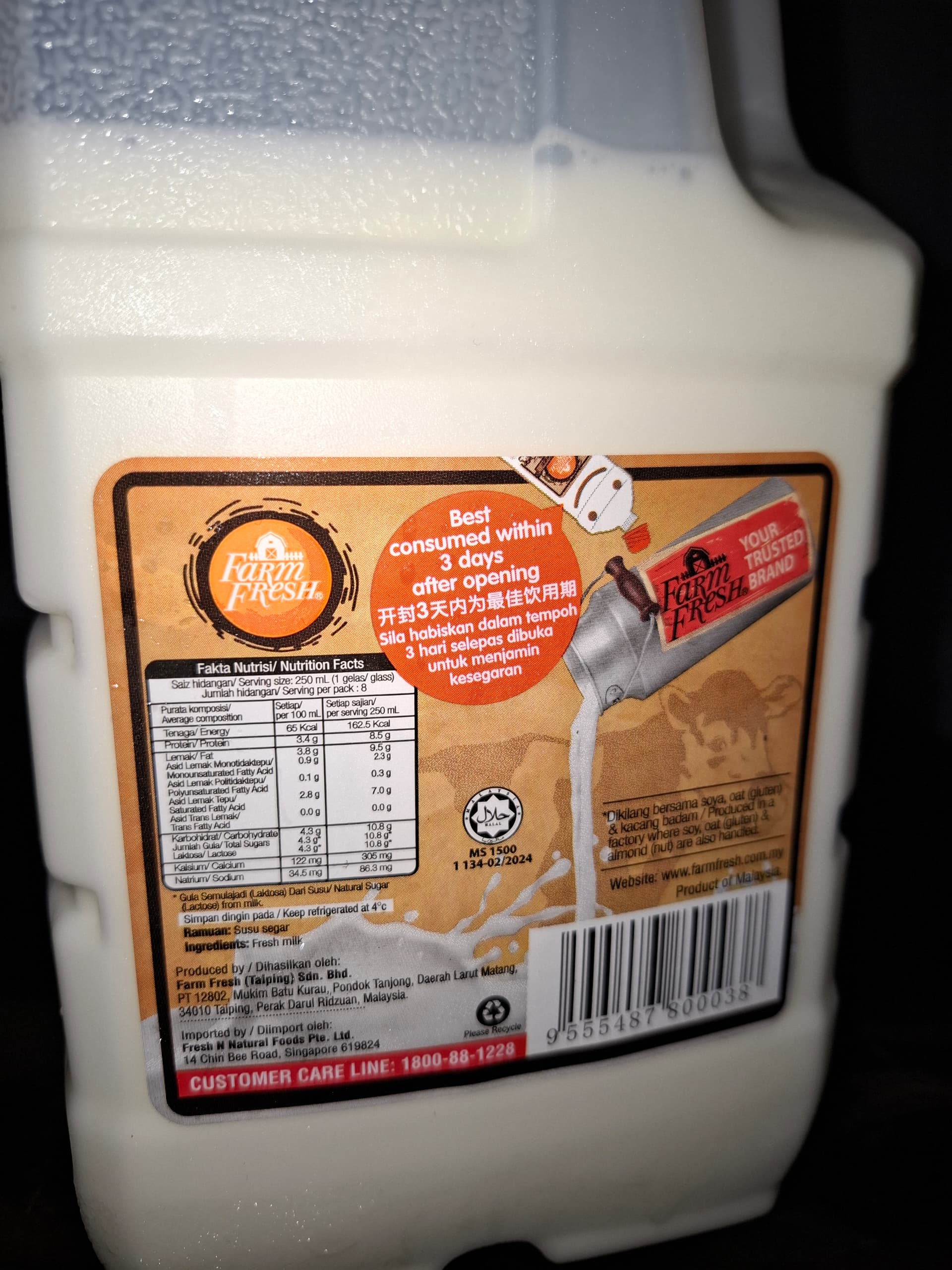
A 2 Liter (0.52 US Gal) jug of Farm Fresh milk, with the JAKIM Halal logo stamped in the middle of the label. Due to its stringent certification process, it stands out as one of the most recognized foreign halal certification bodies.

Islam generally considers every food halal unless it is specifically prohibited in hadith or the Qur'an. Specifically, halal foods are those that are:

1. Made, produced, manufactured, processed, and stored using machinery, equipment, and/or utensils that have been cleaned according to Islamic law (shariah).
2. Free from any component that Muslims are prohibited from eating according to Islamic law.

The most common example of haram (non-halal) food is pork. While pork is the only meat that categorically may not be consumed by Muslims (the Quran forbids it, Surah 2:173 and 16:115) other foods not in a state of purity are also considered haram. The criteria for non-pork items include their source, the cause of the animal's death and how it was processed. The majority of Islamic scholars consider shellfish and other seafood halal. Vegetarian cuisine is halal if it does not contain alcohol.

Muslims must also ensure that all foods (particularly processed foods), as well as non-food items like cosmetics and pharmaceuticals, are halal. Frequently, these products contain animal by-products or other ingredients that are not permissible for Muslims to eat or use on their bodies. Foods which are not considered halal for Muslims to consume include blood and intoxicants such as alcoholic beverages.

A Muslim who would otherwise starve to death is allowed to eat non-halal food if there is no halal food available.

Several food companies offer halal processed foods and products, including halal foie gras, spring rolls, chicken nuggets, ravioli, lasagna, pizza and baby food. Halal ready meals are a growing consumer market for Muslims in Britain and America and are offered by an increasing number of retailers.

Opinions on GMO foods are mixed, although there is no widely accepted prohibition from consuming them. Some clerics and scholars have expressed support, arguing that such food production methods are halal because they contribute to human well-being. Voices in opposition to GMOs argue that there is no need for genetic modification of food crops because God created everything perfectly and man does not have any right to manipulate anything that God has created. Some others have raised concern about the theoretical consumption of specific GMO foods produced using genes from pigs.

=== Halal meat ===
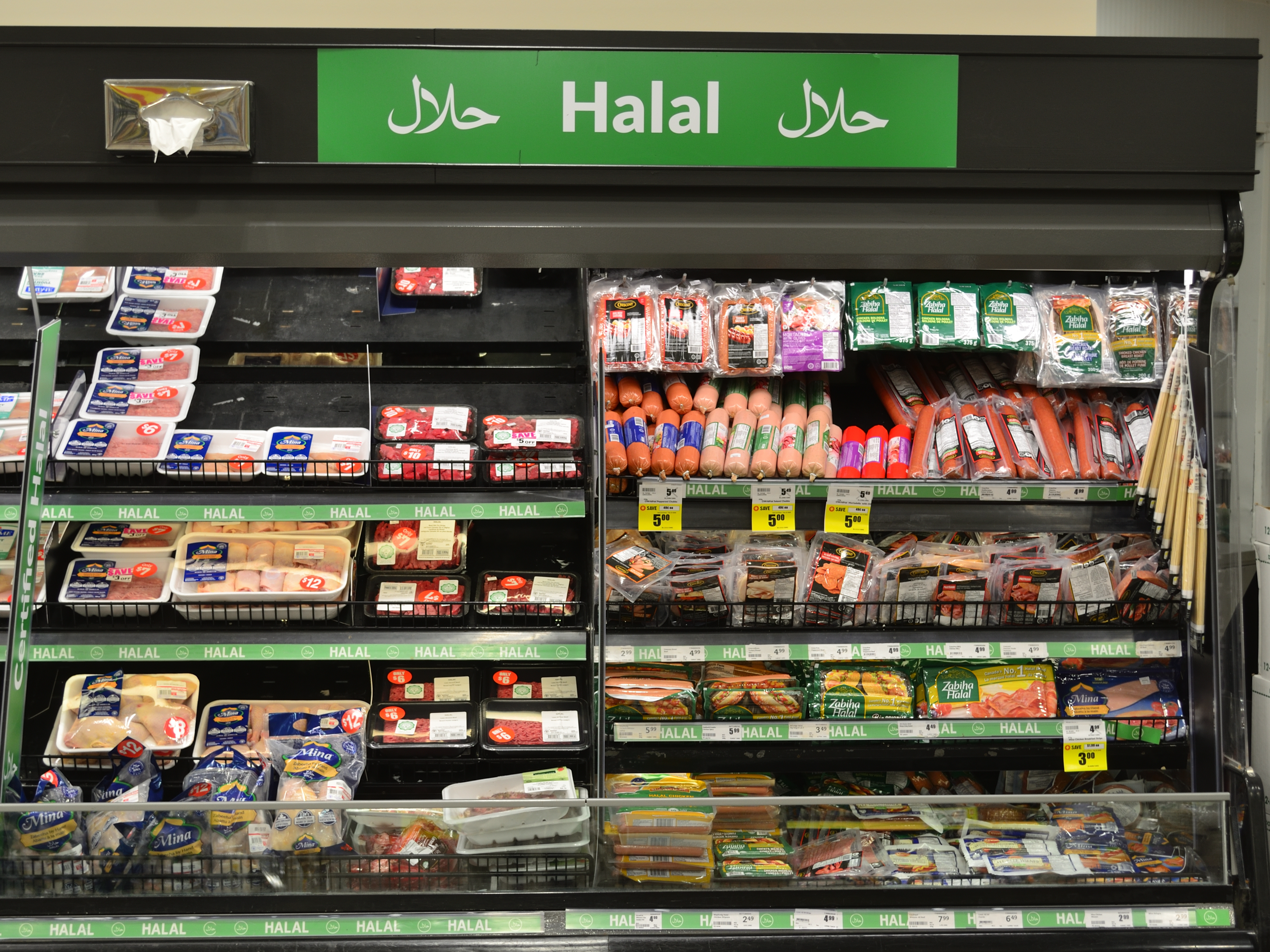
Halal meat section at a grocery store in Richmond Hill, Ontario, Canada

Muslims believe in what they see as the ethical treatment of animals. Halal practices align with this philosophy by promoting kindness, compassion, and humane treatment throughout the entire lifecycle of the animal.

Halal meat must come from a supplier that uses halal practices. Dhabīḥah (ذَبِيْحَة) is the prescribed method of slaughter for all meat sources, excluding fish and other sealife, per Islamic law. This method of slaughtering animals consists of using a sharp knife to make an incision that cuts the front of the throat, oesophagus and jugular veins but not the spinal cord. The head of an animal that is slaughtered using halal methods should be aligned with the qiblah (the direction a Muslim faces when praying). In addition to the direction, permitted animals should be slaughtered upon utterance of the Islamic prayer "Bismillah, Allahu Akbar" (lit. In the name of God, God is greatest).

The slaughter must be performed by a Muslim. Carrion (carcasses of dead animals, such as animals who died in the wild) cannot be eaten. Additionally, an animal that has been strangled, beaten (to death), killed by a fall, gored (to death), savaged by a beast of prey (unless finished off by a human), or sacrificed on a stone altar cannot be eaten.

==== Compatibility with other religions ====
Animals slaughtered by People of the Book (Jews and Christians) can also be considered halal if the slaughter is carried out by jugular slice, the blood drained and the name of Allah invoked. As a result, kosher meat is permitted by some Muslim communities, and is sometimes substituted for halal meat.

Sikhism forbids eating meat from animals that were slaughtered slowly or with religious ritual, referred to as kutha meat. This includes halal meat preparation. The religiously recommended method of slaughter among Sikhs, known as jhatka, is likewise incompatible with halal principles, as with this method not all of the blood is drained from the meat.

==== Concerns for animal welfare ====
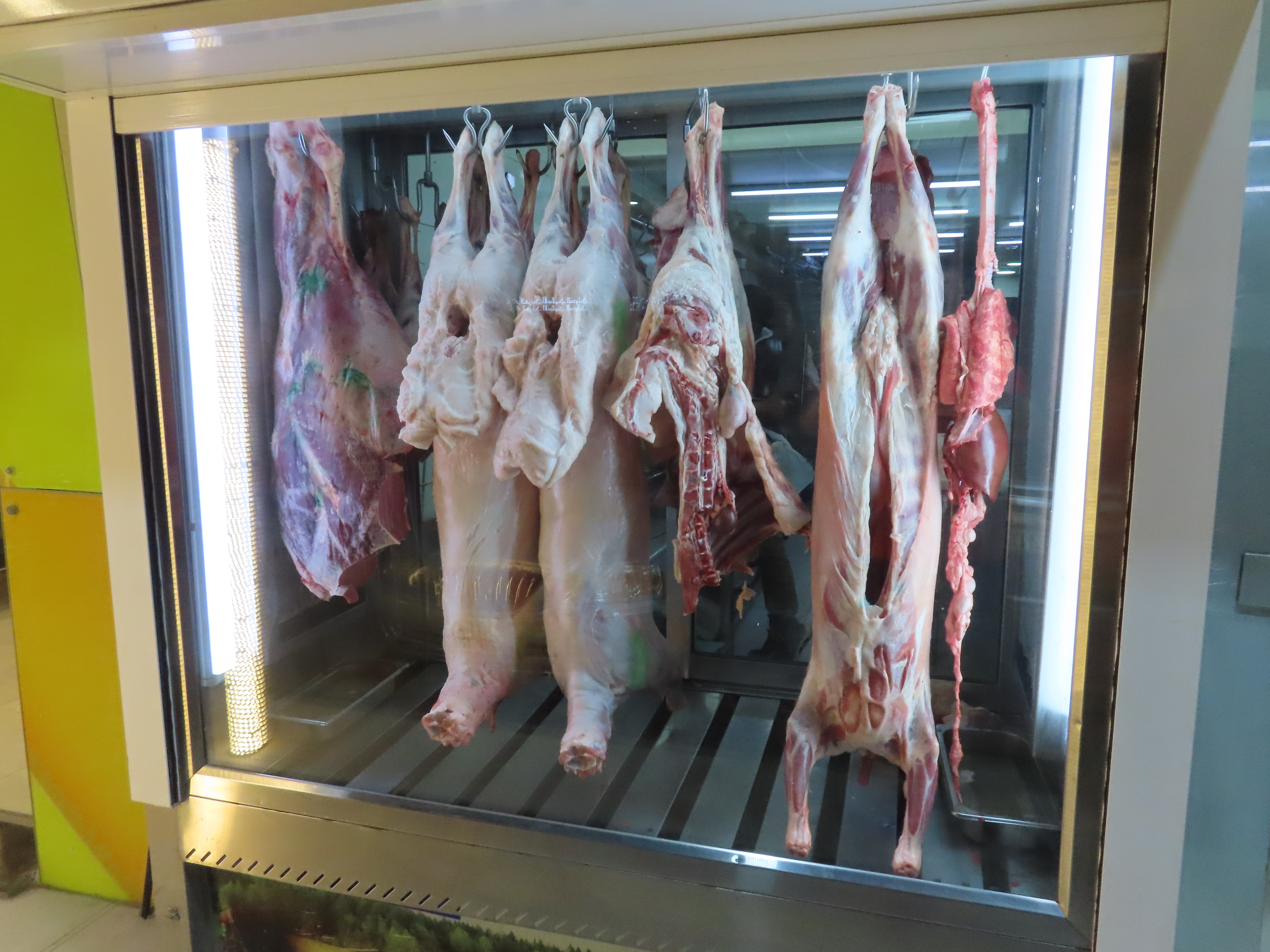
A butcher shop in Amman, Jordan

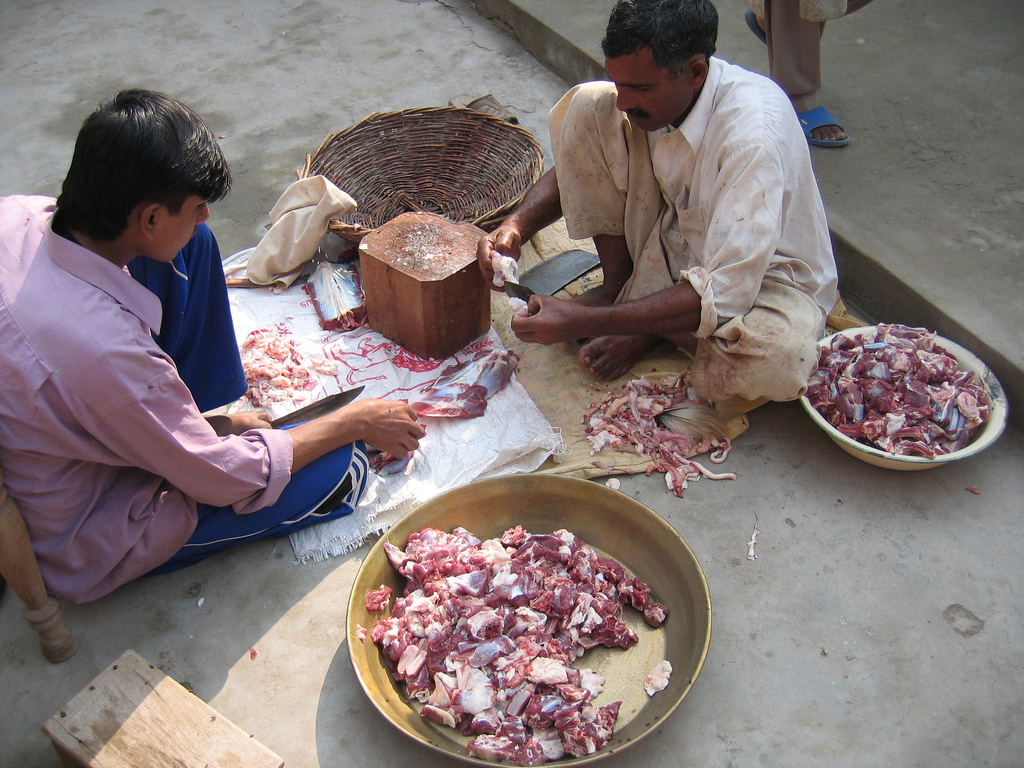
Meat distribution in Pakistan for Eid al-Adha

Stunning of the animal is only permitted if it is necessary to calm down a violent animal. British supermarkets report the use of stunning before slaughter for halal meats. The 2011 UK Food Standards Agency figures suggest that 84% of cattle, 81% of sheep and 88% of chickens slaughtered for halal meat were stunned before they died. Tesco says "the only difference between the halal meat it sells and other meat is that [the animal] was blessed as [it] was killed." The British Veterinary Association, along with citizens who have assembled a petition with 100,000 signatures, have raised concerns regarding a proposed halal abattoir in Wales, in which animals are not to be stunned prior to killing. Concerns about animal suffering from slaughter without prior stunning has resulted in the ban of slaughter of unstunned animals in Denmark, Luxembourg, Belgium, Netherlands, Norway, Sweden and Switzerland.

=== Certification ===
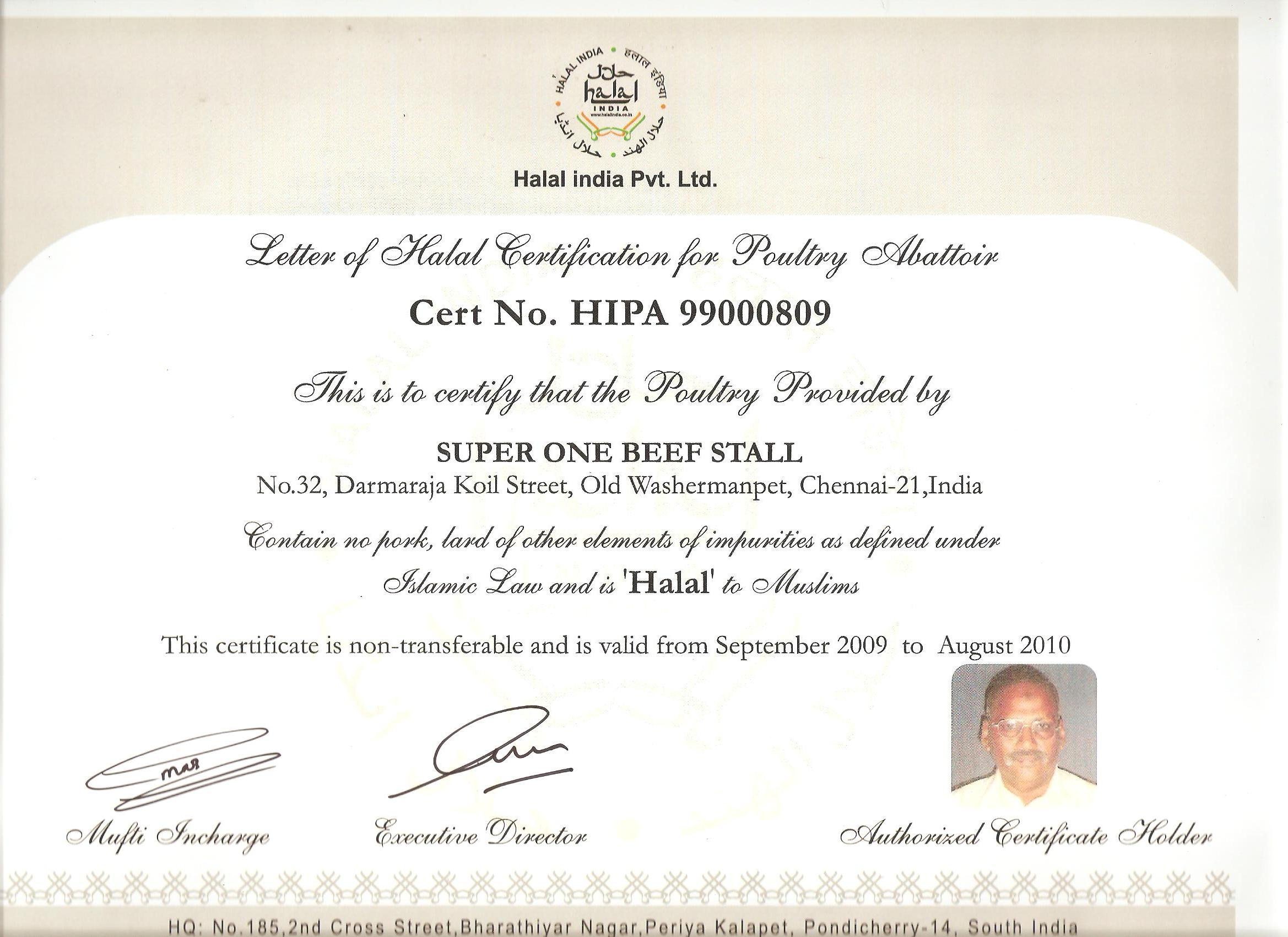
An example of a halal certificate from India

Certification for halal products is given by legal authorities in most Muslim-majority countries, while in other countries, it is voluntarily acquired by companies and issued by non-governmental organizations for an annual fee.

==== Halal certification in the US ====
Halal certifications are provided by a number of agencies in the United States. Depending on how the certification will be used for domestic or international export, the certification may need to be done by a qualified entity. If it is for domestic use a local agency with proper knowledge, training and background can issue a halal certificate. If the certificate is going to be used for export then the halal certifier needs to be accredited by the country the halal product is being exported to. A company that needs to certify its product must do their due diligence when hiring a certifier. There are a number of halal certifiers in the US, including ISWA Halal; ISA Halal; Halal Monitoring Services (HMS), based out of Chicago, Illinois; the Halal Food Standards Alliance of America (HFSAA), based out of Oakland, California; and Halal Watch World, based in New York. Another agency that can help companies identify and screen the proper halal certifier is the US Halal Consultants based in Fairfax, Virginia.

==== Criticism ====
In Australia, halal food certification has been criticized by groups who claim that certifying foods as halal leads to consumers subsidizing a particular religious belief. Australian Federation of Islamic Councils spokesman Keysar Trad told a journalist in July 2014 that this was an attempt to exploit anti-Muslim sentiments in Australia. A study in 2022 showed that halal certifications did not necessarily reflect the extent to which a halal product came about in whole, and called for greater means of assurance and transparent qualitative methods of halal certification.

=== Business ===
The Dubai Chamber of Commerce and Industry estimated the global industry value of halal food consumer purchases to be $1.1 trillion in 2013, accounting for 16.6 percent of the global food and beverage market, with an annual growth of 6.9 percent. Growth regions include Indonesia ($197 million market value in 2012) and Turkey ($100 million). The European Union market for halal food has an estimated annual growth of around 15 percent and is worth an estimated $30 billion, approximately $8 billion of which are accounted for in France.

The halal food and beverage industry has also made a significant impact on supermarkets and other food business such as restaurants. French supermarkets had halal food sales totalling $210 million in 2011, a 10.5% growth from five years prior. In France, the market for halal foods is even larger than the market for other types of common foods. For example, in 2010, the market for halal foods and beverages in France was nearly twice that of organic foods. Auchan, a large French supermarket chain, now sells 80 certified halal meat products, along with 30 pre-cooked halal meals and 40 frozen halal products. Upscale restaurants and catering services have also added halal foods to their menus. In addition, many beverage companies such as Evian have taken the effort to add a halal stamp on their products to show that their water and other beverages are pure and not haram or forbidden under Islamic law.

=== Interaction with global regulation ===
Halal standards and regulations have been considered as an obstacle to international trade while the discrimination towards import products also lacks transparency. Trade disputes related to halal have emerged even among Muslim and Islamic countries, for instance at the regional level within the ASEAN.

==== European Union ====
On 17 December 2020, the Court of Justice of the European Union ruled that member countries may ban religious slaughter to promote animal welfare and could impose non-lethal stunning before the killing of animals. The ruling was in response to a challenge to a 2017 Flemish government prohibition on the killing of animals without prior non-lethal (also called reversible) stunning by Jewish and Muslim associations.

==== India ====
The Muslim community has been receptive of halal food and certification. Members of the right-wing Hindutva groups in India have protested against the sale of Halal food in India. Bajrang Dal, Vishva Hindu Parishad and other Hindutva groups have run door to door campaigns in the state of Karnataka, asking people not to purchase halal meat. In March 2022 the Hindutva group Bajrang Dal physically attacked a Muslim meat seller, five persons were arrested in the incident. In March 2022, C. T. Ravi, national general secretary for the ruling Bharatiya Janata Party, referred to halal food as "economic jihad".

==== United Kingdom ====
As of August 2012, an estimated 27 UK Tesco supermarkets, in addition to most urban Asda and many Morrisons supermarkets, had halal meat counters, selling meat approved for consumption by Muslims. According to the Food Standards Agency Animal Welfare Update report, published September 2017, 16 percent of animals slaughtered by the halal method were not stunned before slaughter, which violates RSPCA standards on animal welfare. However, it is legal in the UK due to an exemption in the law granted to Jews and Muslims.

== Non-food applications ==
In addition to food and diet, a halal lifestyle can include travel, finance, clothing, media, recreation, cosmetics. A halal lifestyle can even involve professional practises ranging from industrial and manufacturing logistics to supply chains.

=== Pharmaceuticals ===
Some Muslims refrain from using pharmaceuticals that are not halal. This distinction is most noticeably practiced in Malaysia, which has a large halal pharmaceutical industry, complete with government regulations to make sure the products are tayyib. On the other hand, the Quran obliges Muslims to seek treatment, including preventive ones, for diseases regardless of what the care provider believes in. In particular, medicines containing animal products like gelatin have been deemed permissible by a 1995 council of Islamic jurisprudence, making such distinction unnecessary. The decentralized nature of Islam allows both opinions to exist.

=== Vaccines ===
The controversy over pharmaceuticals has led to the refusal of childhood vaccination in some Muslim-majority countries, despite many religious leaders expressly endorsing vaccination. It is also a concern in the rollout of the COVID-19 vaccine.

=== Personal care ===
Feminine hygiene products and nappies have been certified as halal in Malaysia. Such certification is not required by the religion, nor is there a demand from Muslims. Critics consider such "unnecessary" certification as little more than a marketing gimmick, e.g., halal labels on clearly vegetarian soft drinks or naturally grown food items like cereals, pulses, vegetables and processed foods made exclusively from vegetable products.

== See also ==
- Islamic ethics
- Al-Jami'a, a Shi'a text which contains all the details of halal things.
- Istihlal
- Halal certification in Australia
- Halal certification in Europe
- Halal certification in India
- Halal certification in the Philippines
- Food and drink prohibitions
- Kashrut (Jewish dietary laws)
- Christian dietary laws
- Scottish pork taboo
