= Guion =

Guion may refer to:

- Guion (name), a given name and surname (including a list of persons with the name)
- Guion, Ethiopia
- United States:
  - Guion, Arkansas
  - Guion, Indiana

== See also ==
- Guion Line, a British passenger ship line
- Gwion (disambiguation)
