= Emil Dill =

Swiss painter (1861–1938)

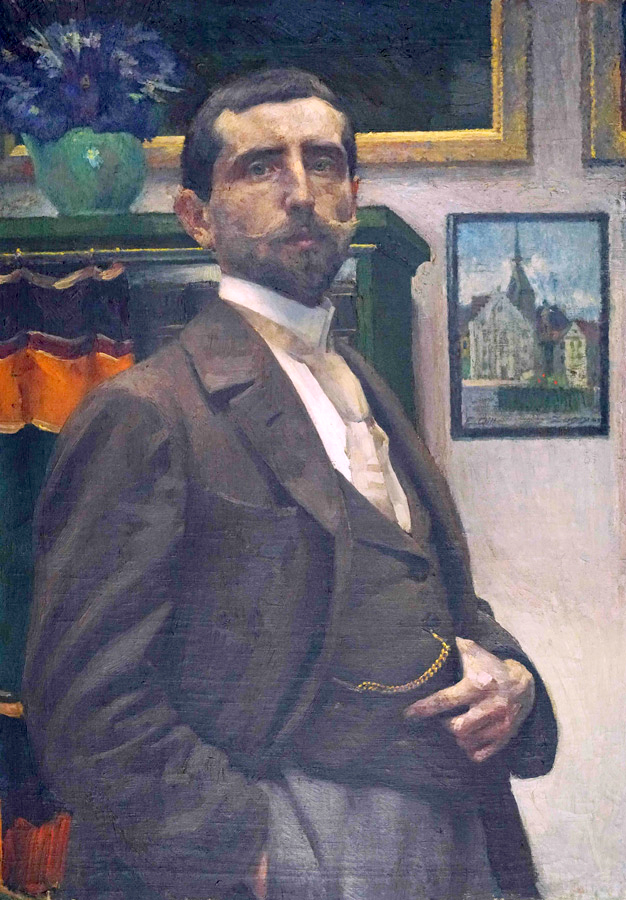
Self-portrait (1901)

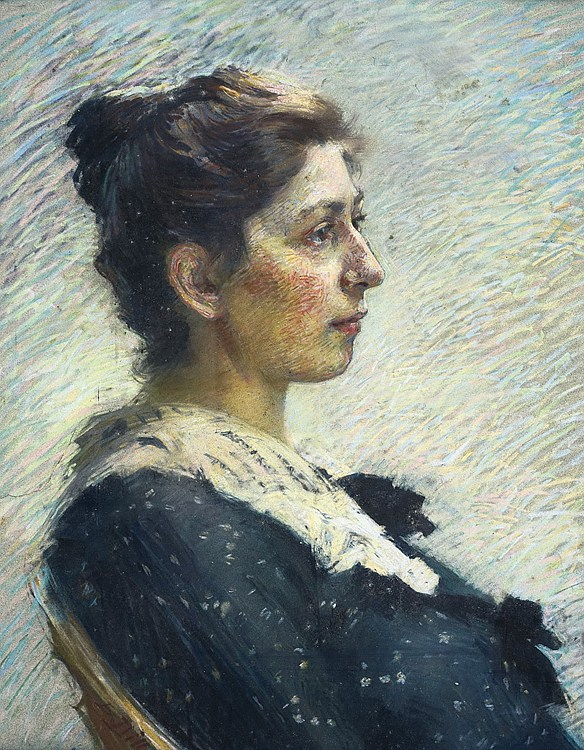
Portrait of his wife, Marie (1902)

Emil Dill (15 April 1861, Pratteln - 23 May 1938, Liestal) was a Swiss painter, watercolorist and art teacher.

== Biography ==
He was born to Martin Dill, a merchant, and his wife Katharina née Stohler. He began his training in 1877 at the Gewerbeschule (a type of trade school) in Basel. The following year, he learned pattern drawing at Baur & Sohn, a strap and ribbon manufacturer, headquartered in Wuppertal. While there, Fritz Schider, a local drawing teacher, noticed his talent. From 1881 to 1883, he studied at the State Academy of Fine Arts Stuttgart, then transferred to the Academy of Fine Arts, Karlsruhe, where he studied with Ferdinand Keller.

In 1885, he and his friend, Emil Beurmann, set out for Paris to enroll at the Académie Julian, where they planned to study with William-Adolphe Bouguereau and Tony Robert-Fleury. On the advice of Lovis Corinth, Dill continued his education at the Academy of Fine Arts, Munich, where he worked with Ludwig von Löfftz. He was there from 1887 to 1888. He became an illustrator for the Nebelspalter, a satirical magazine, in 1890.

After a stay in Basel, he returned to Munich in 1892, where he studied architecture and structural engineering at the Königlich Bayerischen Technischen Hochschule. Two years later, he and his friend, Albert Fierz (1861-1913), opened an art school in Zürich, but a year later he obtained a professorship at the gymnasium in Zug. He taught drawing, calligraphy and mathematics there until 1935, when he resigned.

In 1897, he married Marie Bohny, who often served as his model. They had two daughters. He became a member of the "Künstlervereinigung Zürich" (an artists' association) in 1901 and, in 1902, was awarded a gold medal at the Glaspalast in Munich. From 1903 to 1906, he wrote and published a treatise On the Development of the Fine Arts.

In 1937, he and his family moved to Liestal, where he died the following year.
