= Guyon =

Guyon is a French surname.

== Geographical distribution ==
As of 2014, 85.7% of all known bearers of the surname Guyon were residents of France (frequency 1:4,367), 4.8% of the United States (1:427,011), 2.4% of Canada (1:87,614), 1.7% of the Philippines (1:327,626) and 1.1% of Gabon (1:9,351).

In France, the frequency of the surname was higher than national average (1:4,367) in the following regions:

1. Bourgogne-Franche-Comté (1:1,012)
2. Pays de la Loire (1:1,802)
3. Centre-Val de Loire (1:2,925)
4. Brittany (1:3,370)
5. Auvergne-Rhône-Alpes (1:3,951)
6. Corsica (1:4,330)

== People ==
- Adrien Guyon (1866–?), French Olympic fencer
- Alexandre Guyon (1829–1905), French actor
- Isabelle Guyon (born 1961), French-born researcher in machine learning
- James Guyon Jr. (1778–1846), politician and cavalry officer from Staten Island, New York
- Jean Guyon du Buisson (1592–1663), master mason and early settler of Quebec, Canada
- Jean Casimir Félix Guyon (1831–1920), French urologist at the University of Paris
- Jean-Jacques Guyon (1932–2017), French Olympic equestrian
- Jeanne Guyon (1648–1717), French Christian mystic
- Joe Guyon (1892–1971), American professional football player and coach
- Lionel Guyon, French Olympic equestrian
- Marie-Therese Guyon Cadillac (1671–1746), early settler of Detroit, Michigan
- Maxime Guyon (born 1989), French jockey
- Maximilienne Guyon (1868–1903), French painter and illustrator
- Olivier Guyon (born 1975), French-American astronomer
- Pascal Guyon, French musician
- René Guyon (1876–1963), French jurist and sexual ethicist
- Richard Guyon (1813–1856), general in the Hungarian revolutionary army
- Sir Guyon, fictional hero in Edmund Spencer's The Faerie Queene (1590)

== See also ==
- Guion (name), a variant spelling
