= Jules-Cyrille Cavé =

French painter (1859–1949)

Jules-Cyrille Cavé (4 January 1859 – 12 May 1949) was a French academic painter.

== Life ==
Jules-Cyrille Cavé was born in Paris. He studied with Tony Robert-Fleury, a painter of the historical genre and professor at the Académie Julian, and with William-Adolphe Bouguereau, one of the best-known salon painters of the 19th century. Bouguereau was to be a significant influence throughout Cavé's career, both stylistically and in terms of subject matter and treatment.

Since 1885, Cavé took part in the Paris Salon every year. He mainly exhibited floral and portrait pieces as well as historical compositions, of which Martyre aux catacombes (1886), Première gelée (1891), Moisson de fleurs (1899), Fleurs des Champs (1905), and two portraits of women (1909) can be proven. Cavé had early success in 1886 when he was awarded a 3rd class medal for Martyre aux catacombes. From 1887 he was a member of the Société des Artistes Français and the Comité de l'Association Taylor. He received further awards and bronze medals in 1889 and 1900. He painted portraits, religious and allegorical motifs, young girls, genre, and still lifes. Cavé's portraits of young girls and allegorical motifs were painted in Bouguereau's manner and found success in France and the United States.

== Gallery ==
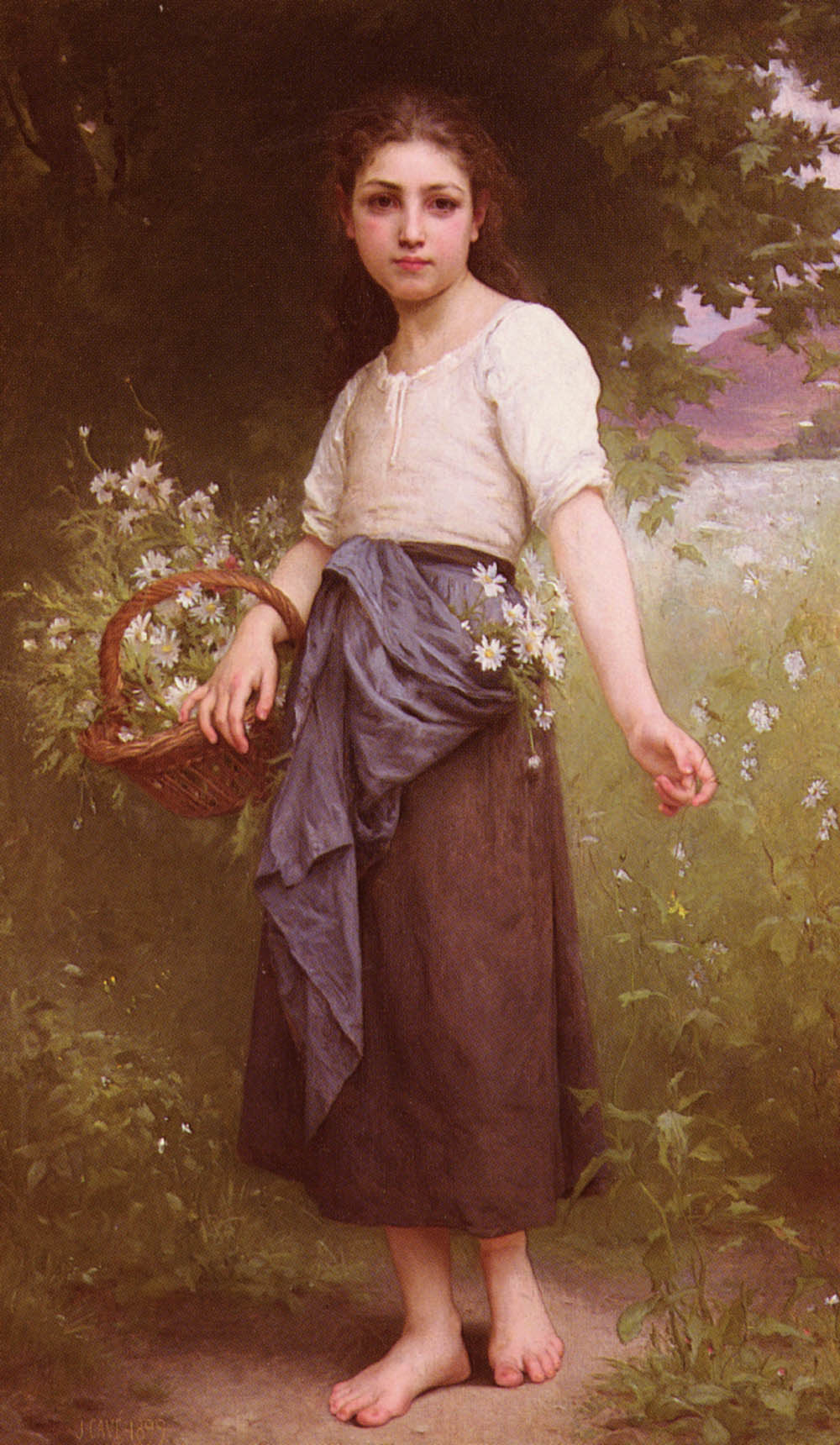
Picking Daisies, 1899

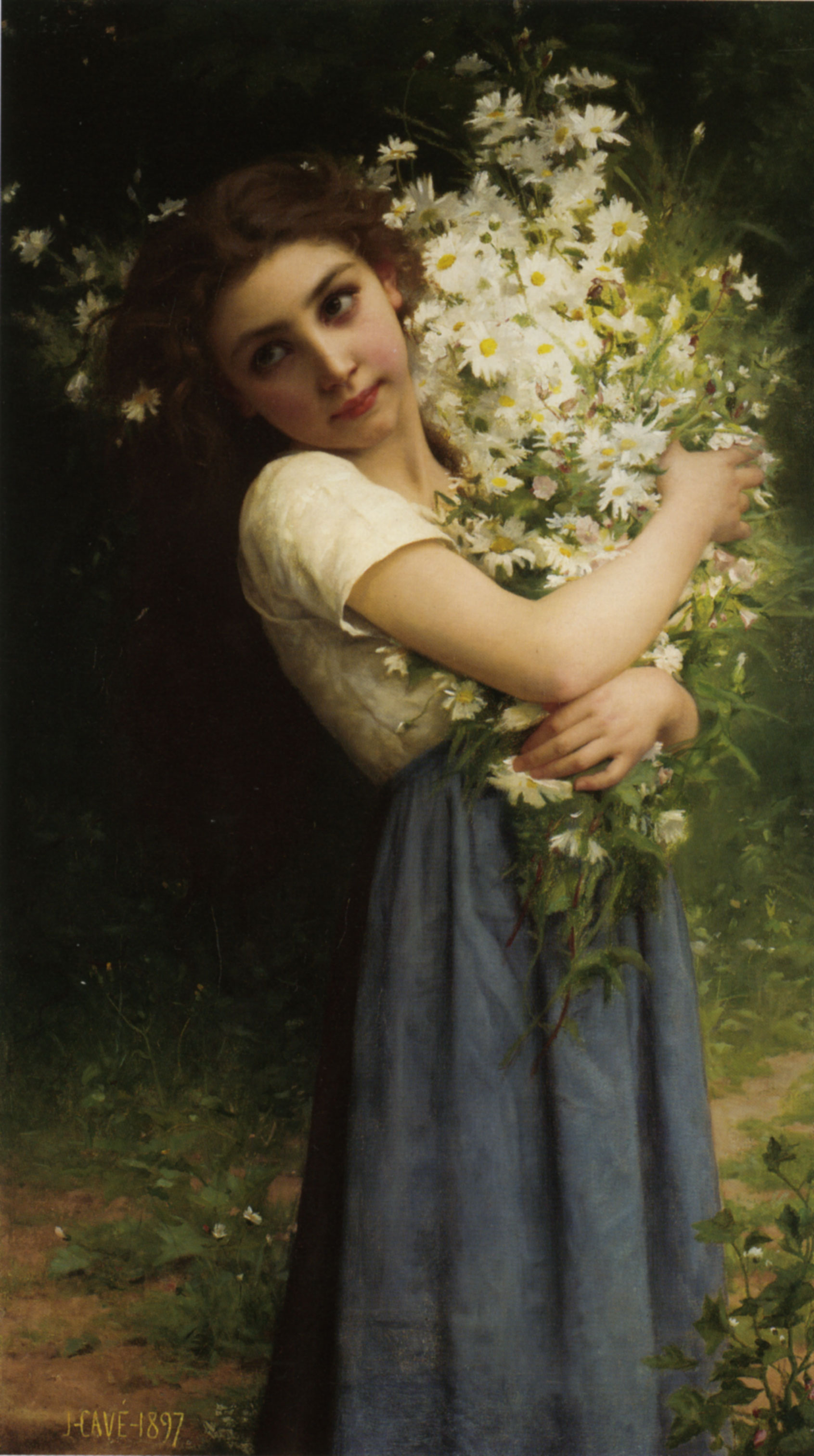
The Flower Girl, 1897

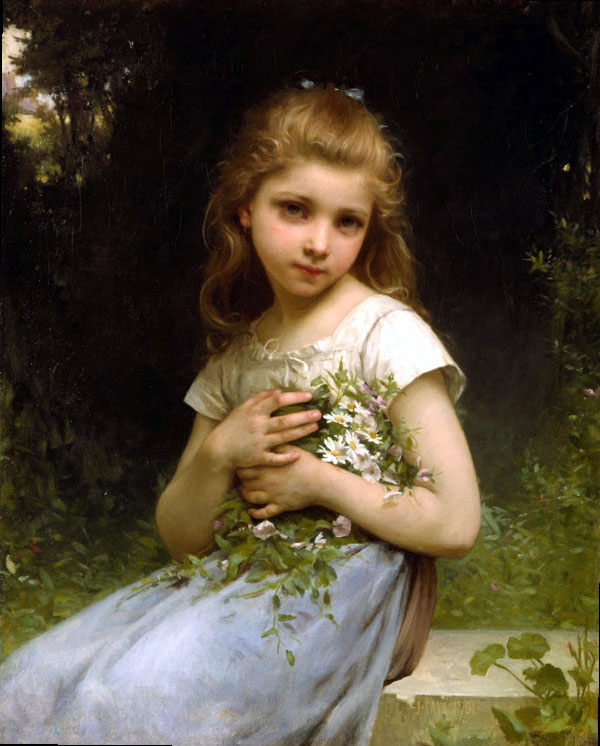
My Daisies, 1901

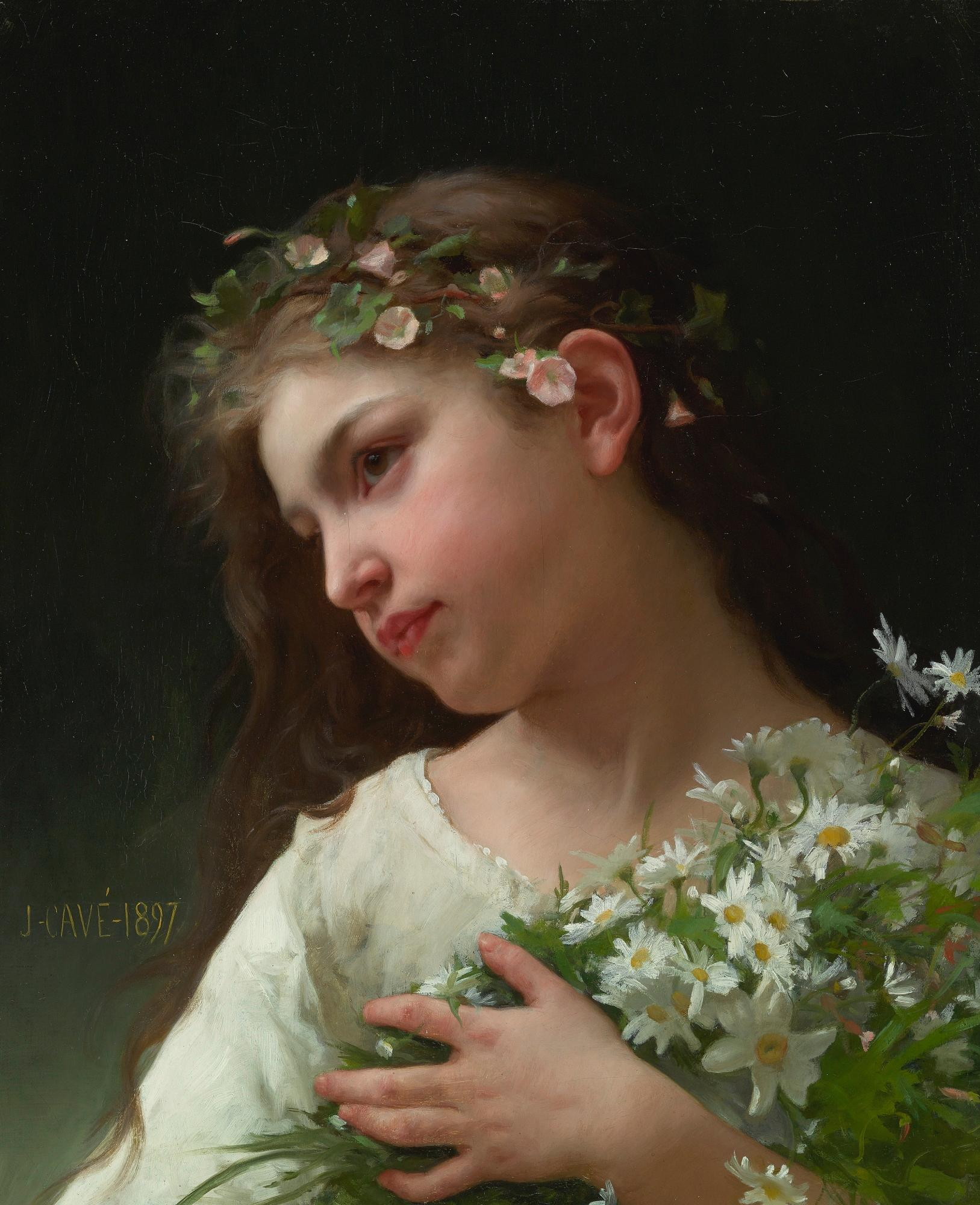
Girl with a Bouquet of Daisies, 1897
