= Tony Robert-Fleury =

French painter (1837–1911)

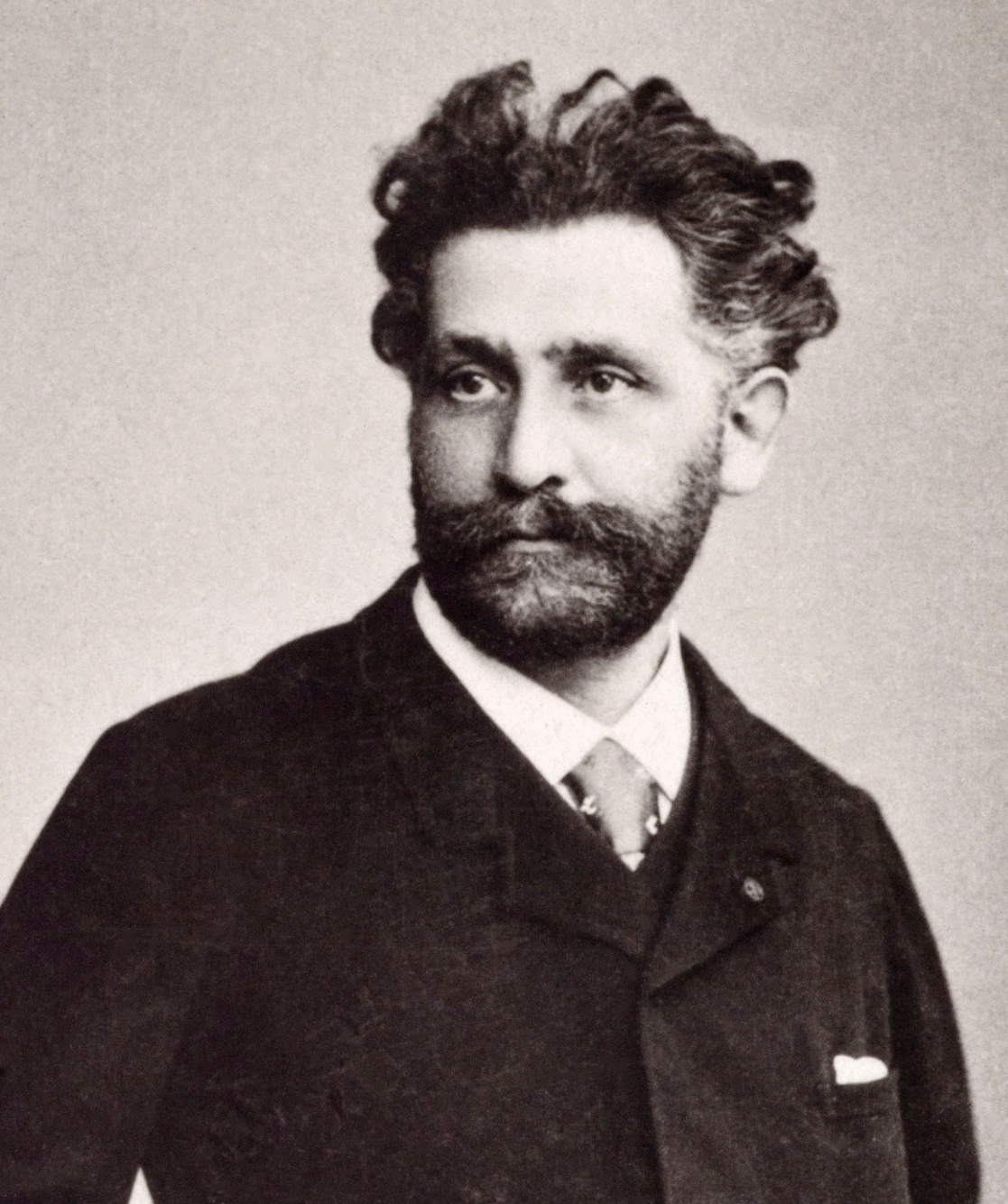
- Photograph by Franz Benque
- Born: 1 September 1837; Paris, France
- Died: 8 December 1911 (aged 74); Paris, France
- Known for: Painting

Tony Robert-Fleury (1 September 1837 – 8 December 1911) was a French painter, known primarily for historical scenes. He was also a prominent art teacher, with many famous artists among his students.

== Biography ==
He was born just outside Paris, and studied under his father Joseph-Nicolas Robert-Fleury and under Paul Delaroche and Léon Cogniet at the École des Beaux-Arts (School of Fine Arts) in Paris.

His first painting at the Salon de Paris, in 1866, was a large historical canvas, titled Varsovie, Scène de l'Insurrection Polonaise, recalling the events of 8 April 1861 in Warsaw, when Russian troops quenched riots by force. In the following year, his "Old Women in the Place Navone, Rome" was purchased by the Musée du Luxembourg.

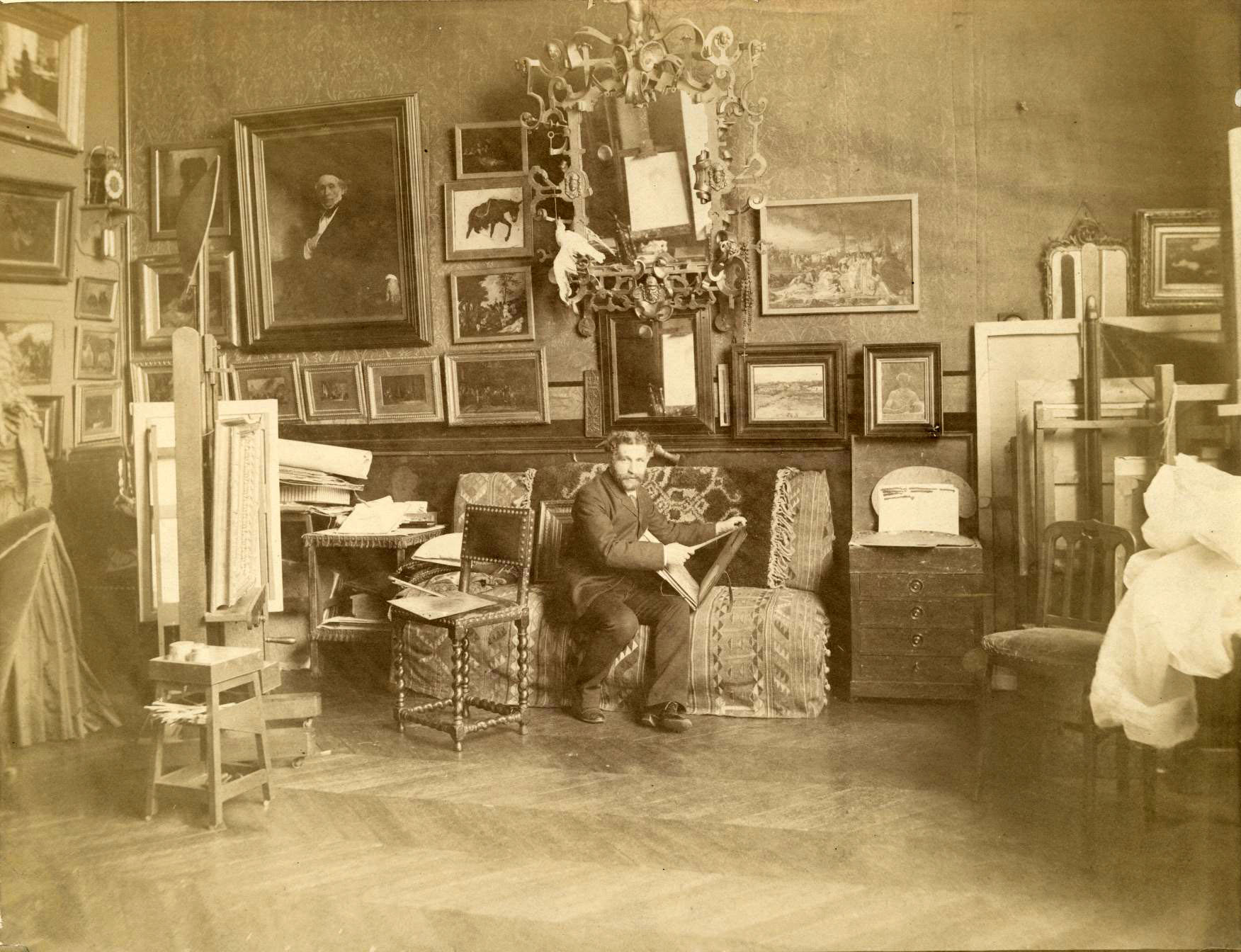
Robert-Fleury in his studio, from the Frick Collection

In 1870, he painted a canvas of Le Dernier Jour de Corinthe (Last Day of Corinth), which depicted the last day before the Roman legions looted and burned the ancient Greek city, according to Livy. This painting was also purchased by the Musée du Luxembourg, and is now on display at the Musée d'Orsay. In 1880, he painted a ceiling for the Luxembourg Palace in Paris, representing "The Glorification of French Sculpture."

Robert-Fleury painted Pinel a la Salpêtrière (1876), which depicts the famed Father of Modern Psychiatry among the inmates of the asylum. Philippe Pinel had been named chief doctor at the asylum in 1795, and had instituted more charitable and rational treatments.

In 1875, Robert-Fleury painted Charlotte Corday at Caen, which shows the woman coming to the conclusion that Marat needed to be murdered. In 1882, he painted Vauban donnant le plan des fortifications de Belfort where the celebrated engineer is represented in Louis XIV costume reviewing maps and designs, while in the background laborers are building.

Robert-Fleury taught as a professor for many years at the Académie Julian in Paris.

Robert-Fleury became president of the Société des artistes français in succession to Bouguereau. He was honoured with Commander of the Legion of Honour in 1907. In 1908, he was elected president of the Taylor Foundation, a position he held until the end of his life. He acquired a great reputation and is renowned for his historical compositions, portraits and genre scenes; at his atelier he taught several well-known painters of the late 19th and early 20th centuries from various countries, including Lovis Corinth, Édouard Vuillard, Louise-Cécile Descamps-Sabouret and Sir George Clausen.

== Gallery ==
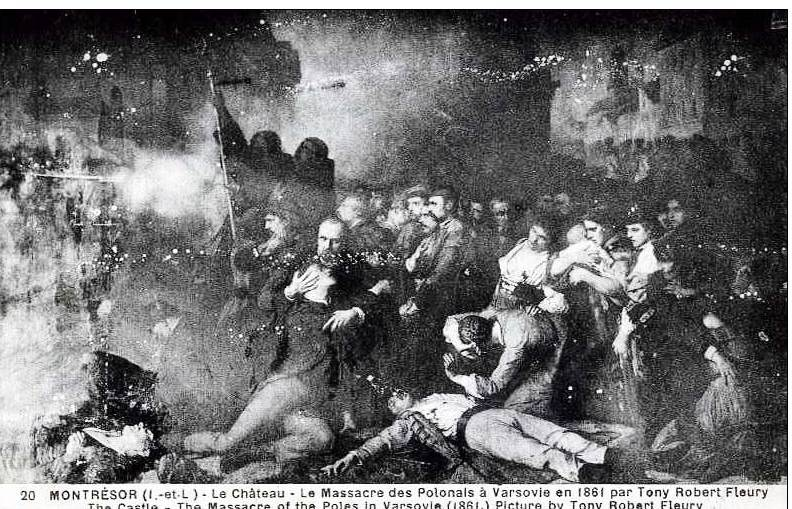
Varsovie, Scene de l'Insurrection polonaise

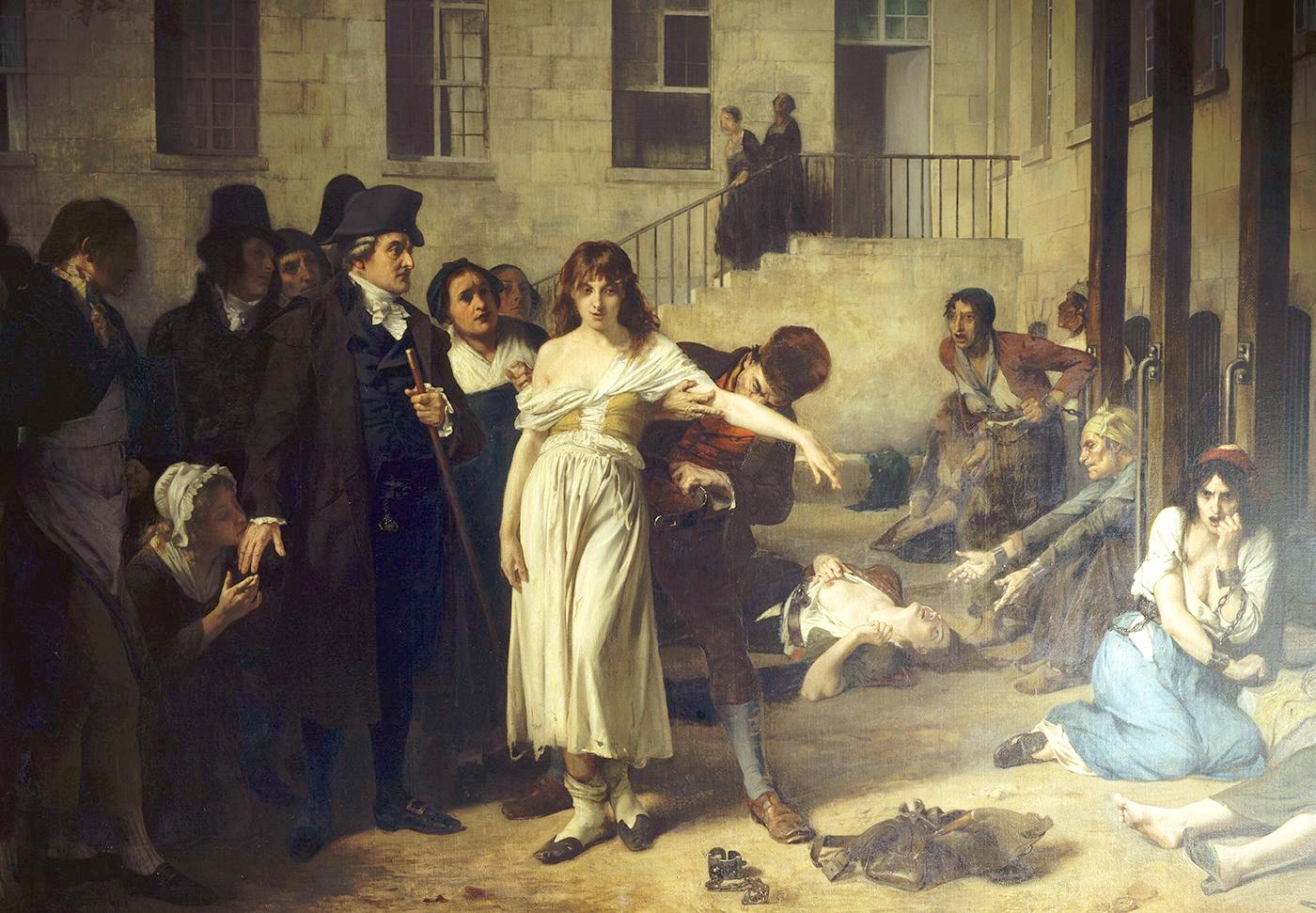
Pinel at the Salpêtrière. Pinel orders removal of chains from patients at Paris Asylum for insane women.

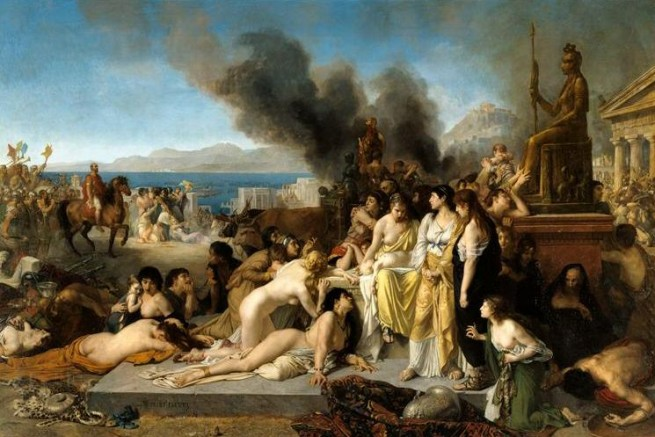
Le Dernier Jour de Corinthe, 1870

== Pupils ==
Some of Robert-Fleury's more prominent pupils were:

- Louis Abel-Truchet
- Jules Adler
- Cuno Amiet
- Amélie Beaury-Saurel
- Emmanuel Michel Benner
- Marie Bashkirtseff
- Anna Bilińska-Bohdanowicz
- Corrie Boellaard
- Franklin Brownell
- fr:Édouard Cabane
- Blanche-Augustine Camus
- Jules-Cyrille Cavé
- Maurice Chabas
- George Clausen
- Lovis Corinth
- Jean Crotti
- Louis-Marie Désiré-Lucas
- Emil Dill
- Etienne Dinet
- Édouard Doigneau
- Jean-Gabriel Domergue
- Carl Dørnberger
- Alex Federley
- Claude Ferval
- André des Gachons
- Orazio Gaigher
- Karl Gampenrieder
- Maria Gażycz
- Maximilienne Guyon
- Otto Hamel
- Édouard Henry-Baudot
- René Charles Edmond His
- Phoebe Davis Natt
- Otis Oldfield
- Ker Xavier Roussel
- Guillaume Seignac
- André Suréda
- Henry Valensi
- Édouard Vuillard
- Herbert Ward
- Wilbur Winfield Woodward
- Viktor Zarubin
