= Gwion (disambiguation) =

Gwion, or Taliesin, was an early Brythonic poet of Sub-Roman Britain.

Gwion may also refer to:

- Gwion Edwards (born 1993), Welsh footballer
- Gwion Hallam, Welsh writer and television presenter

== See also ==
- Gwion Gwion, a rock art tradition of Australia
- Guion (disambiguation)
- Gweon, alternative spelling of the Korean name Kwon
