= Viktor Zarubin =

Russian painter

- Виктор Иванович Зарубин
- Born: November 13, 1866; Kharkiv
- Died: November 5, 1928 (aged 61); Saint Petersburg
- Education: Member Academy of Arts (1909)
- Alma mater: Higher Art School (1898)
- Known for: Painting

Viktor Ivanovich Zarubin (Ukrainian: Віктор Іванович Зарубін; Russian: Виктор Иванович Зарубин; 13 November 1866, Kharkiv – 5 November 1928, Saint Petersburg) was a Ukrainian and Russian painter and scenographer. Most of his works are landscapes with figures.

== Biography ==
His father was a professor. Upon completing his basic education at the local gymnasium, he enrolled at the University of Kharkiv where, at the urging of his parents, he graduated from the physics and mathematics department in 1893. During those years, he also worked part-time for the "Казённая палата" (Treasury Chamber), an agency of the Ministry of Finance.

Immediately after graduation, he resigned his position there and ran away with his fiancée to study art in Paris. He was at the Académie Julian for three years; studying with Jules Lefebvre and Tony Robert-Fleury and held his first small exhibition in 1896.

He then moved to Saint Petersburg, where he was admitted to the Imperial Academy of Arts and studied with Arkhip Kuindzhi. From 1897, he participated in the annual exhibitions there and, in 1898, was named an "Artist, First Degree" for his painting "The House of God". In 1909, he was promoted to "Academician".

After 1917, he helped design Revolutionary events and festivities, organized art shows, and illustrated children's books. He also participated in the last few exhibitions of the Peredvizhniki and, in 1925, became a member of "AKhRR". Over the last decade of his life, he was a regular exhibitor at the numerous state-sponsored art events that came and went as the various factions in the government sorted themselves out. He was especially successful at the "Jubilee Exhibition of Theatrical and Decorative Art" in 1927.

His works may be seen in museums throughout Russia, Ukraine, Belarus and also at the Belvedere Palace in Vienna.

== Selected paintings ==
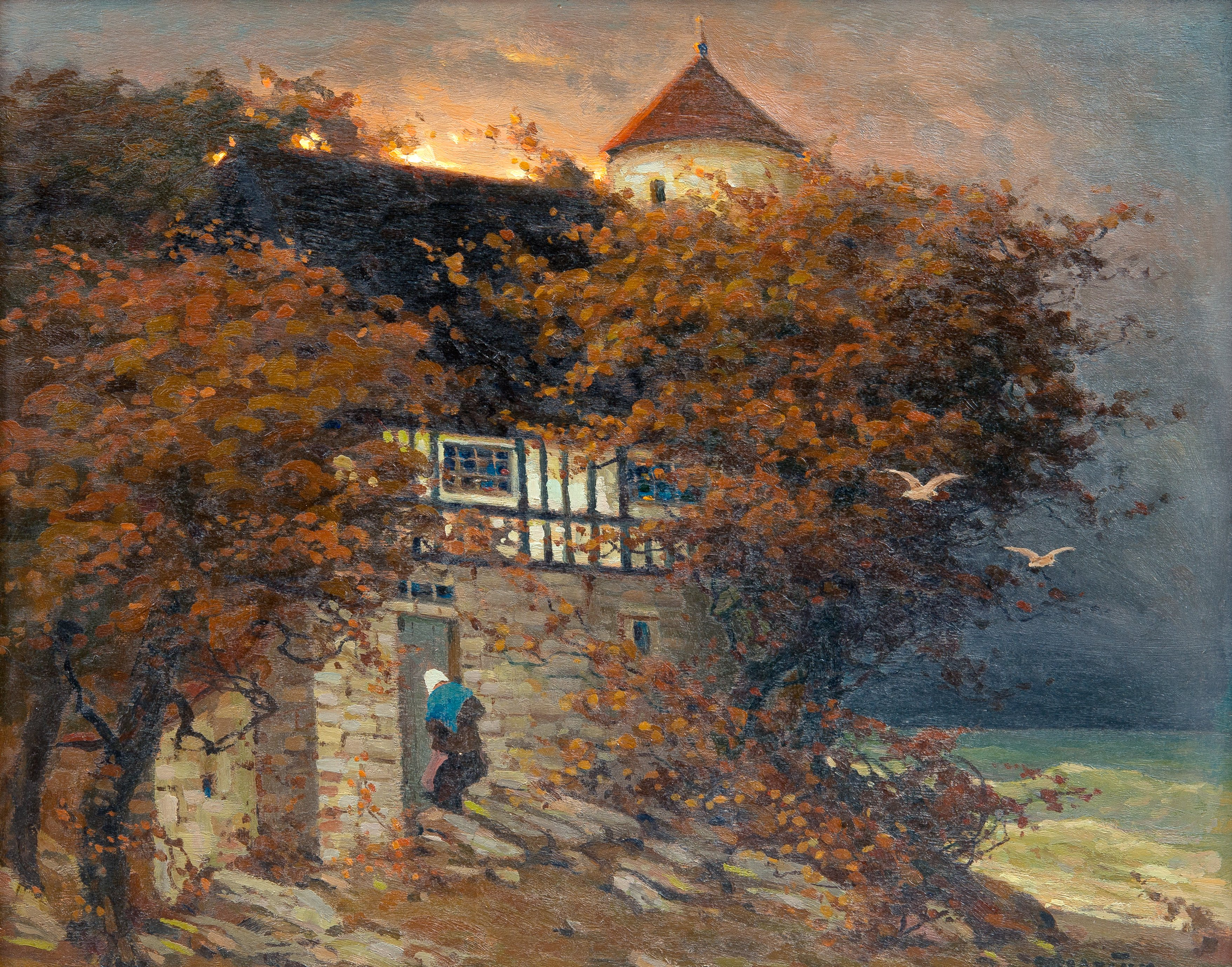
At Dusk

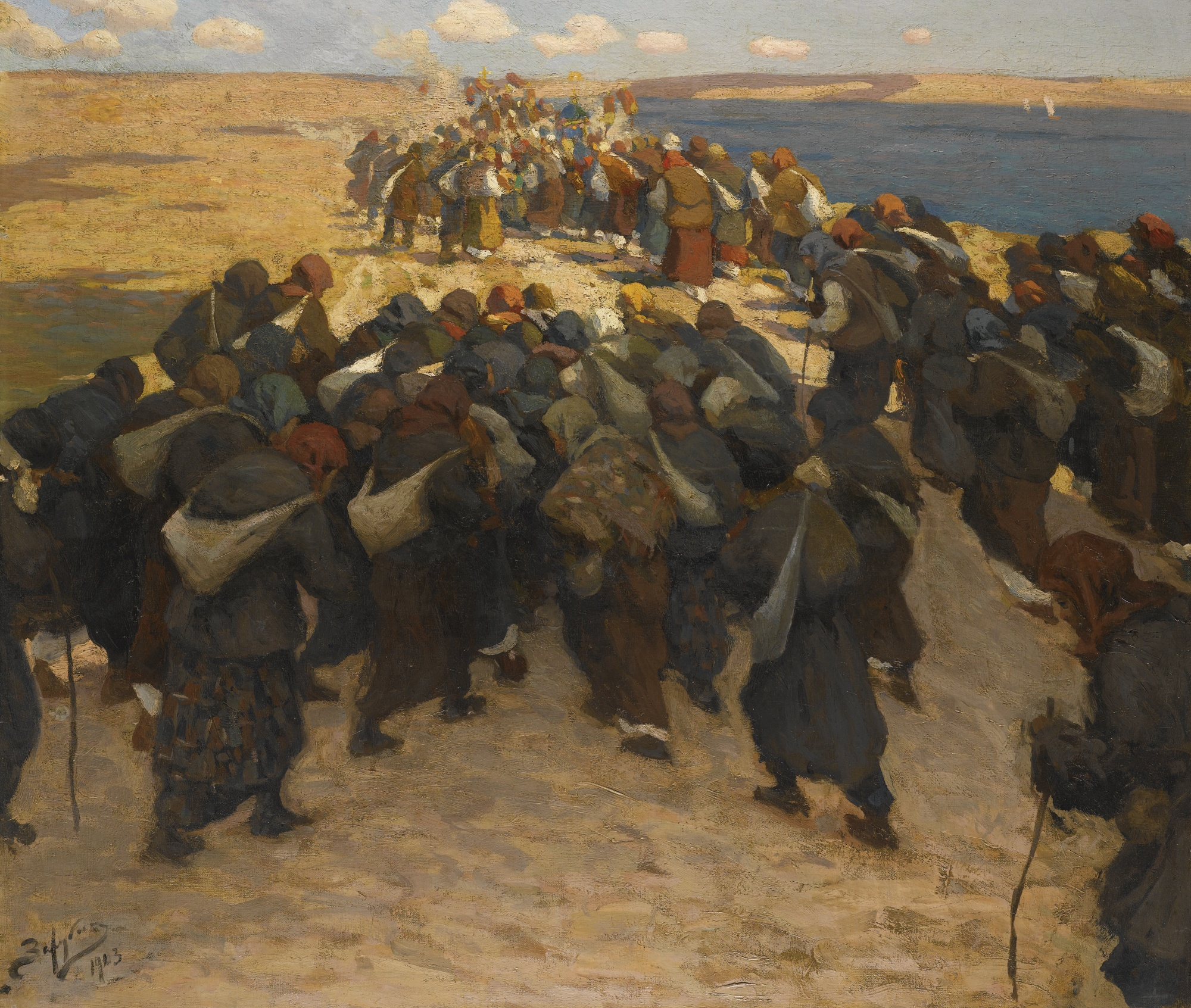
Crowd of pilgrims (1903)

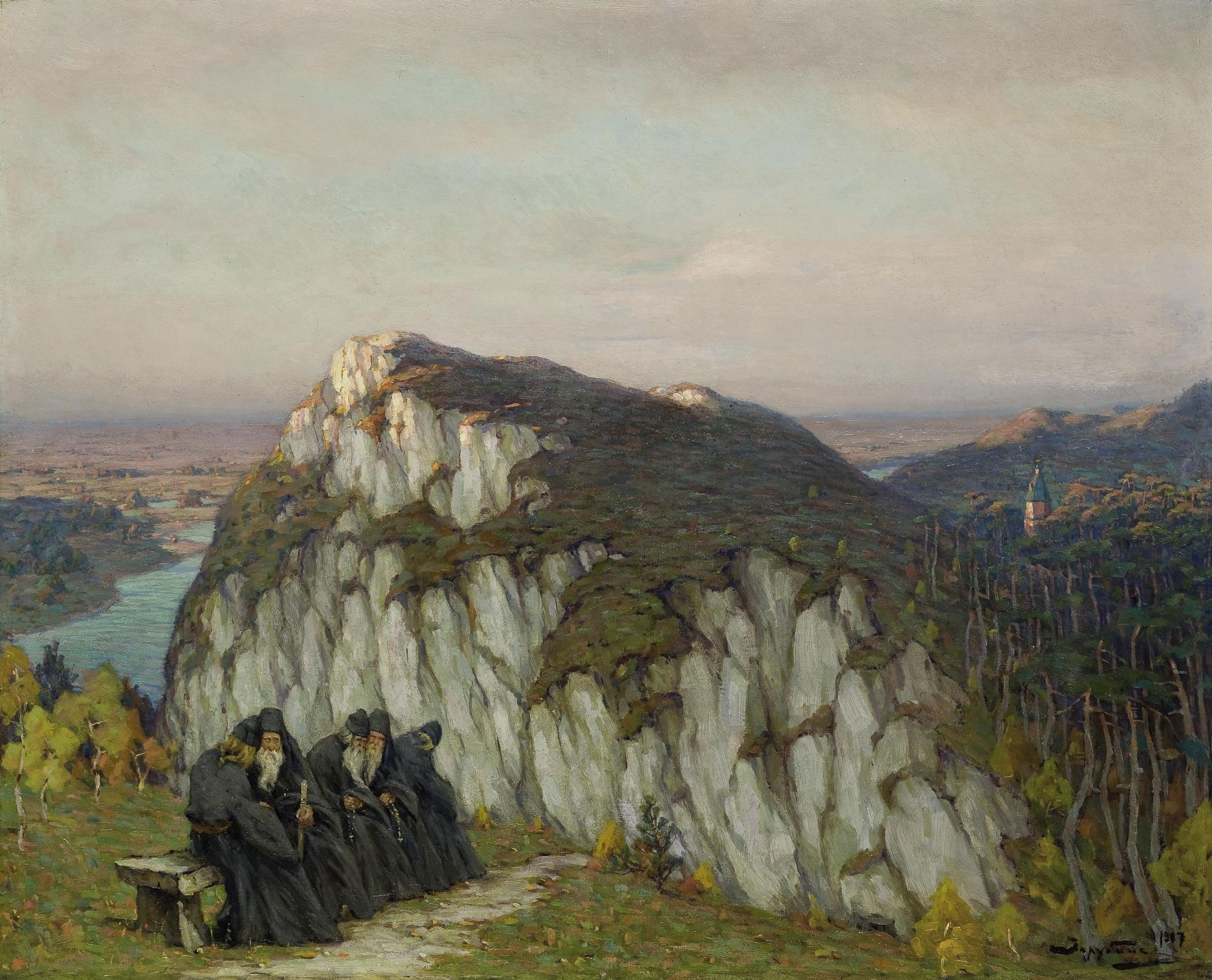
The Voice of Silence (1907)

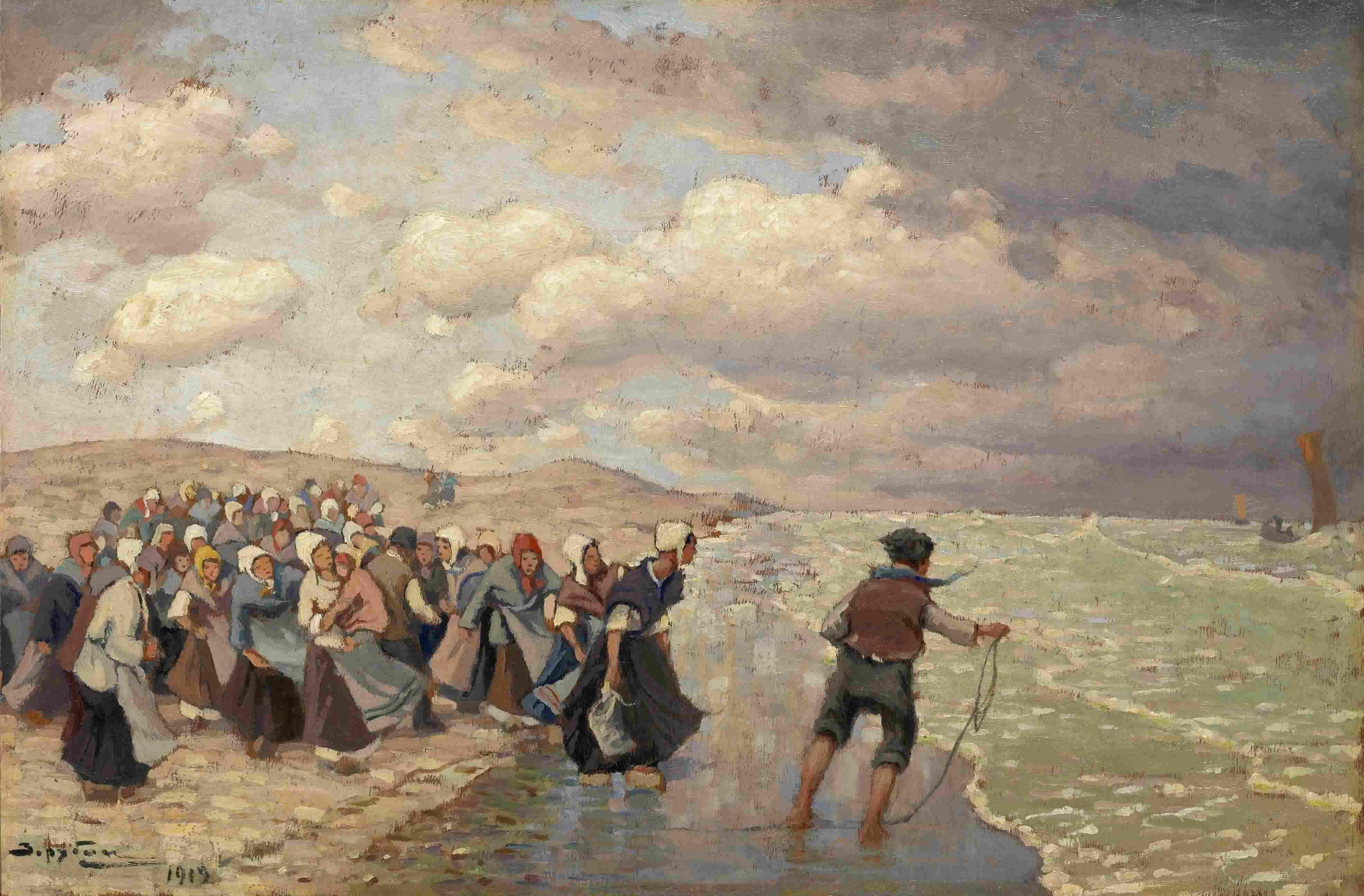
Fishermen's wives (1919)
