= Corrie Boellaard =

Dutch painter and graphic artist (1869–1934)

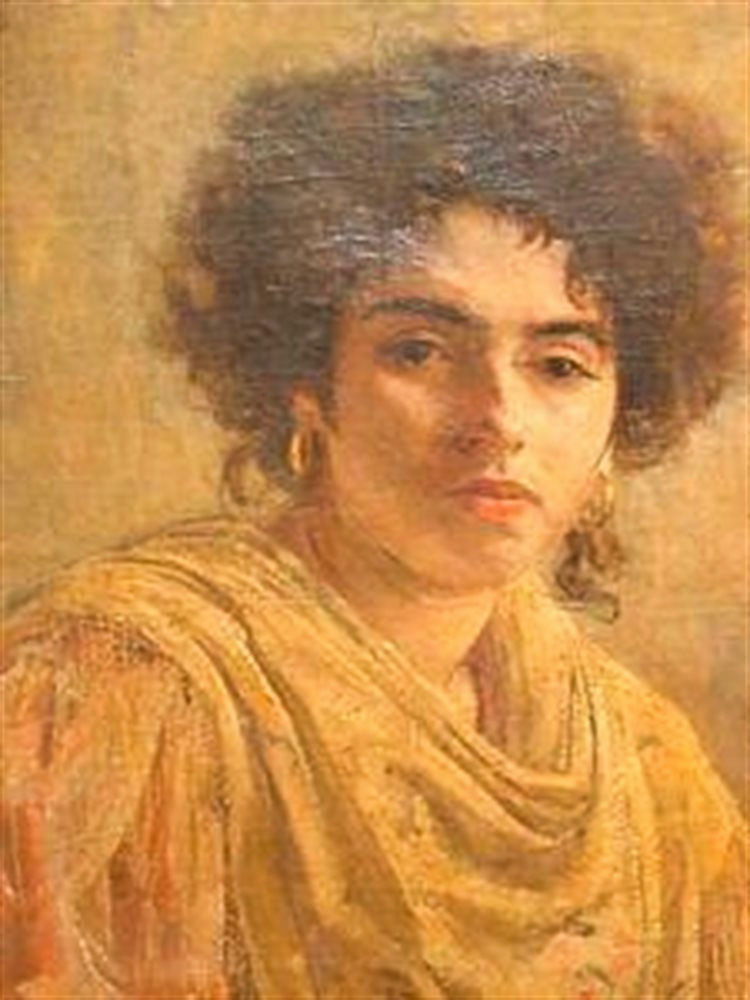
- Self-portrait (1900s)
- Born: 6 February 1869; Nijmegen, The Netherlands
- Died: 29 November 1934 (aged 65); Laren, The Netherlands
- Known for: Painter
- Spouse: Paul Rink (m. 1899; died in 1903) Hector Treub (m. 1907)

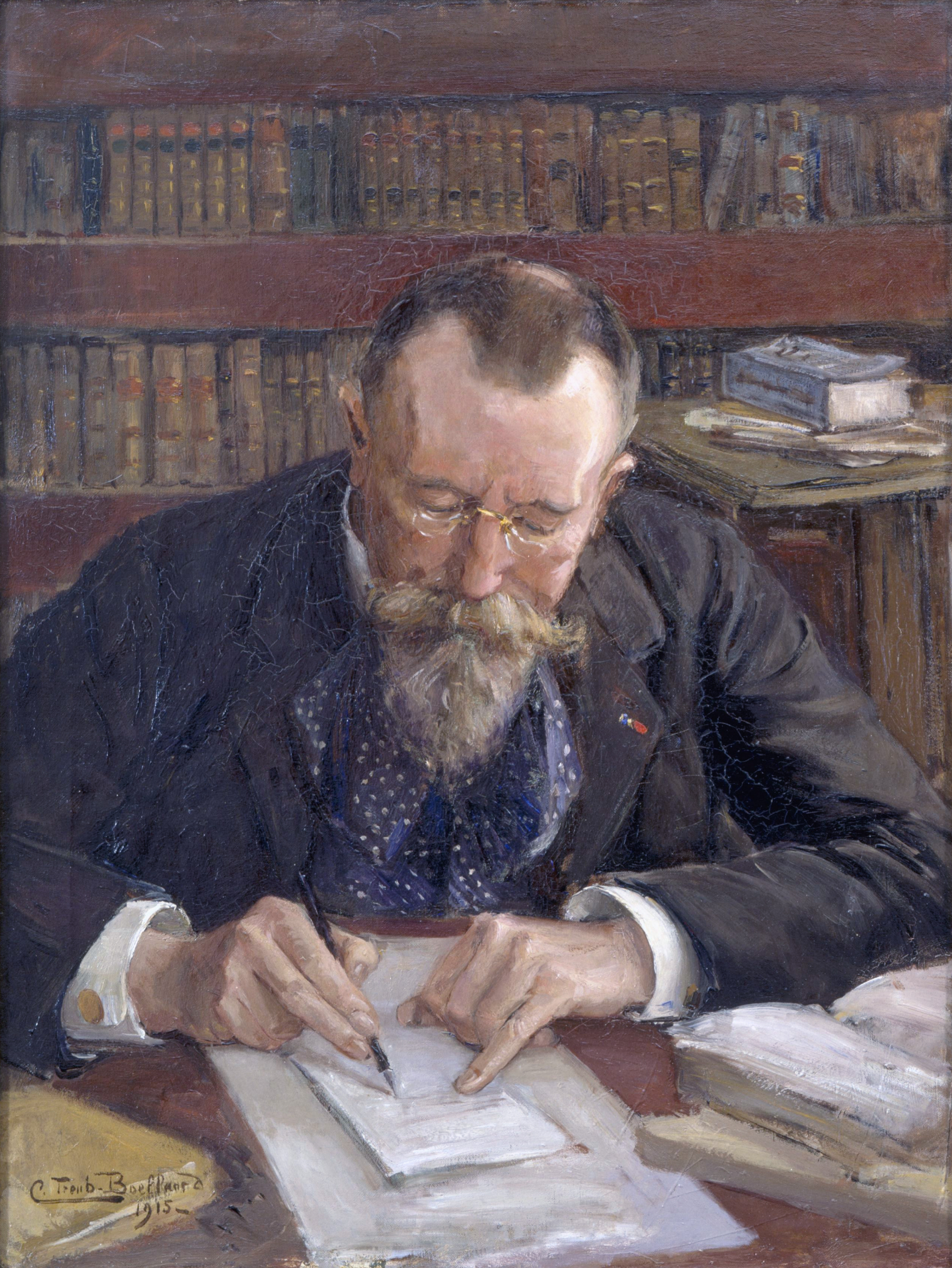
Portrait of her husband, Hector Treub

Cornelia Gerardina Boellaard, known as Corrie (6 February 1869 – 29 November 1934) was a Dutch painter and graphic artist. She was also referred to as "Corrie Rink-Boellaard" and "Corrie Treub-Boellaard".

== Biography ==
Boellaard was born in Nijmegen into a prominent Dutch family, with numerous members in government and the military. Her father, Jan Willem Boellaard (1830–1923), was a military officer and landowner in Herwijnen who served as an adjutant to Queen Wilhelmina.

She studied with Gerard Overman (1855-1906) in Amsterdam, then with Jules Joseph Lefebvre and Tony Robert-Fleury at the Académie Julian in Paris. In 1899, she married the painter, Paul Rink, who also acted as her teacher. He died prematurely in 1903. Four years later, she remarried; to Hector Treub, an obstetrician and Professor at Amsterdam University.

She was a member of Arti et Amicitiae and the Kunstenaarsvereniging Sint Lucas. She exhibited at the Nationale Tentoonstelling van Vrouwenarbeid 1898 (National Exhibition of Women's Labor), De Vrouw 1813–1913 (The Woman) and the Exhibition of Living Masters.

She died in 1934 in Laren.
