= René Charles Edmond His =

19th-20th century French painter

- Born: 1 February 1877; Colombes, Hauts-de-Seine, France
- Died: 1960
- Education: Jules Lefebvre, Tony Robert-Fleury, Léon Tanzi
- Works: Les Gorges d’el Kantara près de Biskra (1901), Matin de Juin (1920)
- Movement: Academicism, Orientalism
- Awards: Prix Brizard, 1898

Signature
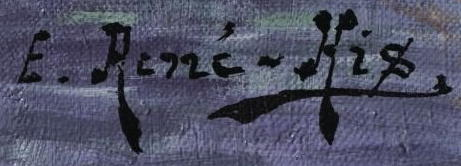

René Charles Edmond His (1 February 1877 – 1960), who signed his paintings René His or E. René-His, was a formally trained French painter known for landscapes, especially of rivers, and for Orientalist scenes inspired by travel in Algeria. Coming of age and achieving early success at the end of the 1800s, His carried into the twentieth century the rigorous Academic standards and pre-Impressionist realism of earlier French artists like Jean-Léon Gérôme. After the large virtuoso paintings that launched his career, he settled into a steady production of riverine landscapes of more conventional dimensions with exquisite colors and illusionistic depictions of light on still water. He exhibited in the Paris Salon virtually every year of his long career, and his paintings found collectors throughout his lifetime and beyond, especially in France and Great Britain, less so in the United States.

== Career ==
Pure landscape: Matin de Juin, exhibited at the Paris Salon of 1920 (private collection).

His was born in the small town of Colombes, Hauts-de-Seine, France, in 1877. Little is known about his private life. He was taught by a distinguished set of teachers including Jules Lefebvre, Tony Robert-Fleury, and Léon Tanzi. The most important influence on his work was Henri Biva, whose meticulous attention to detail and feeling for nature inspired His to strive for perfection in his depictions of river and woodland scenes.

In 1898, His won the Prix Brizard of 3000 francs awarded annually by the Academie des Beaux-Arts to a landscape artist age 28 or younger (His was 21), for his painting En Aiglard, which also received an Honorable Mention at the Paris Salon of 1898.

In 1900, he was inducted into the Société des Artistes Français, of which he was to be a lifelong member, and his painting Tranquilité received a Bronze Medal at the Salon. That same year, at the Exposition Universelle in Paris, his painting Ophélie (depicting Hamlet’s drowned betrothed) received an Honorable Mention, though at the Salon of 1899 some critics had preferred the landscape to the lady:

If one were to ask M. René His what dramatic episode he wanted to paint with the young girl who swims white and dead–too white and perhaps not dead enough–in the company of water lilies and irises, the artist would reply to you, with the Salon catalog, that he represented Shakespeare's Ophelia. She is even as banal in painting as in that overlooked phrase of the poet, that she looked like "a creature native and indued unto that element. But long it could not be….” The lovely miss misses. Less so, the delicious and fresh landscape of tender greenery, as if it had a soul or as if it wanted to make for the dead her tomb, this second cradle of survival even sweeter than the first to those who sleep to forget, after having lived only to remember.

The successful young artist’s abundant energy and ambition found expression in extravagantly large canvases, such as Les Gorges d’el Kantara près de Biskra of 1901 (238 x 335 cm.; 93 3/4 by 132 in.). His was taken to task by a critic at the Salon of 1904 for exemplifying a trend toward the gigantic:

This lack of sensible proportions was really the characteristic of this Salon cluttered with vast, unattractive frames. Least is wisest. I would like to lecture one last time, in their sincere interest, three artists who stubbornly go astray in pursuit of scoring the most points, as if they were still kids in primary school. I mean MM. René His, René Fath and Laurent-Gsell. Each strives to produce disproportionate canvases, and the youngest of them, M. His [then about 27], unwisely but with pleasure compromises his talent by painting an immensity: Solitude, a kilometer-wide landscape that covered the entire main wall of one of the galleries of the Salon.

After the large, bravura paintings that launched his career, His settled into a steady production of landscapes of more modest dimensions, exhibiting new work at the Paris Salon virtually every year of his long career. The Mediterranean coast of France is sometimes the subject, but tranquil, sunlit rivers, especially the Yonne, predominate. Bridges and mills occasionally appear, providing identifiable locations, as do boaters and washerwomen, but the most typical His painting is (to use the phrase coined by Pissarro) pure landscape, depicting nature devoid of humans and human activity, works like Matin de Juin (1920).

Much rarer subjects (both undated) include a scene of the Biblical Exodus, auctioned in Italy in 2015, and a floral still life, auctioned by Aguttes in France in 2012.

== Algerian subjects ==
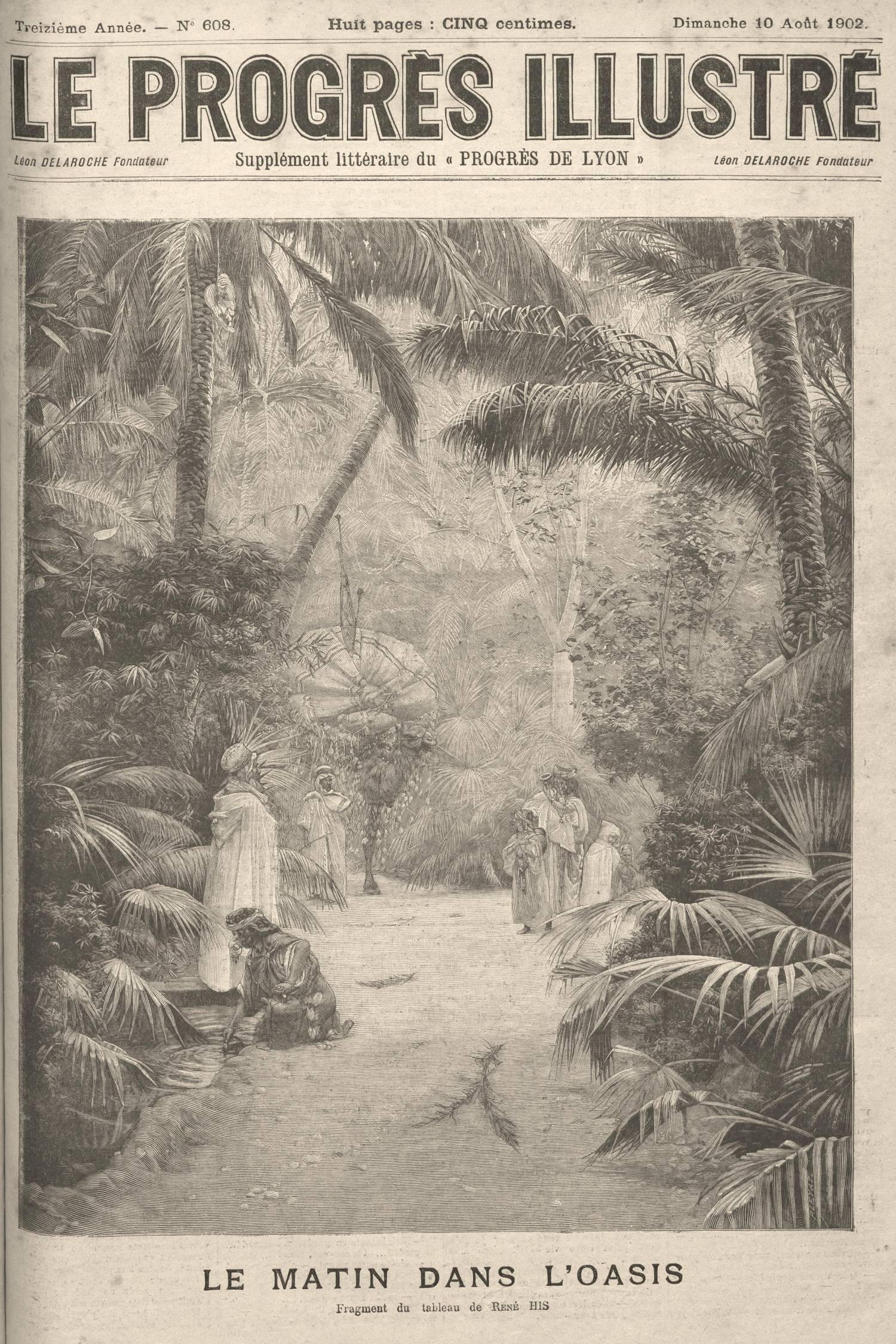
Front page of Le Progrès Illustré #608 (10 August 1902), using an engraving of Matin dans l'Oasis, Tougourth by René His. The painting was displayed at the Paris Salon of 1902.

Early in his career, His lived and worked in Algeria. His paintings adorned municipal halls in the city of Constantine and the museum there exhibited several of his works.

His paintings, often large, of hunters or nomads from the highlands, or oasis scenes around Biskra, are painted with audacity and vigor; they accurately depict the life and customs of the nomads. The luminous intensity that bathes his paintings and the vivid colors capture the strong Algerian sunlight.

== His in museums ==
In his lifetime, paintings by His were collected by museums in France, Algeria, and Great Britain. A number of those in French museums were donated by Baron Alphonse de Rothschild, who collected the artist’s early work.

=== France ===
- Musée Boucher de Perthe, Abbeville, Frissons de la rivière (c. 1901, Rothschild donation)
- Musée des Beaux-Arts, Rennes, La Rive fleurie (1901, Rothschild donation)
- Musée de Senlis, Les Cygnes (1903)
- Musée de Cahor Henri-Martin, Le Douar au crépuscule (1903)
- Musée de Maubeuge, Un Oued au Hamma (c. 1904, Rothschild donation)
- Musée de l'Ardenne, Charleville-Mézières, Buisson des lilas (by 1909, Rothschild donation)

=== Algeria ===
- Musée de Constantine (now Le Musée Public National Cirta de Constantine), Le Chemin du Moulin D’Aiglard (1901)

=== Great Britain ===
- Newport Museum and Art Gallery, Le Vieux Pont (n.d.)
- National Trust for Scotland, Hermiston Quay, Le Sentier du Moulin (n.d.)

== His at auction ==
A record for a His painting was set by the large Les Gorges d’el Kantara près de Biskra of 1901, auctioned for €102,750 by Sotheby’s in Paris in 2012. (The canvas had been offered in an unrestored state at Alex Cooper Auctioneers in Maryland earlier that year and sold for $10,000.) Another early, large canvas, the lush riverine landscape auctioned in 2018 by Christie’s in Paris as Les Nénuphars (1899), realized €20,000. More typical is the €5000 paid in 2020 at a Bérard-Péron auction in Lyon in for Dans la Valée du Cousin (1913), and the $4000 winning bid for Iris et nenuphars sur une riviere calme at Brunk Auctions in Asheville in 2024.
