= Louise-Cécile Descamps-Sabouret =

French painter and botanical artist

- Born: 3 October 1855; Paris, France
- Education: Tony Robert-Fleury
- Known for: Botanical art
- Movement: Société des Artistes Français

Louise-Cécile Descamps-Sabouret (born 3 October 1855 in Paris) was a French painter and botanical artist.

== Career ==
She studied under Tony Robert-Fleury and made her debut at the 1879 Paris Salon. In 1883 she became a member of the Société des Artistes Français. Descamps-Sabouret produced illustrations for La Revue Horticole (1891-1901) and the Journal des Roses.

She was a member of Société nationale d'horticulture de France and lived in the rue de Tolbiac in Paris.

== Gallery ==
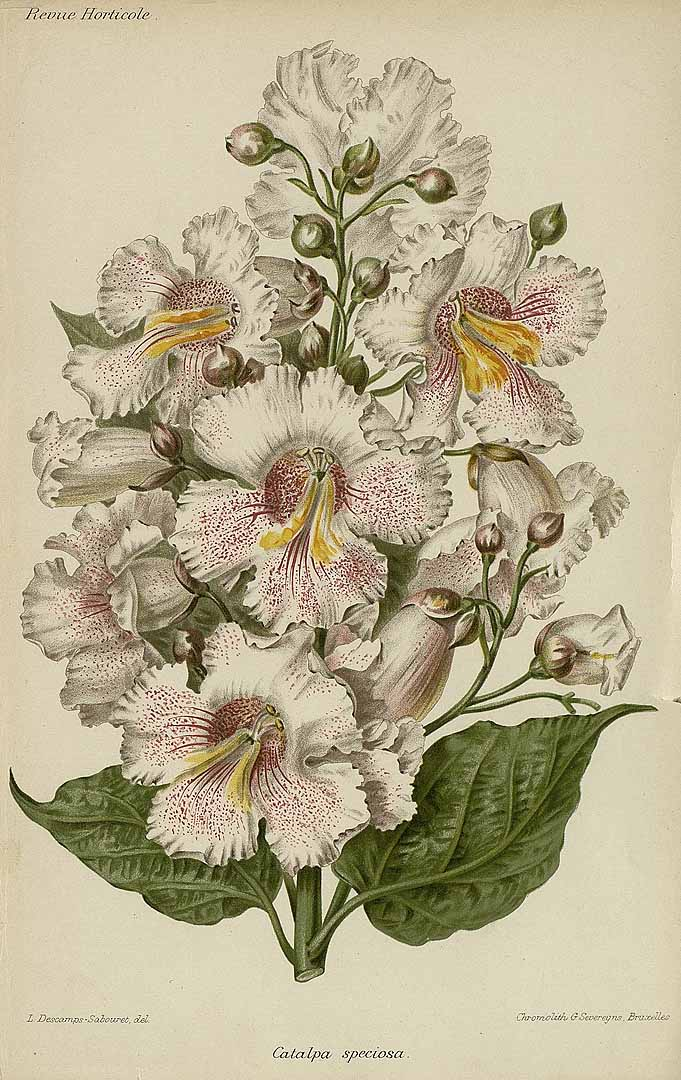
Catalpa speciosa

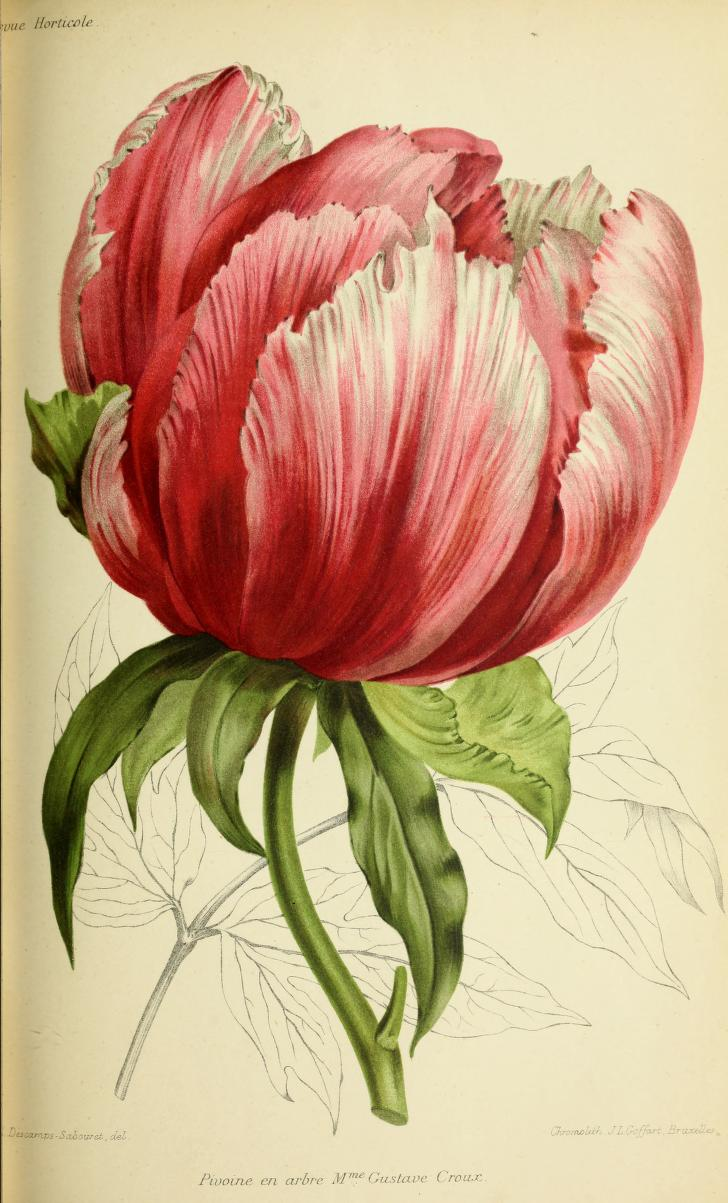
Peony 'Mme Gustave Croux'

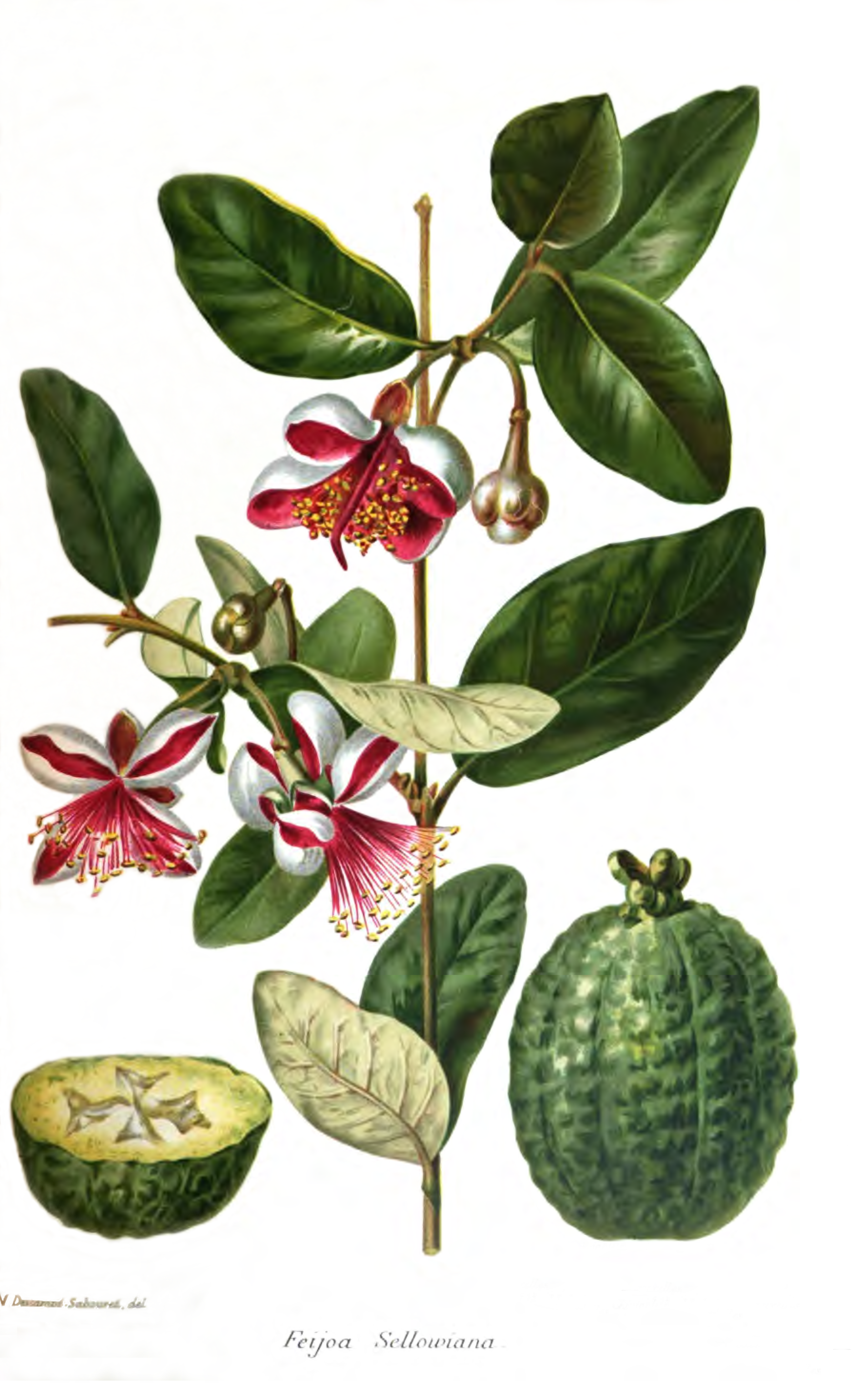
Feijoa sellowania

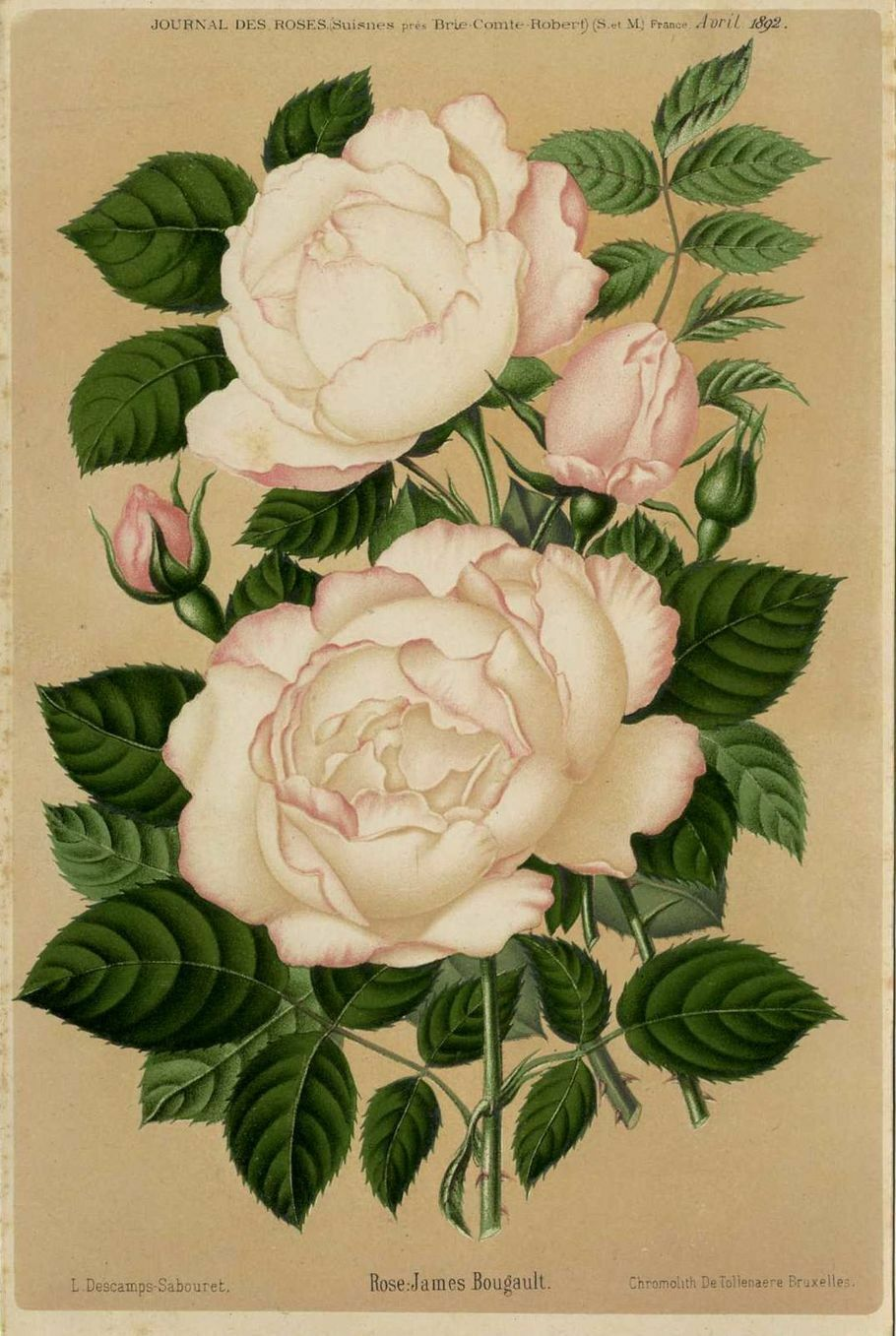
Rose 'James Bougault'

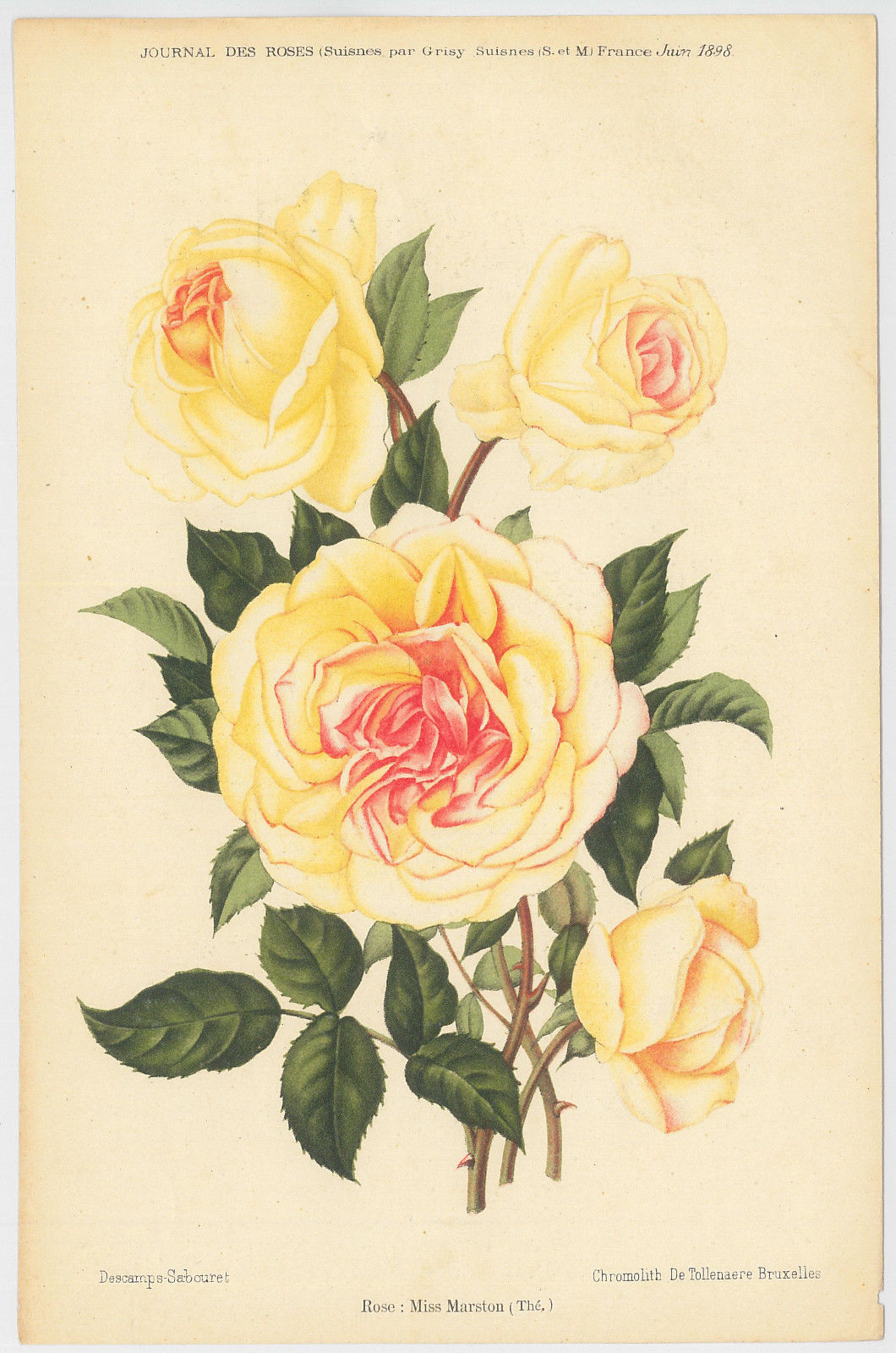
Rose 'Miss Marston'

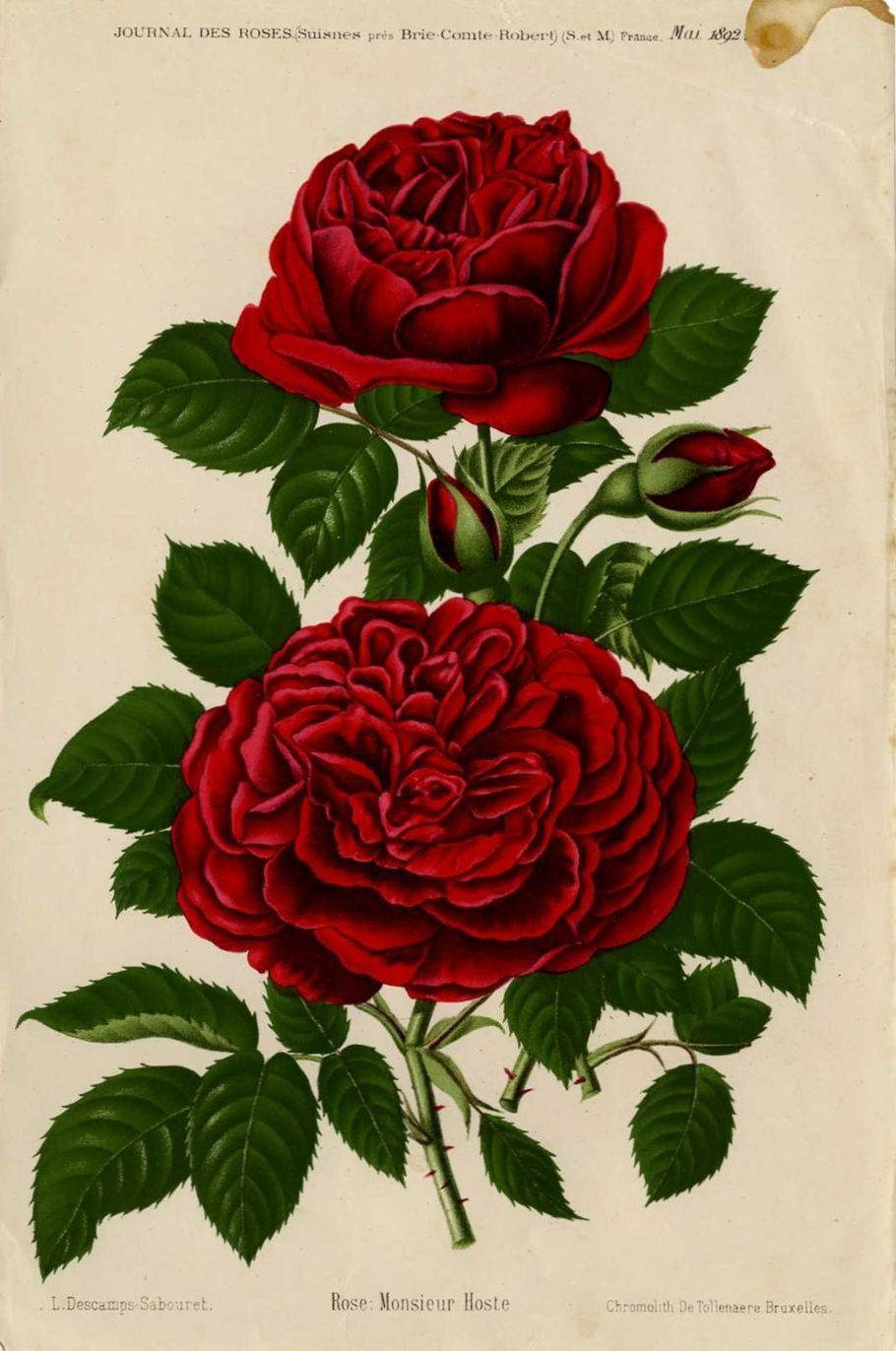
Rose 'Monsieur Hoste'

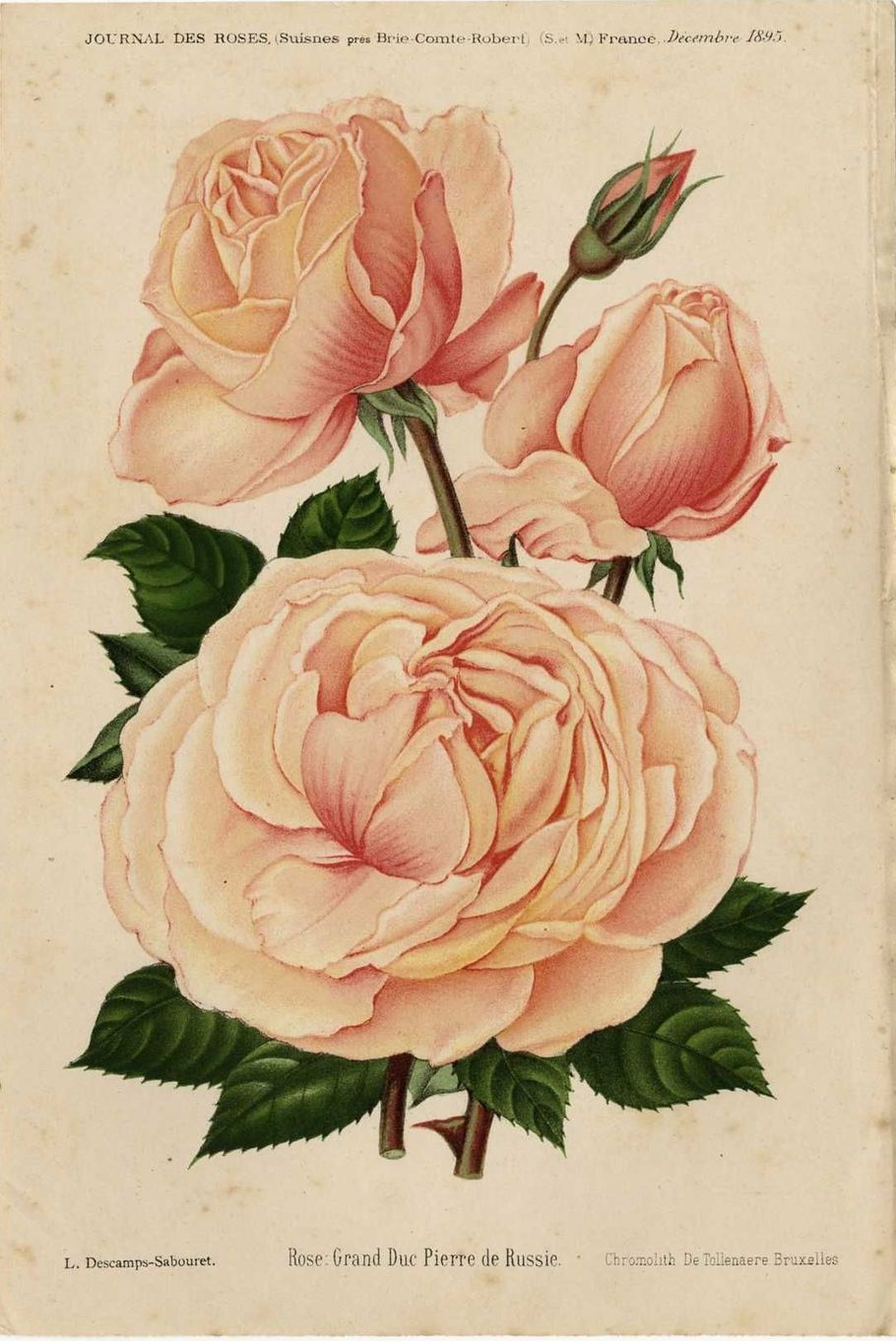
Rose 'Grand-Duc Pierre de Russie'

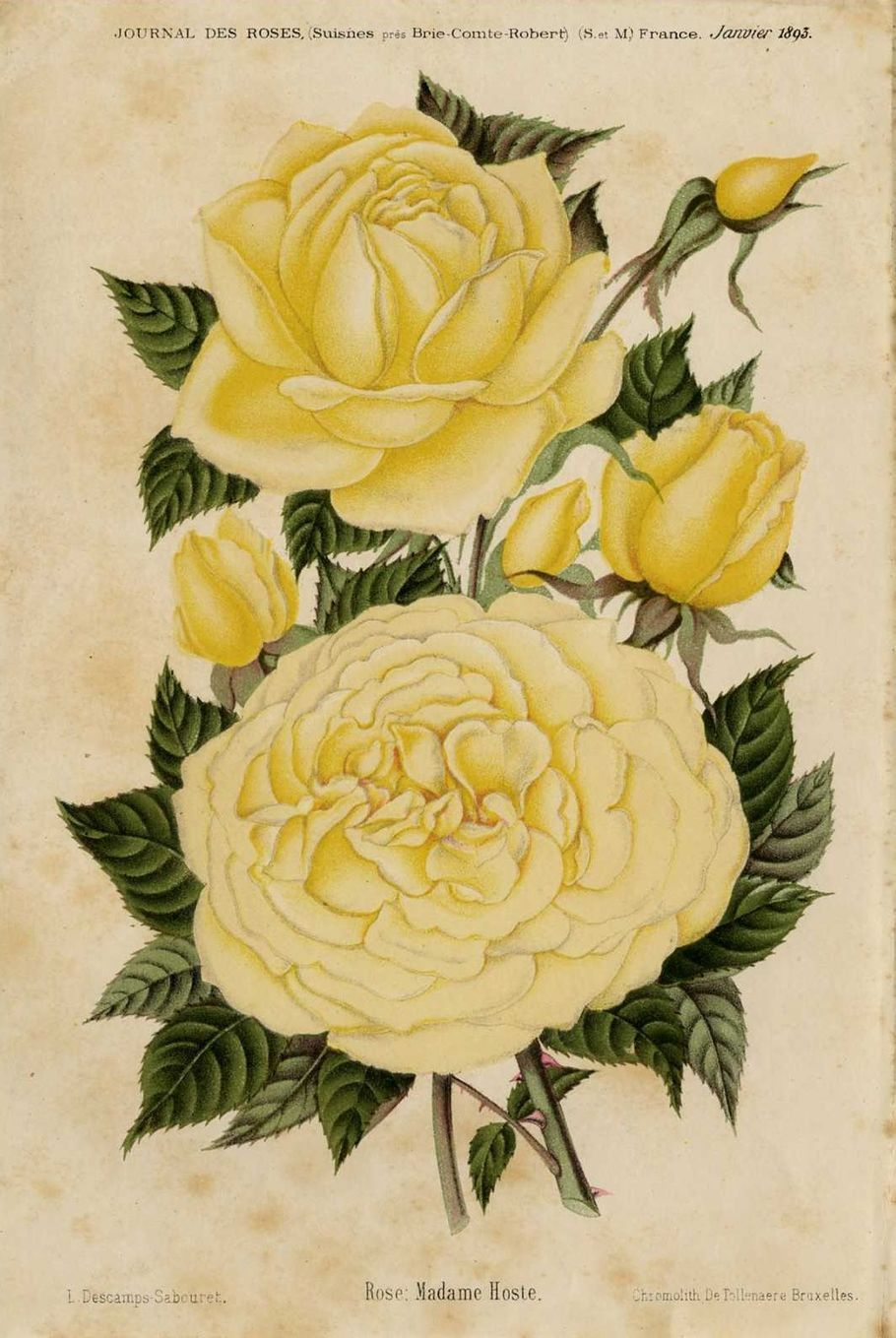
Rose 'Madame Hoste'

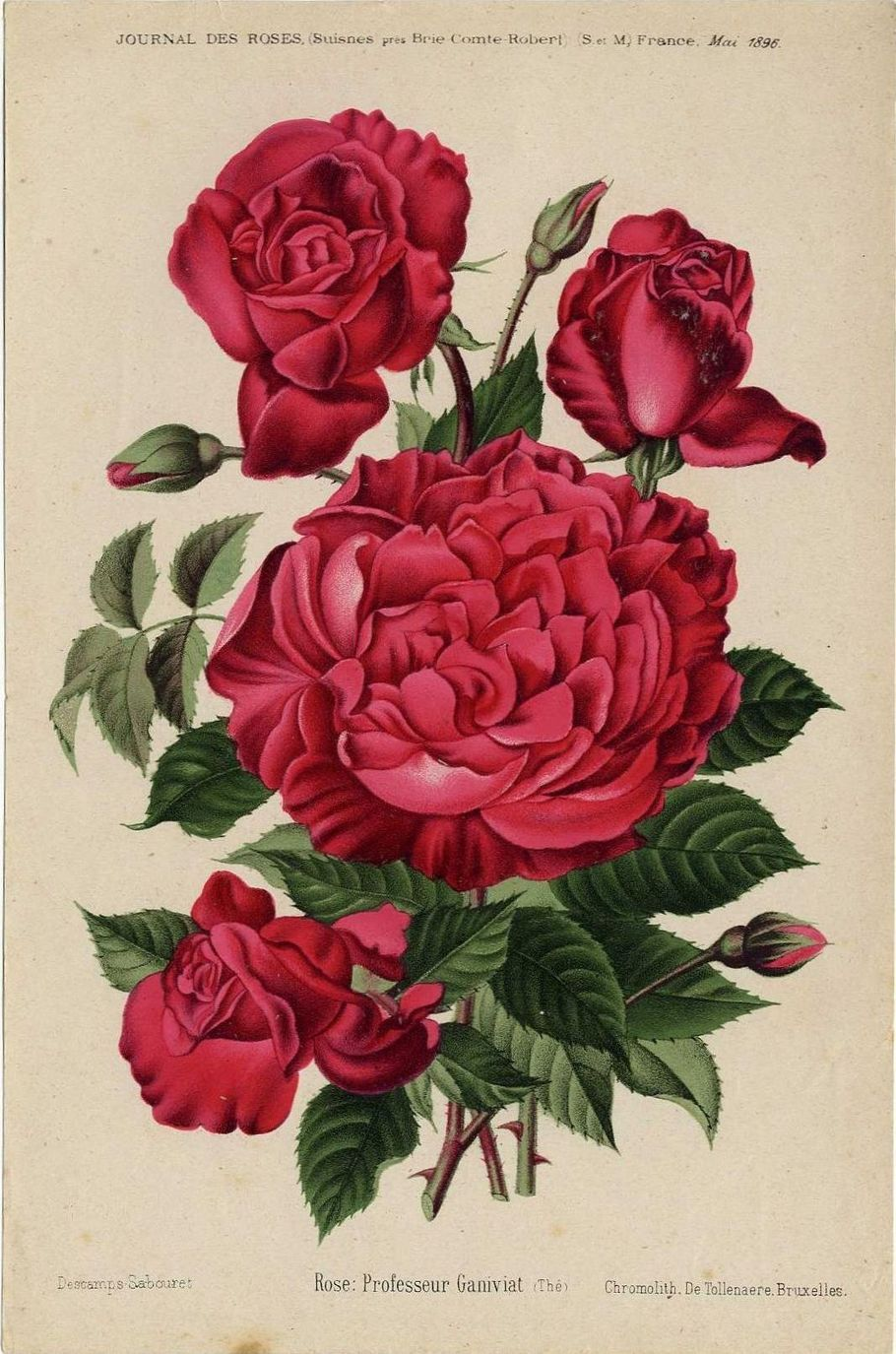
Rose 'Professeur Ganiviat'

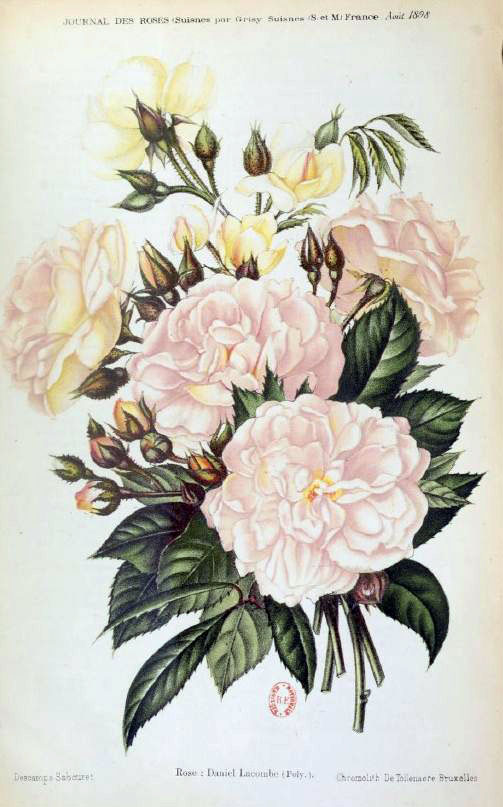
Rose 'Daniel Lacombe'

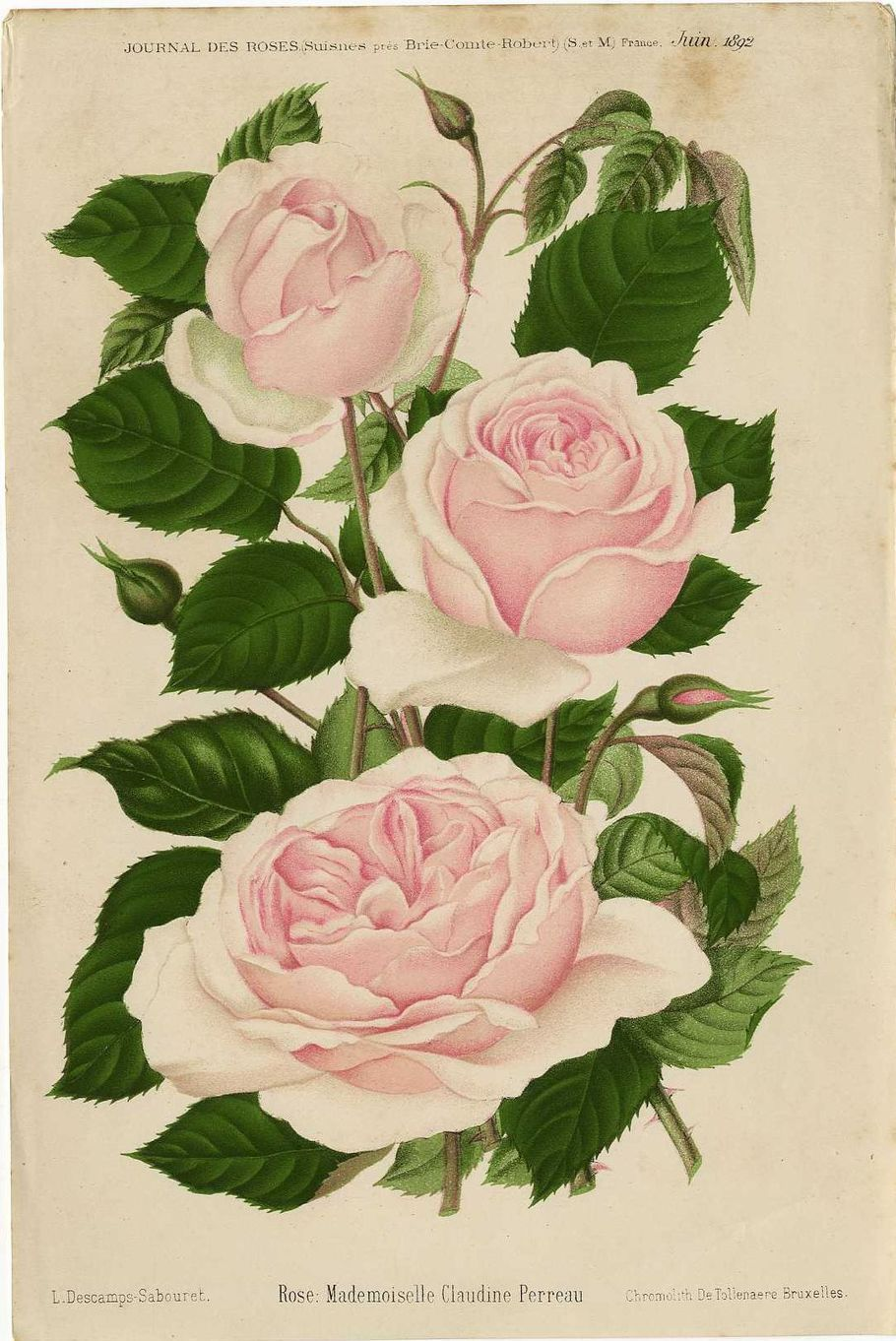
Rose 'Mademoiselle Claudine Perreau'

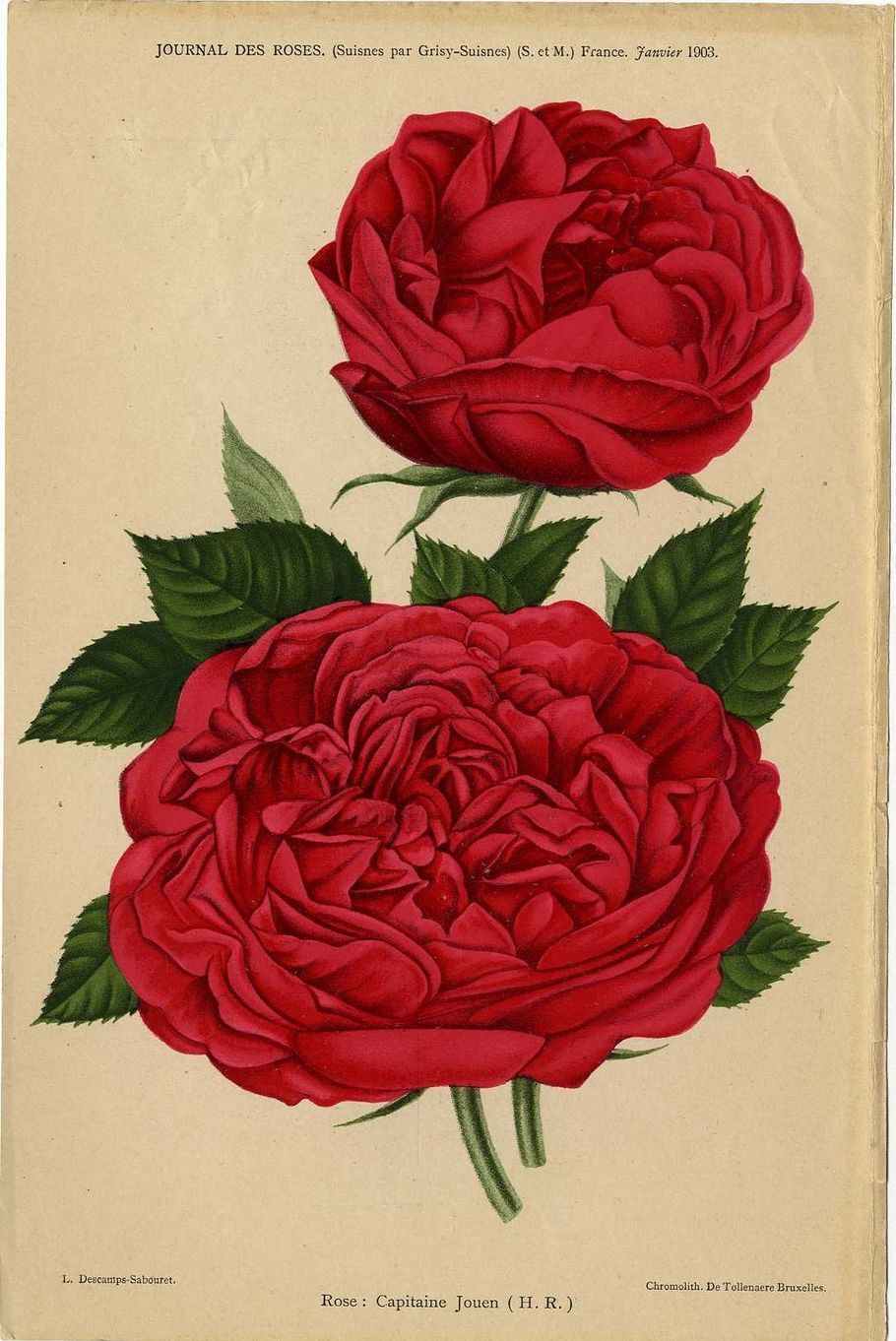
Rose 'Capitaine Jouen'
