= Guillaume Seignac =

French painter

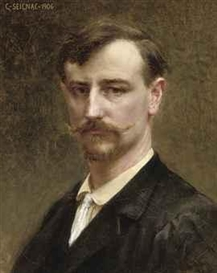
Self-portrait, 1906

Guillaume Seignac (French pronunciation: [ɡijom sɛɲak]; 25 September 1870 – 2 October 1924) was a French academic painter.

== Childhood ==
Guillaume was born in Rennes in 1870, and died in Paris in 1924. He started training at the Académie Julian in Paris, where he spent 1889 through 1895. He had many teachers there, including Gabriel Ferrier, William-Adolphe Bouguereau, and Tony Robert-Fleury.

== Career ==
In addition to his training in the academic style, much of Seignac's work displayed classical themes and style, for example, his use of diaphanous drapery covering a woman's body is reminiscent of classical style, in particular the sculptor Phidias. In 1897, Guillaume Seignac regularly exhibited at the Salon and won several honors, including in 1900 honorable mention and in 1903 a Third Class medal.

== List of paintings ==
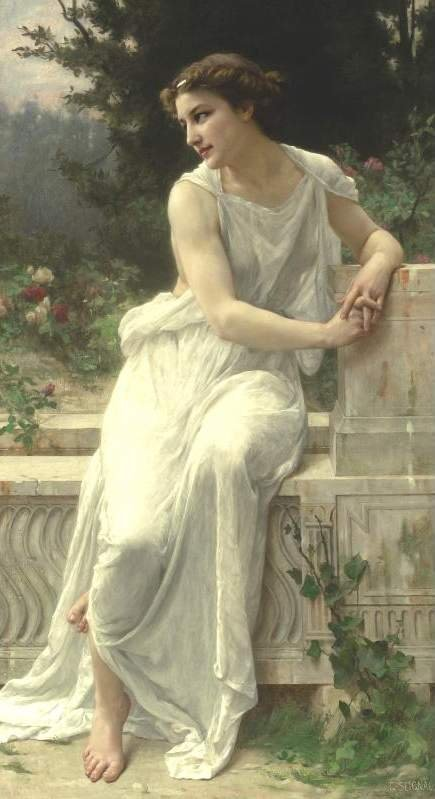
Young Woman of Pompeii on a Terrace

- An Afternoon Rest
- Admiring Beauty
- Beauty at the Well
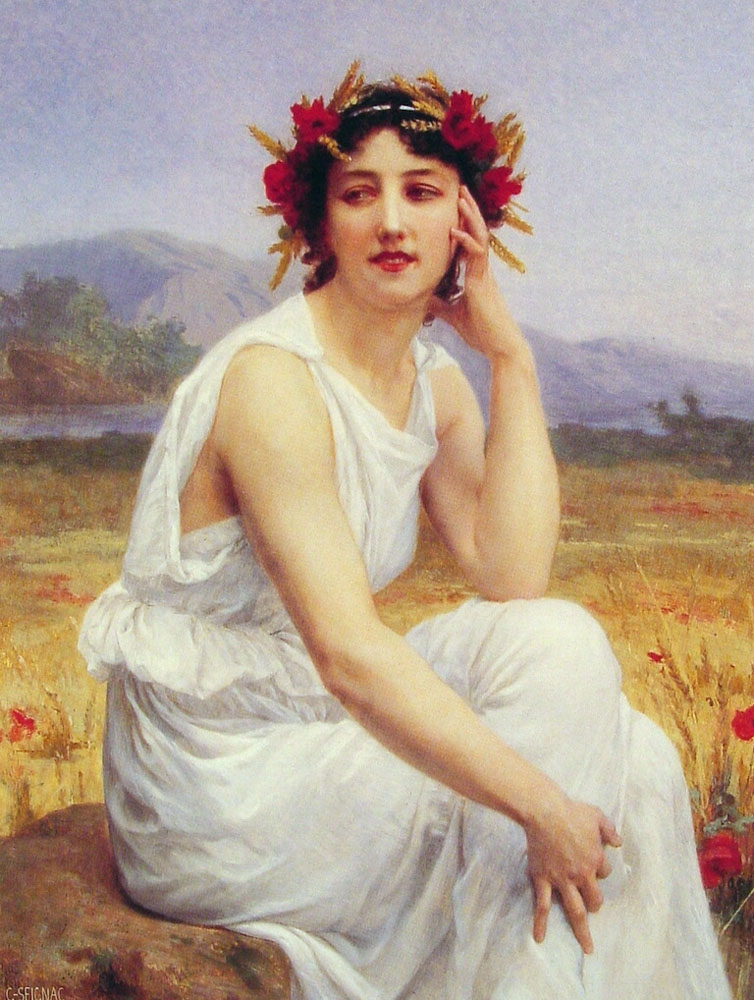
  The Muse
- Confidence
- Cupid And Psyche
- Cupid Disarmed

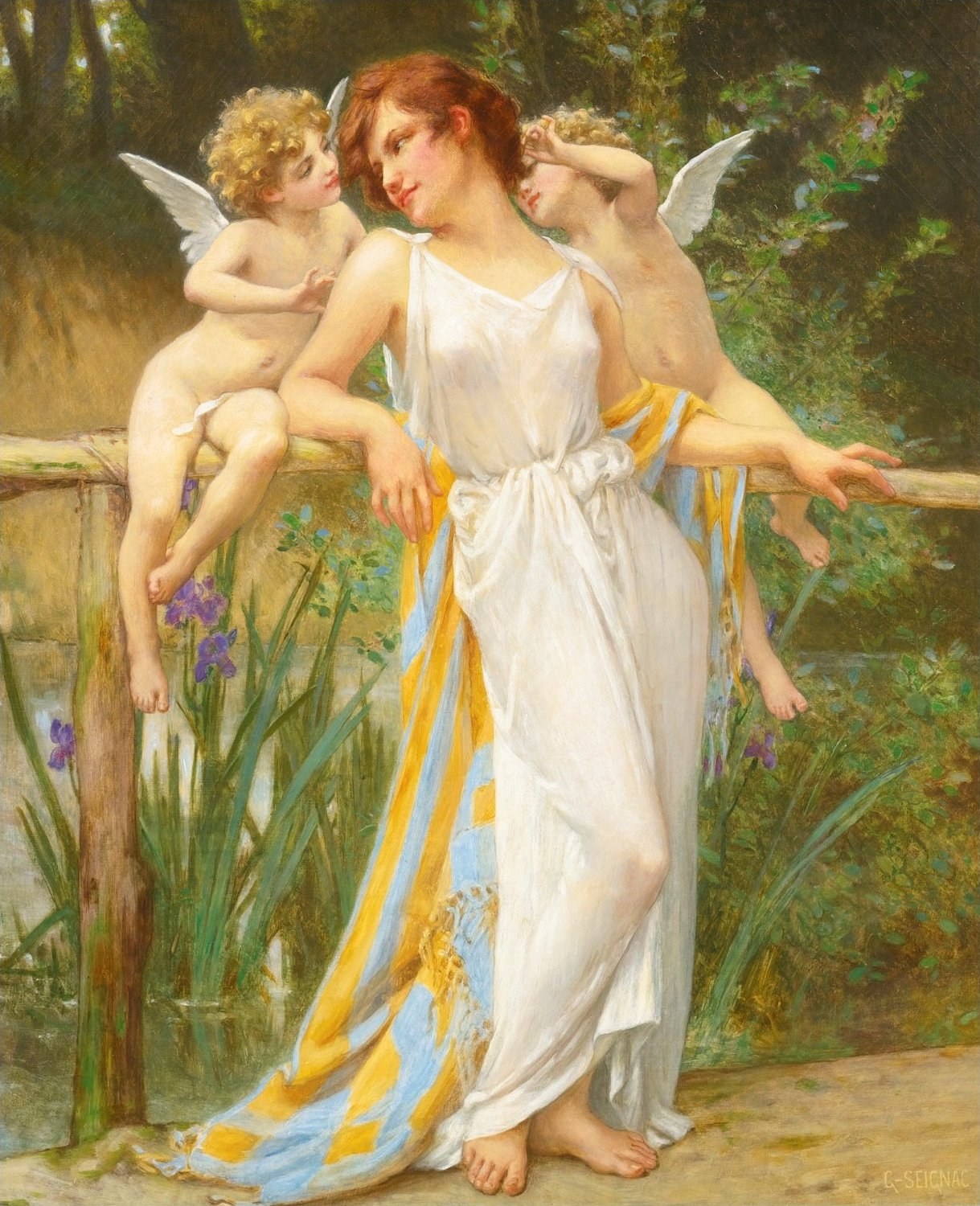
Psyche with Putti

- Cupid's Folly
- Diana Hunting
- Faunesse

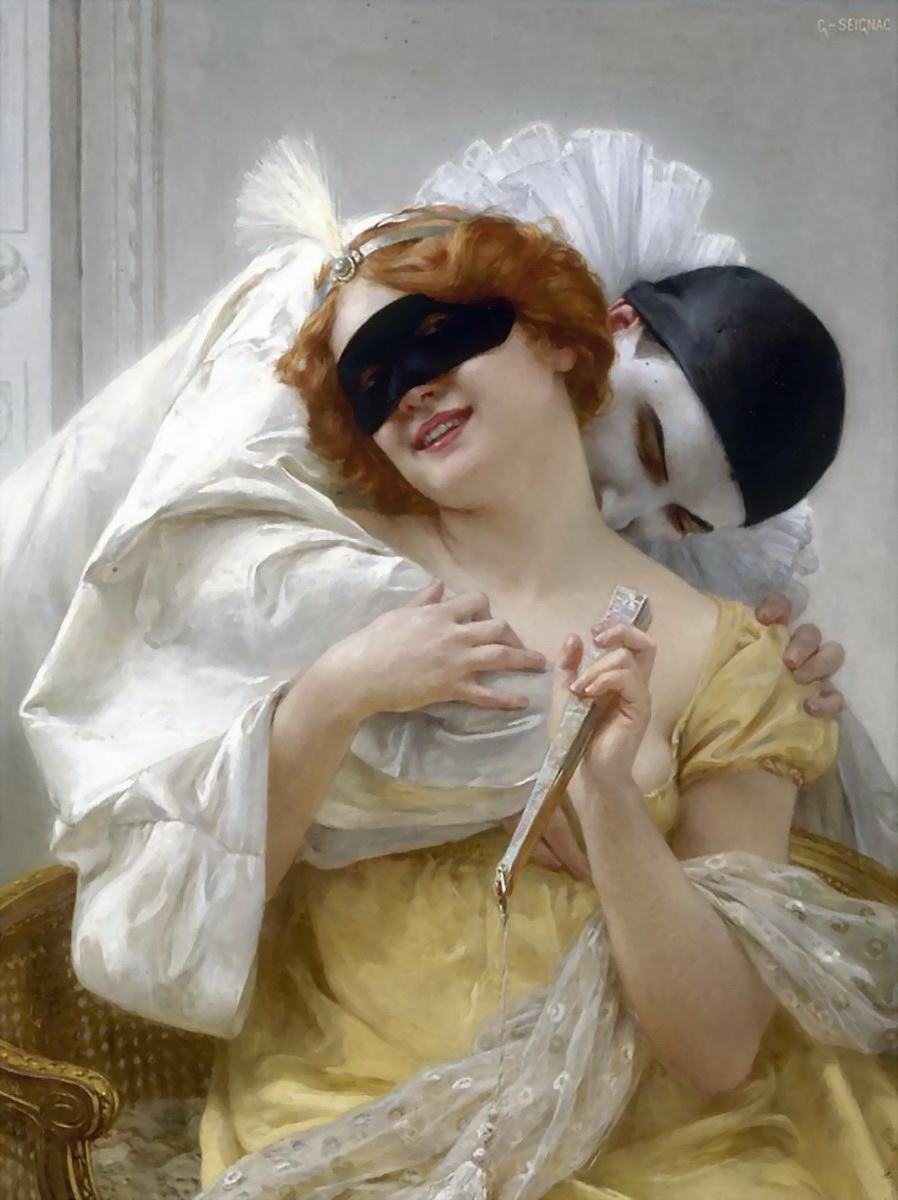
Pierrot's embrace, 1900

- Innocence
- L'Abandon
- La Libellule

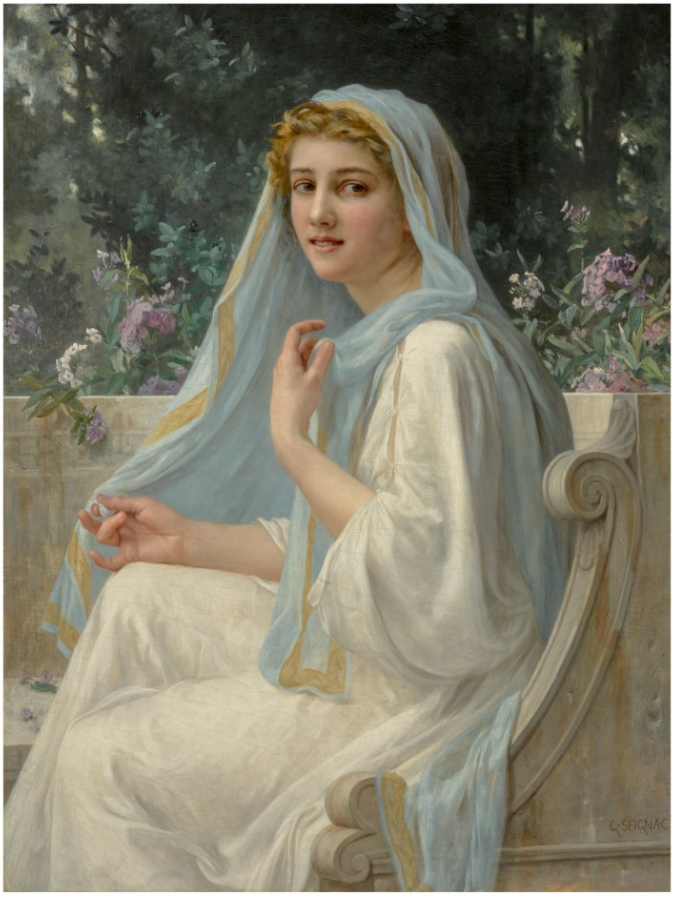
Reflections

- La Paresseuse
- Loves Advances
- Nude on the Beach

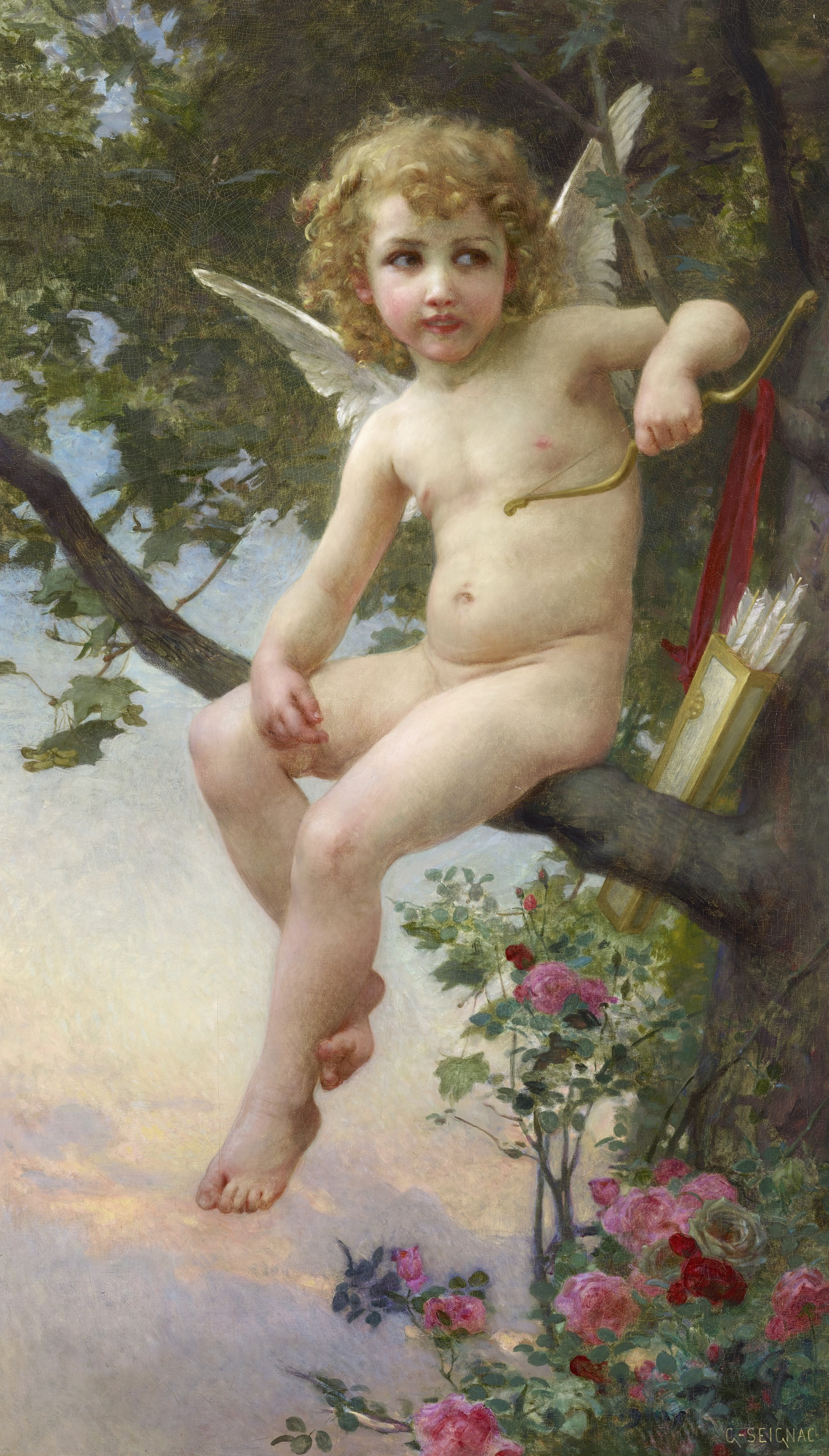
Cupid

- Nymph
- Nymph at the Fountain
- Nymph With Cupids

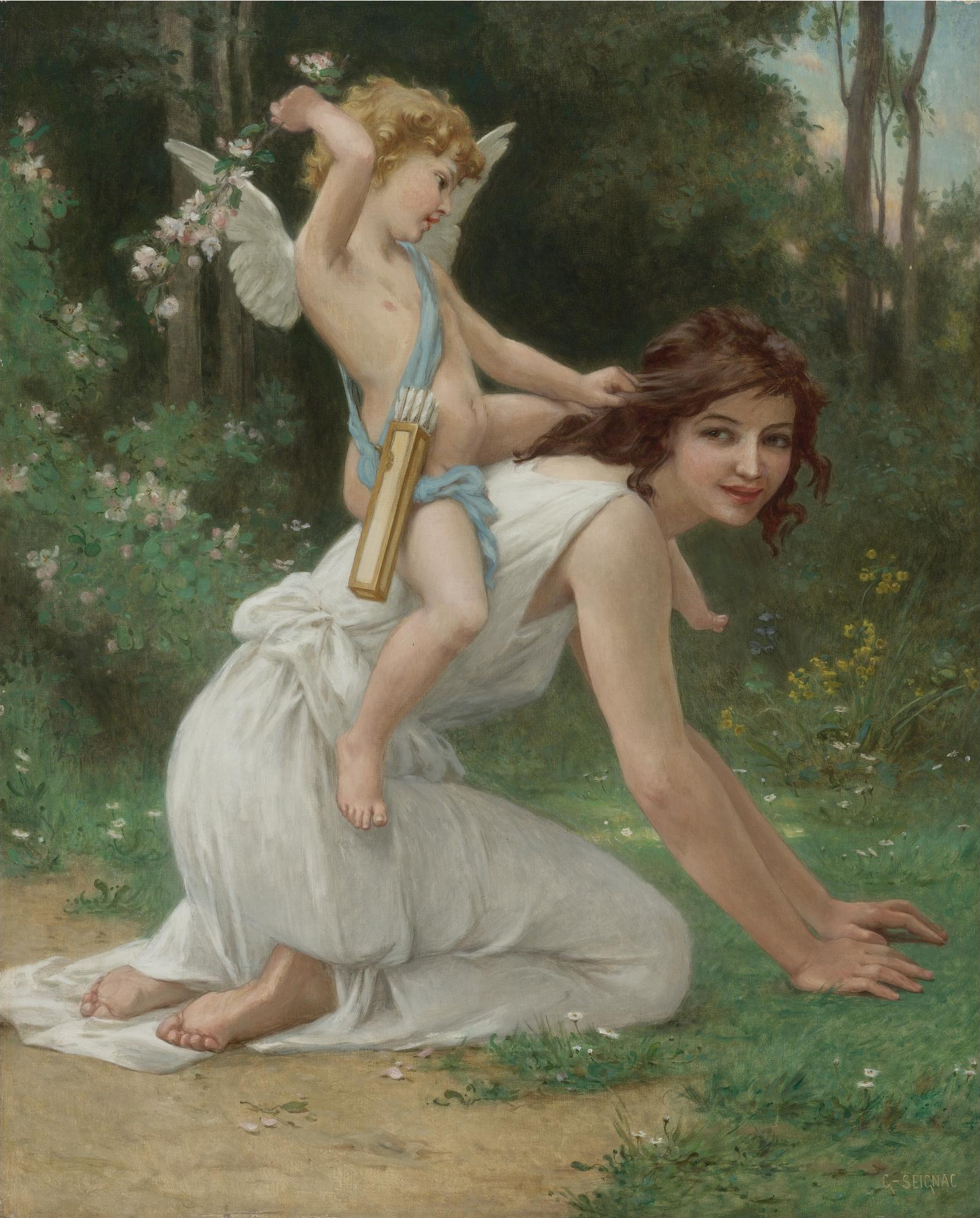
Venus and Cupid

- Pierrot Vainqueur
- Psyche
- Reflections
- The Awakening of Psyche
- The Fragrant Iris
- The Muse
- The Wave
- Vanity
- Venus And Cupid
- Virginity
- Young Woman Naked on a Settee
- Young Woman of Pompeii on a Terrace
