= Emil Beurmann =

Swiss painter, writer and poet

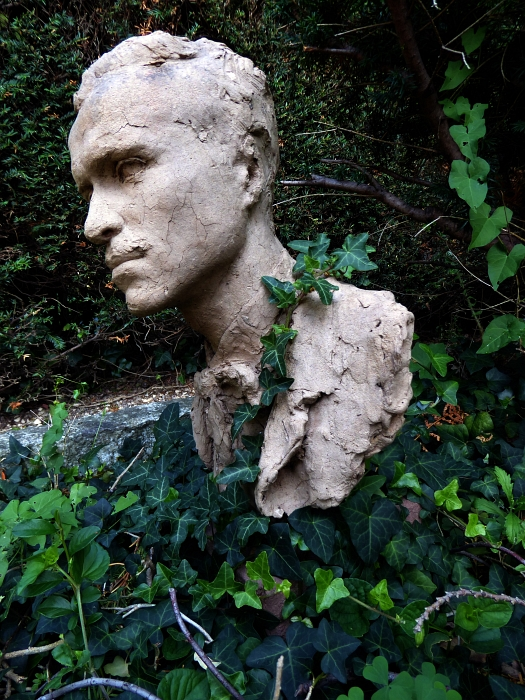
Emil Beurmann, a Swiss painter, writer and poet (1862-1951)

Emil Beurmann (14 March 1862 – 5 February 1951) was a Swiss painter, writer and poet.

== Life ==
Beurmann was born and grew up in Basel. From an early age he was writing (both prose and poetry) and painting.

He undertook an apprenticeship as a decorative painter, also taking lessons with Hans Sandreuter. An early influence at this stage was his fellow student Lisa Ruutz, later known as the poet Lisa Wenger.

In 1881 he travelled to Paris, at that time an "artists' mecca". He found himself a cheap room in the Latin Quarter and quickly made contact with high-profile artists including Albert Anker, Lovis Corinth, Cuno Amiet und Giovanni Giacometti. There followed a period combining study with travel that took in Germany, Italy, France, Turkey, Spain and Egypt where he lived for a year or so in Cairo, living with his two models Nebiha and Chadiga. After this he settled back home in Basel where he was able to make a living producing portraits, although he came to dislike this work. He then successfully identified a new source of income: drawing inspiration from his travels, he produced a series of humorous travel books, also contributing articles and features on fellow artists to the National Zeitung (as the newspaper was known at that time). He owes his reputation as the "city poet" to a series of amusing newspaper columns he contributed under the pseudonym "Beuz".

In 1892, Beurmann painted Basler Gedenkfeier, a work in the style of Art Nouveau, that became the poster for the 500-year jubilee celebrating the union of Grossbasel and Kleinbasel in 1392. He became a member of the Basel city Theatre Commission in 1900, and was entrusted with looking after the theatre's costume collection. In his later years he lived with his wife Mariely (who was 25 years younger than he) at a city centre address near the river, along the prestigious "Wettsteinallee". Their home became a focus for the cultural elite of the day, with visitors such as Richard Strauss, Max Reinhardt and the Viennese writer, Arthur Schnitzler. At the age of 75, Emil Beurmann wrote, based on Johann Nestroy's posse Der böse Geist Lumpacivagabundus, the Baslerdüütsch libretto for Hans Haug's operetta E liederlig Kleeblatt (lit. 'A lascivious trio'). The operetta premiered at the Basler Stadttheater on 3 September 1938, and was a public success.

== Selected bibliography ==
- Emil Beurmann (1930). Emanuel meint ...: Gedichte u. Geschichten (in German). Buchdruckerei zum Hirzen.
- Emil Beurmann (1935). Gix und Gax (in German). Hirzen-Verlag, Buchdr. zum Hirzen A.-G.
- Emil Beurmann (1941). So sah es Beuz: Gedichte (in German). Hirzen-Verlag.
