= Guion (name) =

Guion is a given name and surname.

== Notable people ==
=== Given name ===
- Guion Bluford (born 1942), American aerospace engineer
- Guion Griffis Johnson (1900–1989), American historian

=== Surname ===
- Connie Guion (1882–1971), American physician and educator
- David Guion (born 1967), French football coach
- David W. Guion (1892–1981), American composer
- Isaac Guion (1755–1823), American military officer and settler
- John Isaac Guion (1802–1855), American politician from Mississippi
- Letroy Guion (born 1987), American football player
- Renée Guion (born 1999), American soccer player
- Stephen Barker Guion (1820–1885), American businessman, co-founder of the Williams & Guion Black Star Line
- Walter Guion (1849–1927), American politician from Louisiana
- William Howe Guion (1817–1890), American businessman, co-founder of the Williams & Guion Black Star Line

== See also ==
- Guyon, a variant spelling
