= Maximilienne Guyon =

French painter

Maximilienne Goepp-Guyon
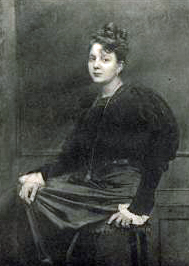
- Born: Maximilienne Guyon; 24 May 1868; Paris, France
- Died: 1903 (aged 34–35); Neuilly-sur-Seine, France
- Known for: Painting

Maximilienne Guyon (1868–1903) was a French painter, water-colorist, etcher, and illustrator.

== Biography ==
Guyon was born on 24 May 1868 in Paris. She studied with Tony Robert-Fleury, Jules Joseph Lefebvre, and Gustave Boulanger at the Académie Julian. In 1887 she made her debut at the Salon de Paris and frequently exhibited her paintings there.

In 1892 she exhibited her work at the Palais de l'Industrie in Paris. Guyon exhibited her work in the Woman's Building at the 1893 World's Columbian Exposition in Chicago, Illinois. Her work was included in the 1900 Exposition Universelle.

Guyon was a member of the Société d'aquarellistes français, the Société des Artistes Français, and the Societe des Prix du Salon et Boursiers de Voyage. She illustrated works by Honoré de Balzac, and André Theuriet. She also taught painting.

Guyon died in December 1903 in Neuilly-sur-Seine.

== Gallery ==
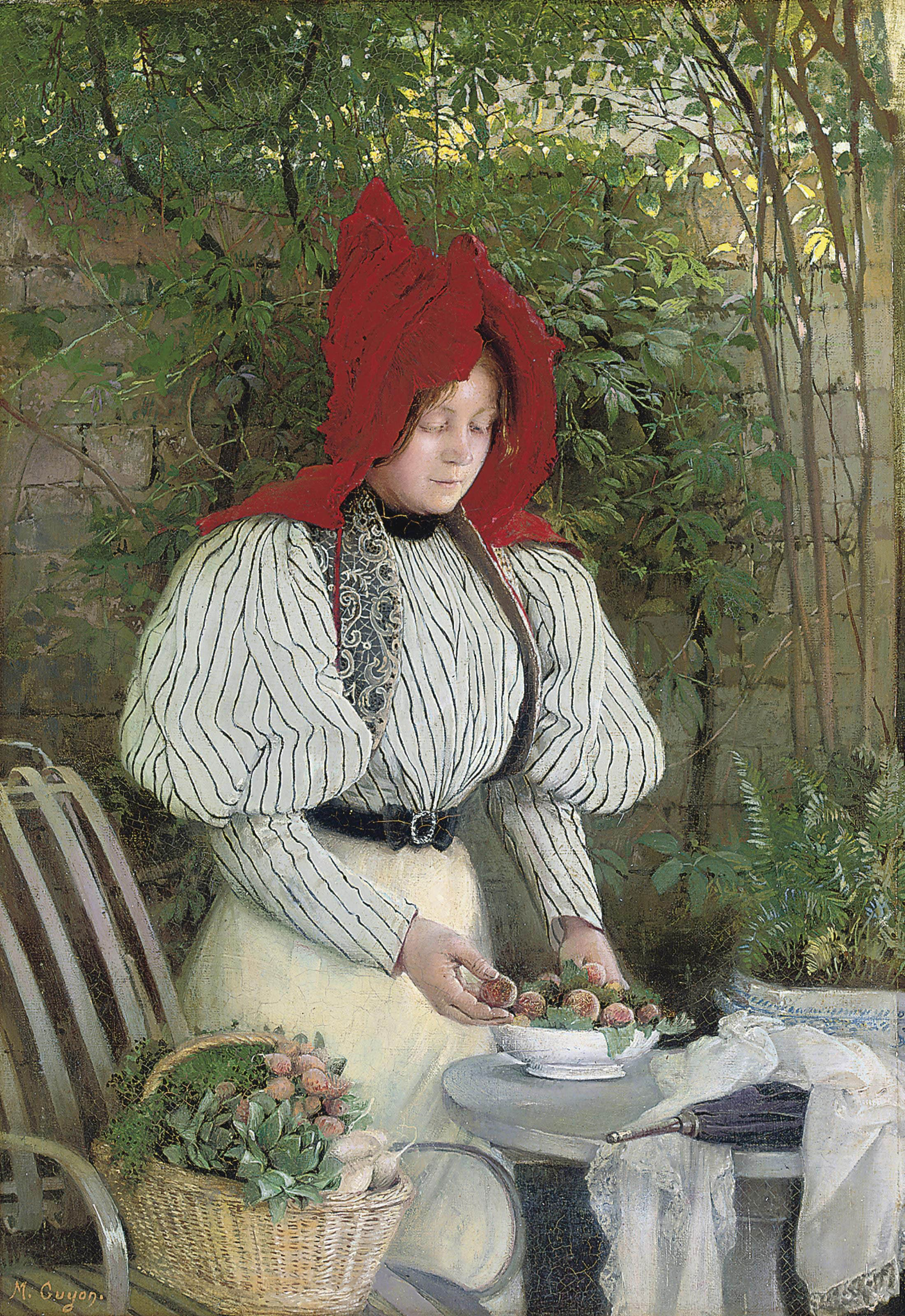
Hors Concours

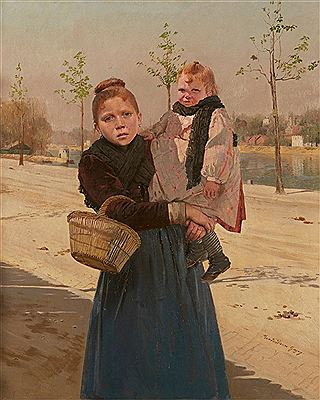
Les enfants

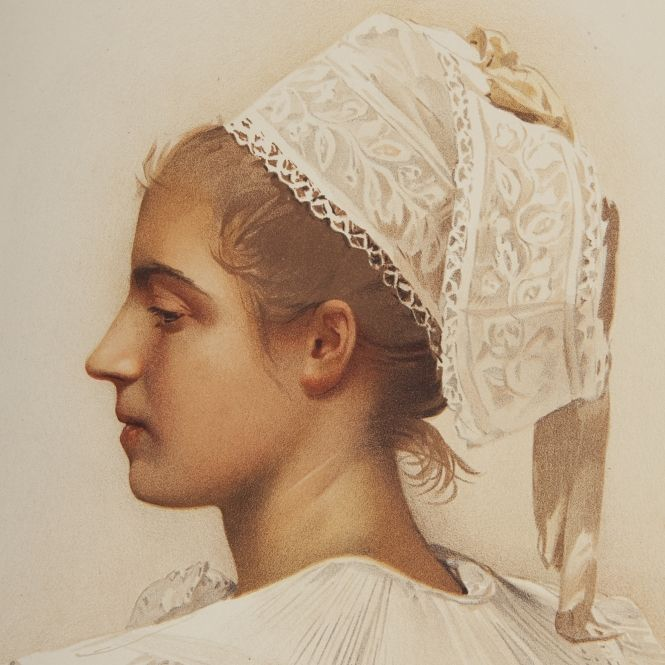
lithograph - Young Breton Lady in Profile

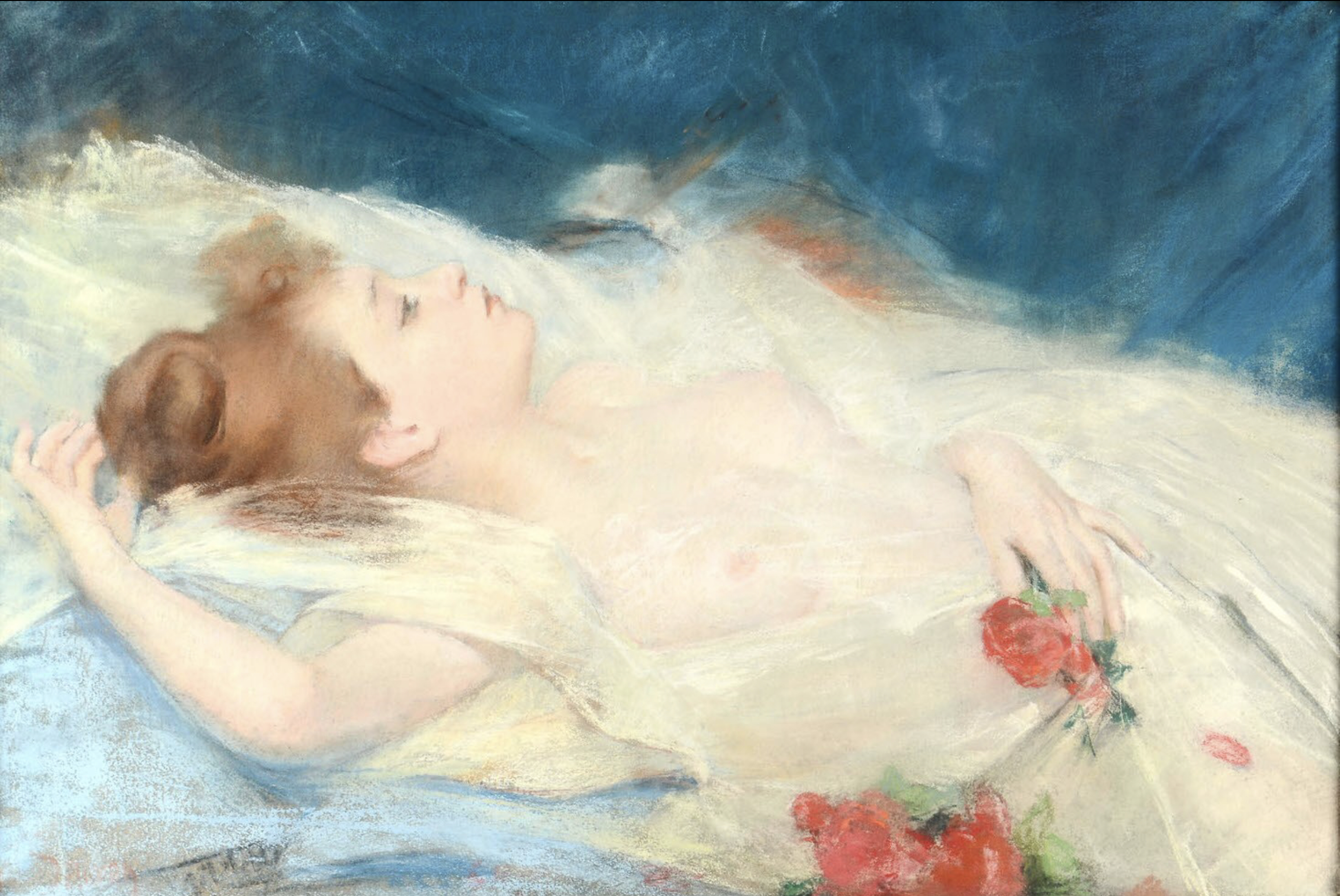
Femme Nue pastel on canvas
