= Francon (surname) =

Francon is a French surname. Notable people by that name include:

- Maurice Francon (1913–1996), French engineer and physicist.
- Mellie Francon (born 1982), Swiss snowboarder.
- Robert Francon, French philatelist and signatory to the Roll of Distinguished Philatelists.
- Aeneas Francon Williams (1886–1971), Minister of the Church of Scotland.
