= Church of Saint-Ignace, Paris =

Roman Catholic chapel in Paris, France

Saint-Ignace Church
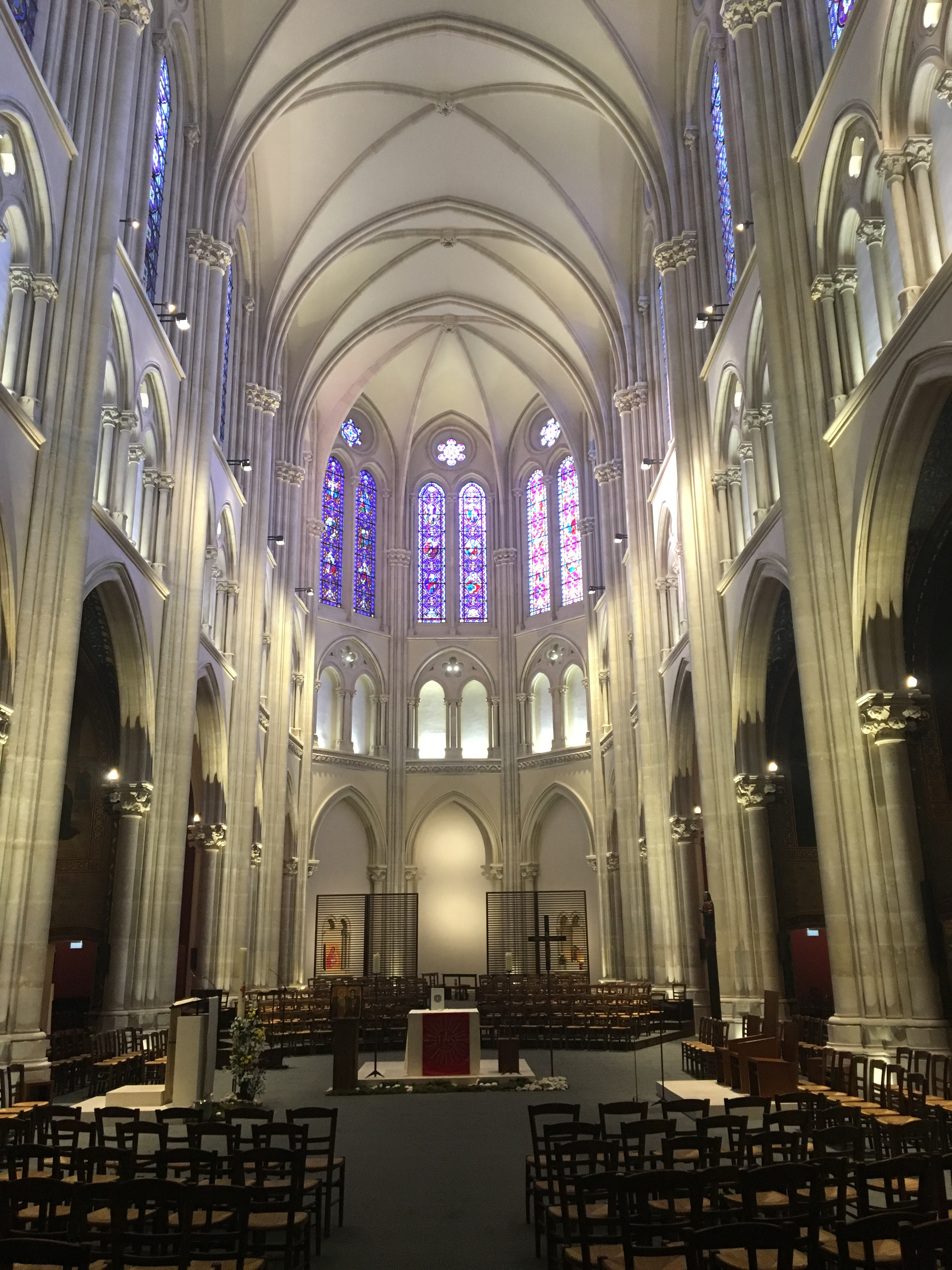
- Nave and choir of the church

Religion
- Affiliation: Roman Catholic Church
- Diocese: Roman Catholic Archdiocese of Paris
- Region: Île-de-France =
- Rite: Latin Rite
- Status: Active

Location
- Location: 6th arrondissement, Paris, France
- Interactive map of Saint-Ignace Church
- Coordinates: 48°51′02″N 2°19′35″E

Architecture
- Architect: Magloire Tournesac
- Style: Neo-Gothic

Website
- notredamedeschamps.fr

The Church of Saint-Ignace is a large Roman Catholic chapel located at 33 Rue de Sèvres in the 6th arrondissement of Paris. It is dedicated to Saint Ignace de Loyola, founder of Companions of Jesus, or Jesuits.

The church was built between 1855 and 1858, following the plans of the Jesuit father and architect Magloire Tournesac (1805–1875). It is built in the Neo-Gothic style.

Though it is not formally a parish church, the jesuit fathers carry out the liturgical and pastoral duties. The church is also connected with the Centre Sèvres, the faculty of philosophy and theology for the Jesuits of Paris.

Some of the art in the church depicts the martyrdom of Jesuit missionaries in Japan in the 1860s.

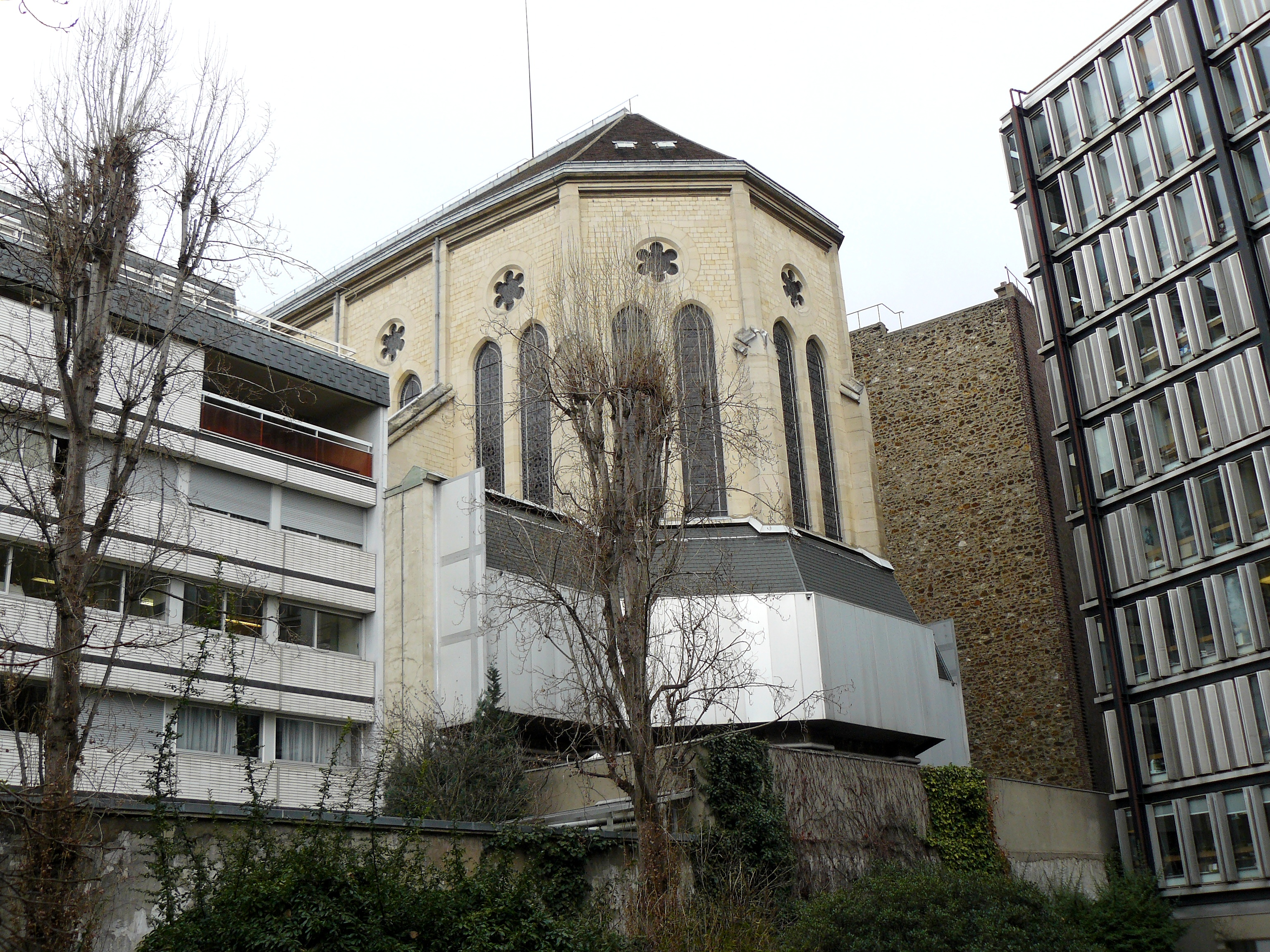
Chevet of the church

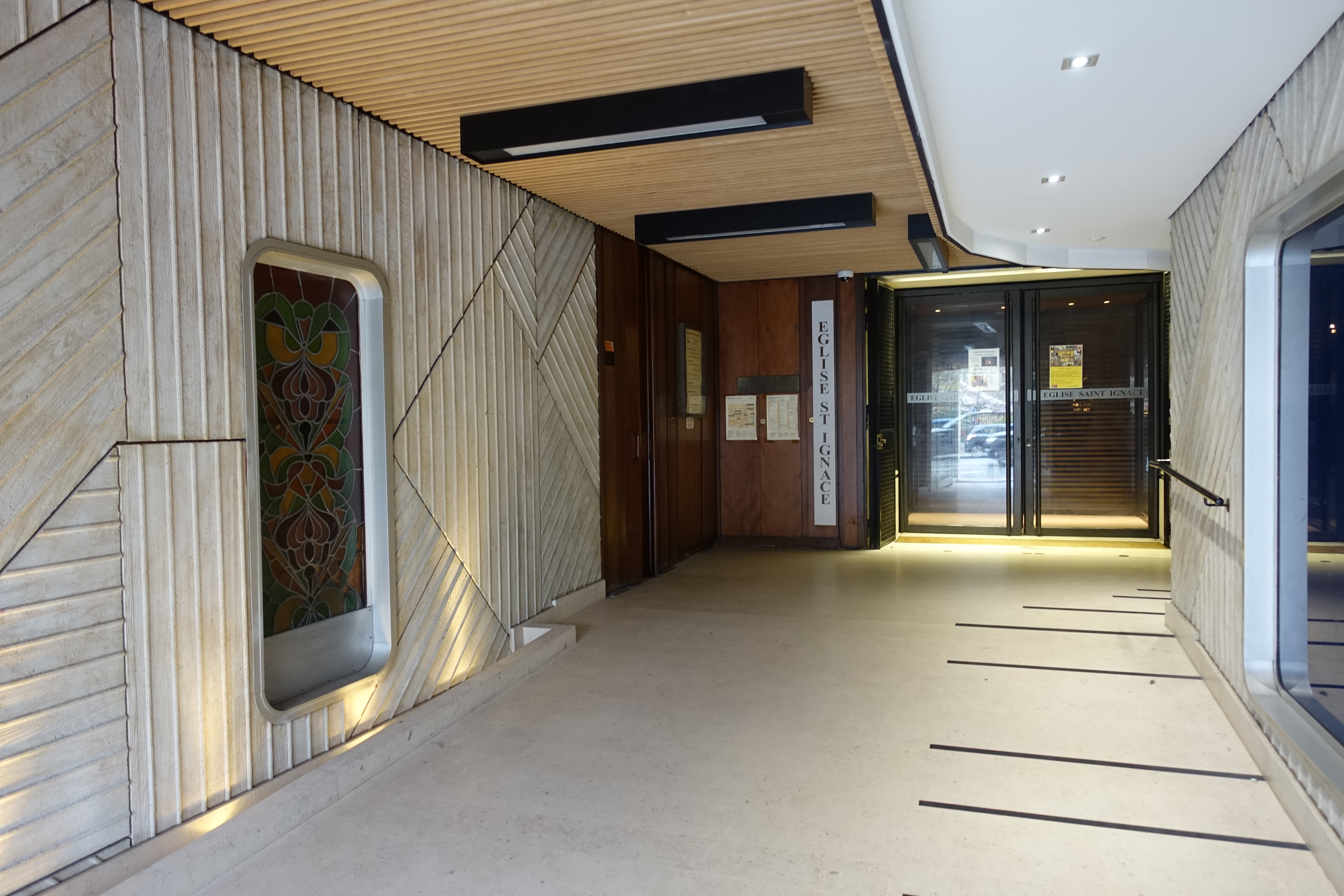
Church entrance at 33 Rue de Sèvres

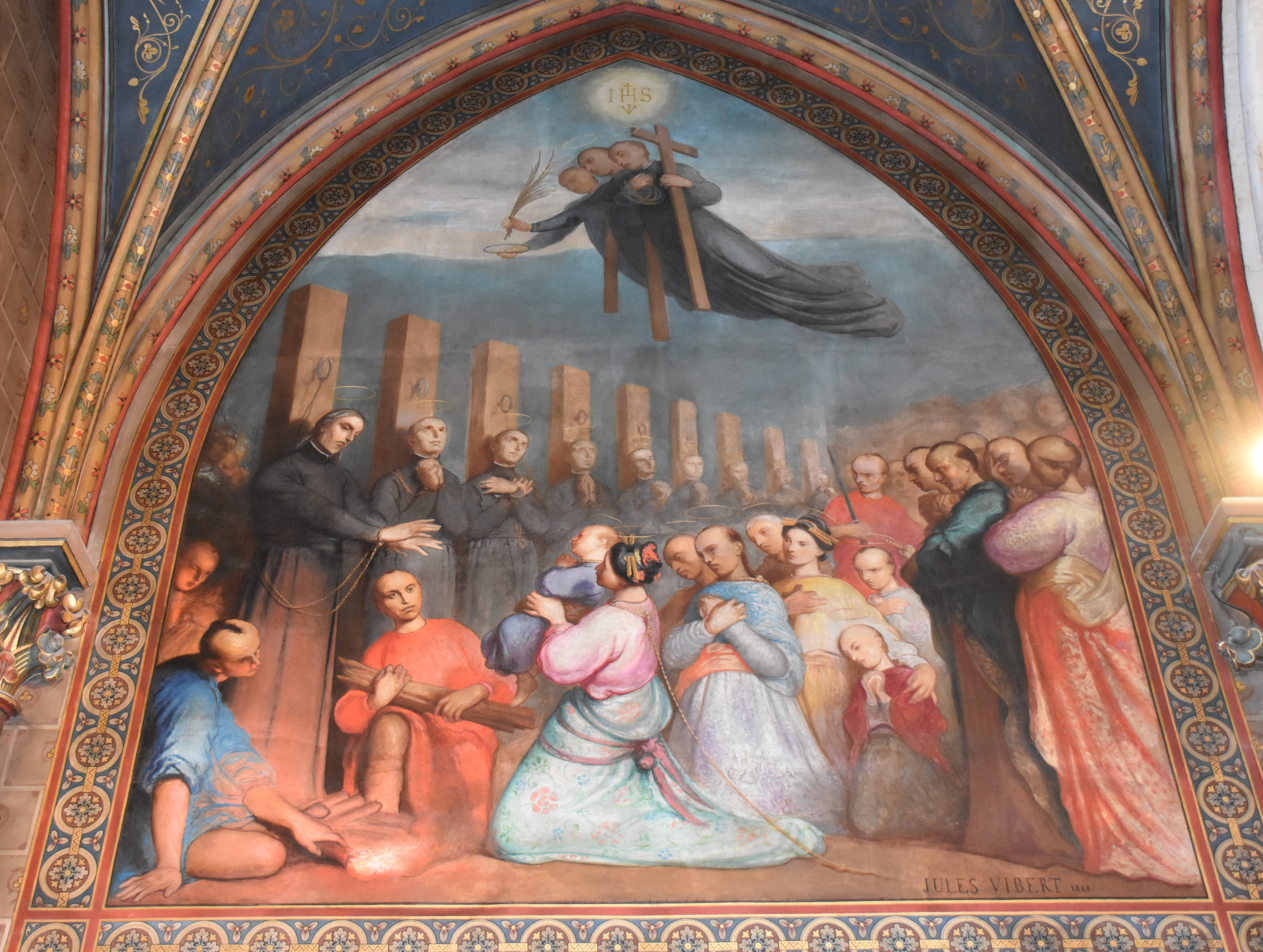
"Jesuit Martyrs in Japan"

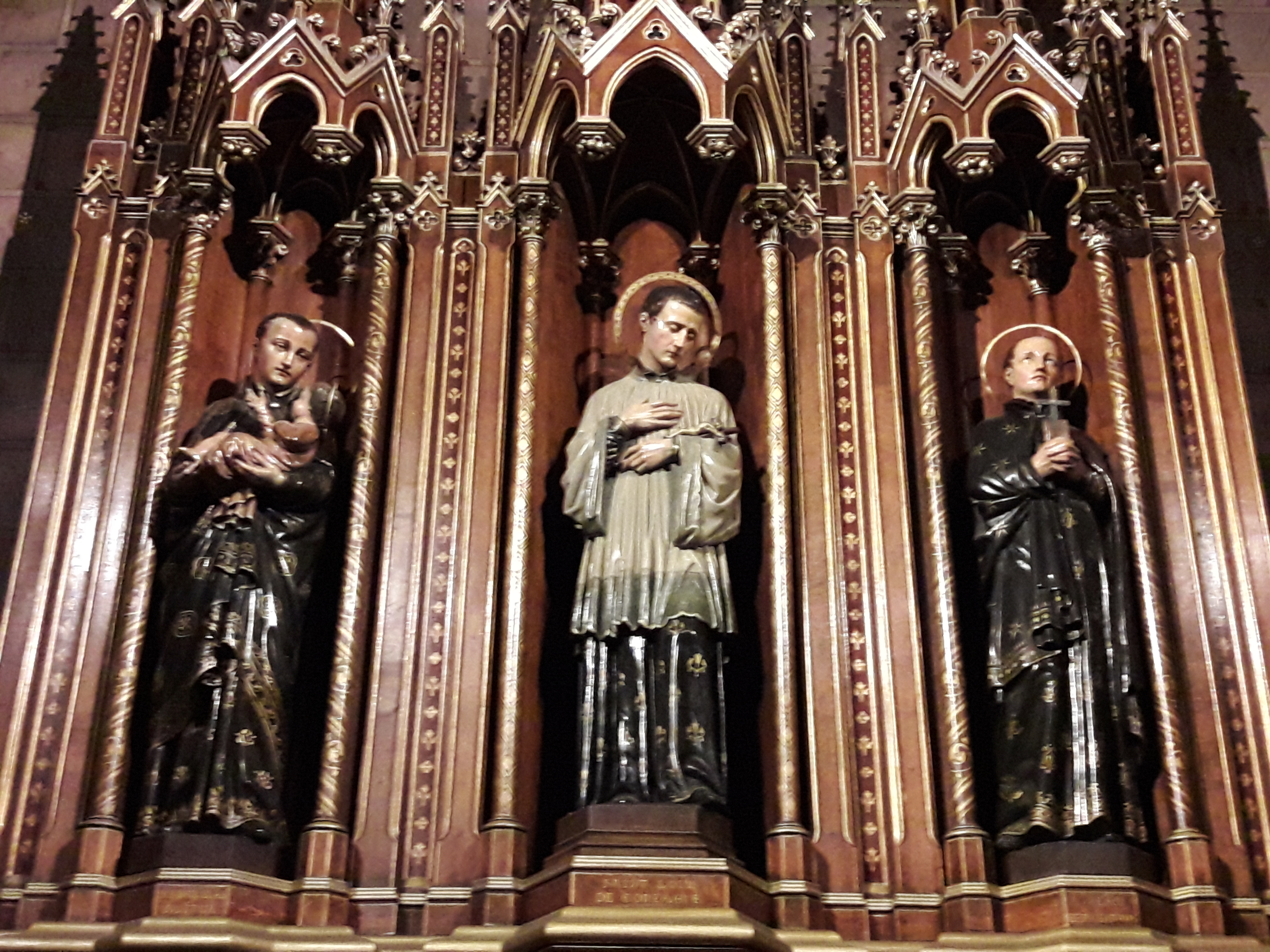
Statues of Jesuit saints Aloysius Gonzaga (fr: Louis Gonzague), Jan Berchmans et Stanislas Kostka in St Sculpture in the church
