= Wilbur Winfield Woodward =

American painter (1851–1882)

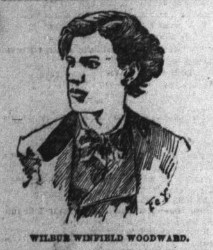
- Born: January 8, 1851; Saint Omer
- Died: March 18, 1882 (aged 31); Lawrenceburg
- Resting place: Spring Grove Cemetery
- Other names: Willie Woodward
- Education: École des Beaux-Arts
- Occupation: Painter, illustrator

Wilbur Winfield Woodward (January 8, 1851 – March 18, 1882) was an American painter.

== Early life ==
Woodward was born in St. Omer, Decatur County, Indiana on January 8, 1851 to Missouri and Charles A. Woodward. Shortly afterwards, they moved to St. Paul, Indiana. At the age of twelve, he accompanied his father, a volunteer in the 123rd Regiment. As a drummer, the younger Woodard was "accorded a place in the martial band of the regiment and with it march from Nashville to Chatatnooga [sic], and from there to Atlanta." He became a member of the veterans association, the Grand Army of the Republic. He returned to St. Paul until he was sixteen, when he moved with his parents to Greensburg, Indiana.

== Career ==
Woodward studied under Charles T. Webber while in his teens, then enrolled at the McMicken School of Design, Cincinnati upon its opening in 1869. After turning down the job offer as an assistant principal at McMicken in June 1871, Woodward moved to Europe where he studied for a year at Royal Academy of Fine Arts Antwerp. After moving to Paris, he studied under Gérôme and at the Académie Julien in Paris under Tony Robert-Fleury. He then returned to Cincinnati for a year as a teacher at the McMicken School of Design, before returning to Paris where he set up a studio. At the Salon of 1879 he exhibited Une cour de vieux Paris (A courtyard in old Paris), and in 1880 an Ossian, subtitled, Ossian, vieux et aveugle, restait avec la veuve de son fils, seul survivant d’une race royale et héroïque (Ossian, old and blind, left with the widow of his son, only survivor of a royal and heroic race), 67 x 116 cm. In both the 1879 and 1880 Salon catalogues Woodward is recorded living at 22, Rue Monsieur-le-Prince, located between the Odéon and the Sorbonne. No. 22 is a famous old building where other artists had studios and as it has an open courtyard this possibly served for Woodward’s 1879 Salon painting. Hicok Low paints a vivid picture of Woodward in Paris, describing him as one of the "types of the quarter" who would be seen wearing a sombrero, shoulder length black hair, thigh length cavalry boots, and playing his banjo where "memories of the Ohio would resound around the walls of this Paris studio." In Paris, in addition to painting, Woodward also worked a designer for French illustrated journals, and according to Low it was on commission from one of these to record the Yorktown Centennial Celebration in October 1881 that he returned and unfortunately died back in Indiana in 1882, at the young age of 31.

== Legacy ==
Smith in his The History of the state of Indiana of 1903 writes that "Wilbur Woodward, of Greenberg, gave promise of becoming one of the greatest painters in the world." Woodward’s father donated Springtime to the Indianapolis Museum of Art. As Woodward died so young his works are rare.A Girl removing fleas from a dog, which is signed and dated 1879, was sold in Metz in 2019. Two modello drawings by him, a ricordo of the previously mentioned Ossian, and Summer Evening, are in the collection of the Pennsylvania Academy of the Fine Arts. Nonetheless, Burnet wrote in 1921 that Woodward's work had been acquired by leading collectors in Cincinnati and New York, so more of his work may be discovered both in the United States and in France. Although the Ossian is untraced, the composition is also known through a contemporary press wood-engraving.

In 1961, the Life article, "Nudes are back" included a black and white photo of Woodward's Springtime.

== Gallery ==
=== Works by Woodward ===
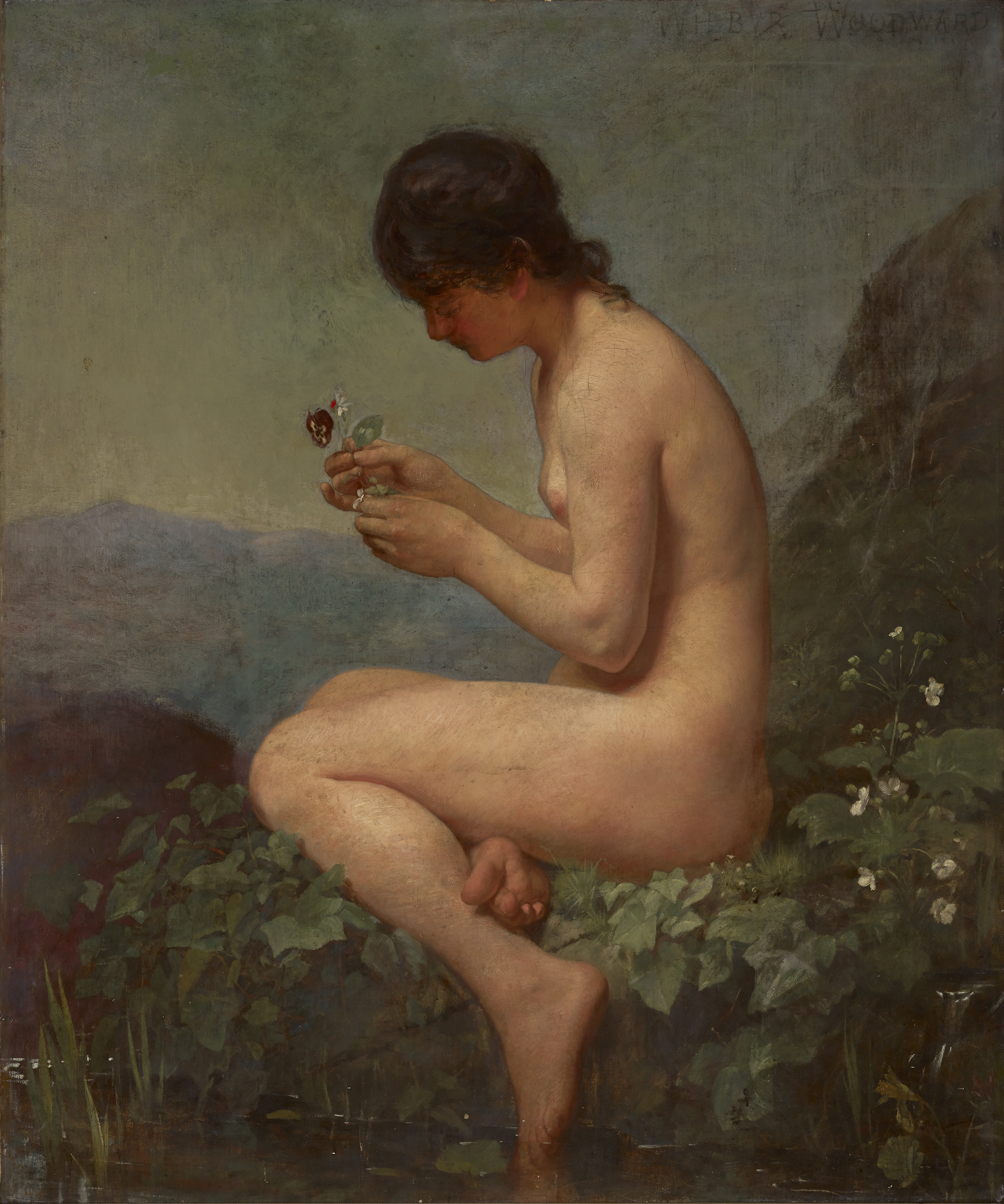
Springtime. Oil on canvas, 99 x 84 cm. Indianapolis Museum of Art.

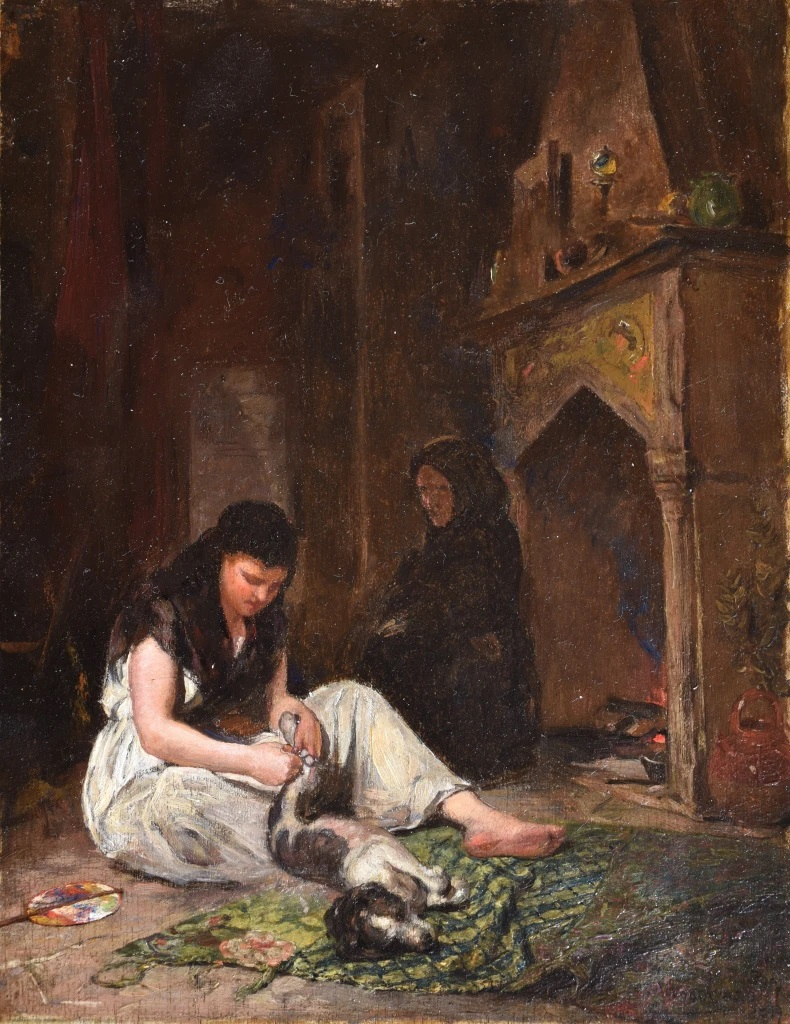
Girl Removing Fleas from a Dog. 1879. Oil on panel, 23 x 15 cm.

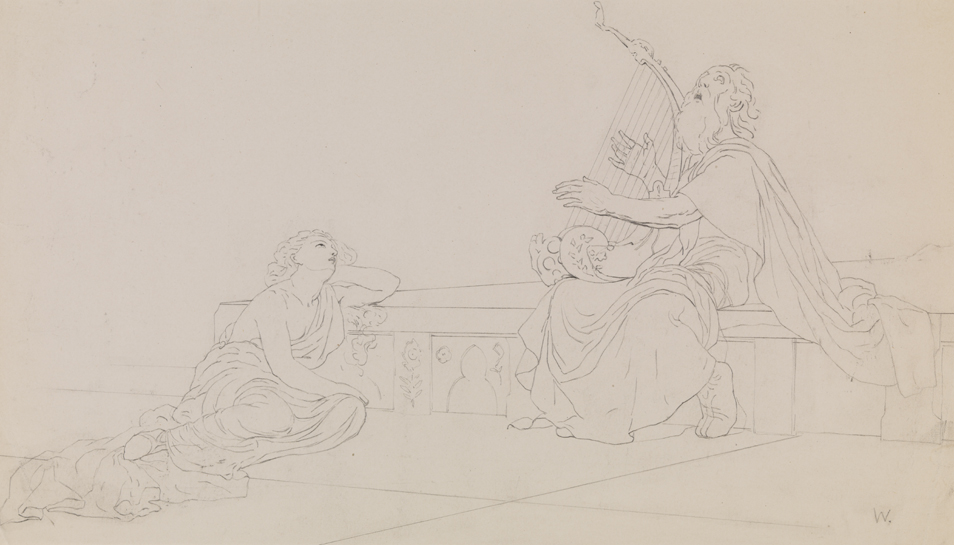
Ossian. Graphite on cream bristol board, 18.6 x 28.3 cm. Pennsylvania Academy of the Fine Arts.

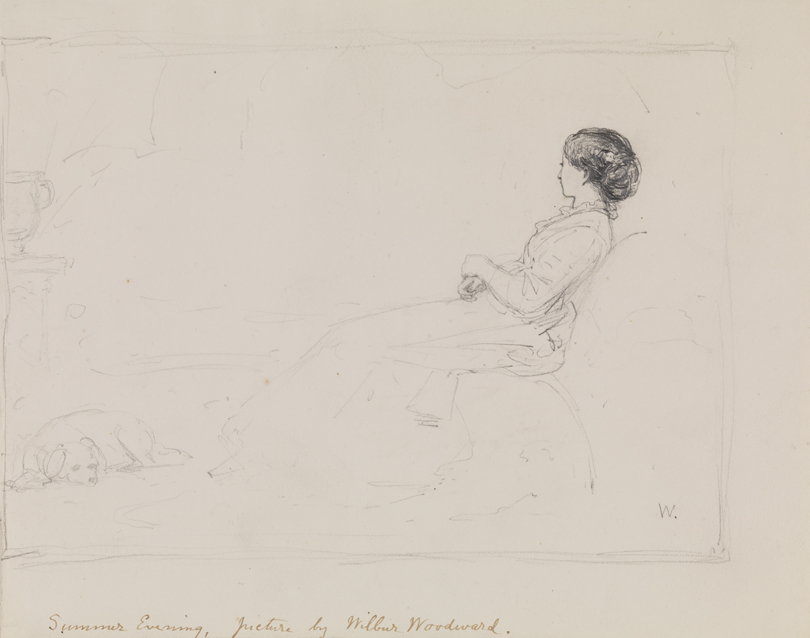
Summer Evening. Graphite on cream colored paper, 18.7 x 23.5 cm. Pennsylvania Academy of the Fine Arts.

=== Depictions of Woodward's work ===
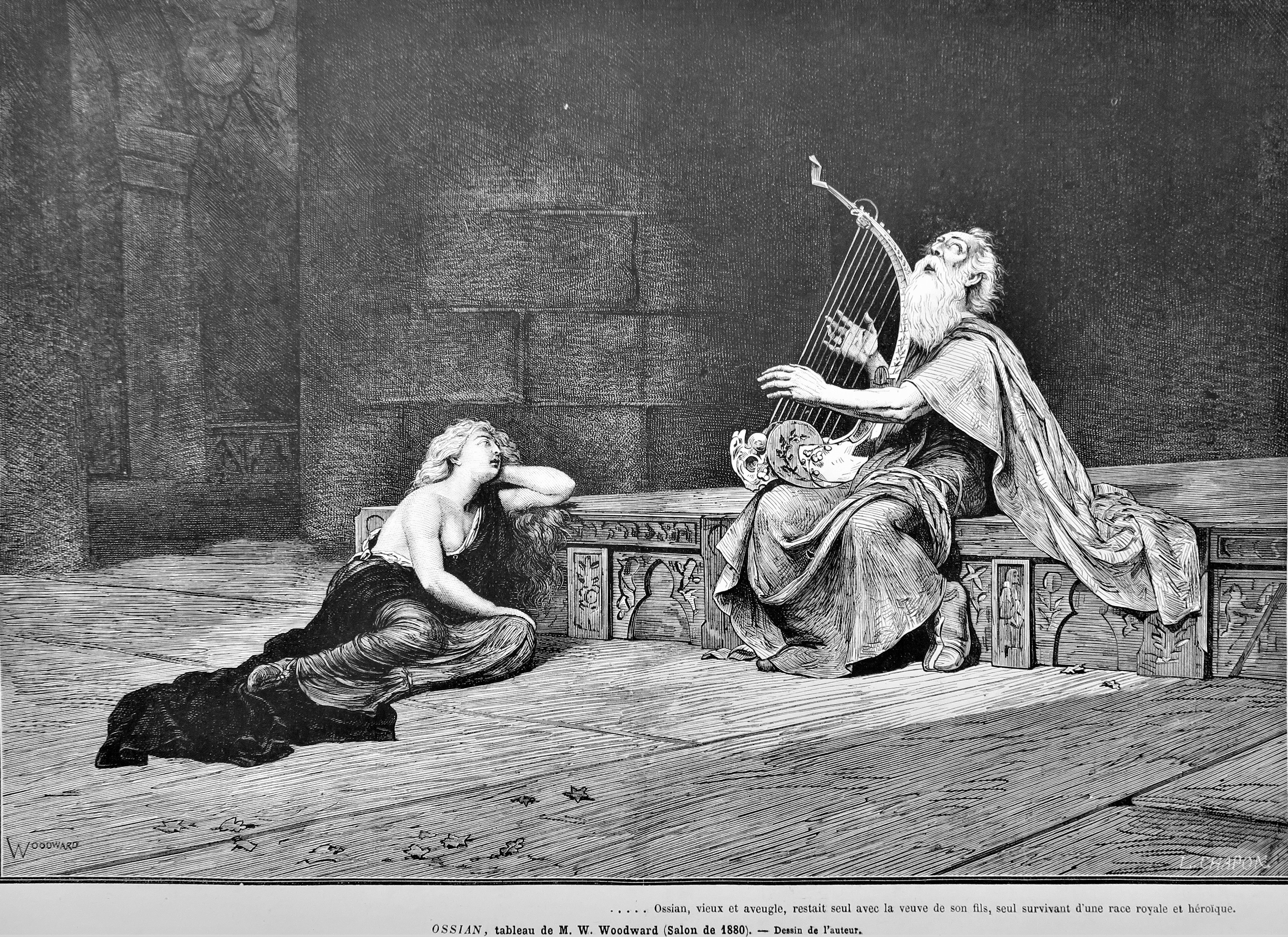
Wood engraving by Woodward of his painting, Ossian, exhibited at Paris Salon of 1880

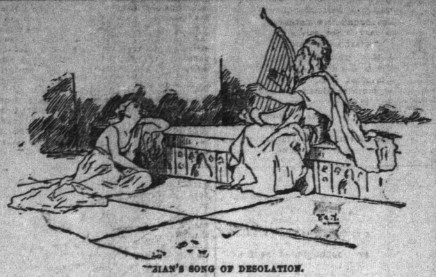
Sketch of Woodward's Ossian.

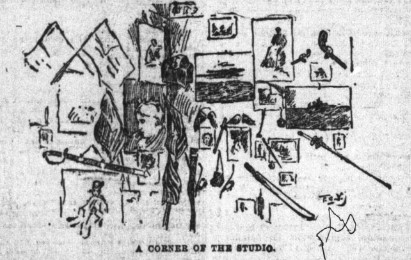
Sketch of Woodward's studio after his death in 1882.

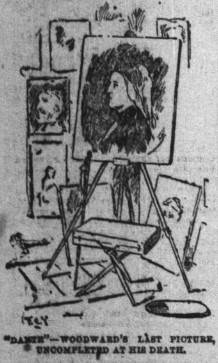
Sketch of Woodward's unfinished final painting, Dante (1882).
