= Musée – Librairie du Compagnonnage =

French museum

Coordinates: 48°51′8″N 2°20′6″E

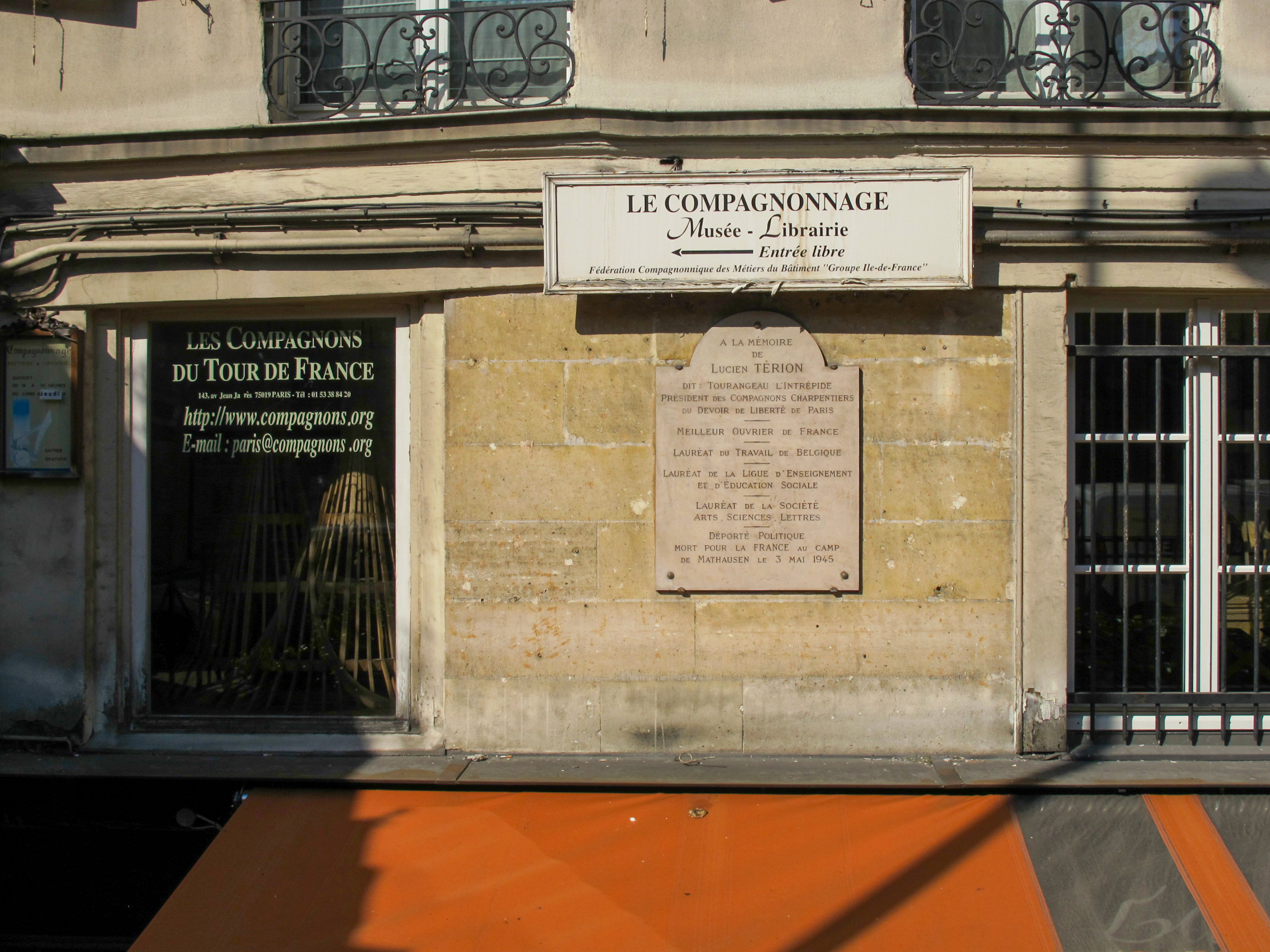
Exterior of the museum

The Musée – Librairie du Compagnonnage (French pronunciation: [myze libʁɛʁi dy kɔ̃paɲɔnaʒ]) is a museum devoted to French trade guilds. It is located in the 6th arrondissement at 10, rue Mabillon, Paris, France, and open weekday afternoons; entry is free.

The museum is operated by the Compagnons du Tour de France in the former seat of the Compagnons Charpentiers du Devoir de Liberté ("Indiens"), and documents the history of French trade guilds (French: compagnonnage) from their medieval origins to the present day. It contains artifacts, tools, photographs, and documents pertaining to these diverse associations of skilled craftsmen in fields such as cooking, pastry, plumbing, ironworks, masonry, cabinetmaking, carpentry, etc. Since medieval times, these craftsmen have made a Tour de France as they acquire their knowledge from masters (maîtres) and progress from apprenti to compagnon and perhaps ultimately to maître. To become a master of the Compagnons du Devoir (founded 1347), each must create a masterpiece (chef d'œuvre) which is then judged by a college of masters; the museum contains some of these impressive pieces.

== See also ==
- List of museums in Paris
