= Agricol Perdiguier =

French joiner, author, and politician

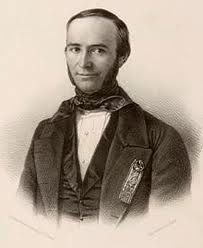
- Born: 3 December 1805; Morières-lès-Avignon, Vaucluse, France
- Died: 26 March 1875 (aged 69); Paris, France
- Occupations: Carpenter, author and politician
- Known for: Mémoires d'un compagnon

Agricol Perdiguier (3 December 1805 – 26 March 1875) was a French joiner, (Note: Joiner. The French term menuisier is sometimes also translated as "carpenter", but Perdiguier's trade was a skilled branch of woodworking that included the detailed finishing work in a house. He would have made doors and windows, staircases, cabinets and paneling.) author and politician. He was known for his writings on the compagnons, or members of workers' brotherhoods, in which he preached peaceful relations between the brotherhoods, and the intellectual and moral improvement of their members. He became a deputy after the 1848 revolution, and was forced into exile after Napoleon III took power in 1851. His last years were spent in obscurity and poverty.

== Early years ==
Agricol Perdiguier was born in Morières-lès-Avignon, Vaucluse on 3 December 1805, the seventh of nine children. His father was a joiner and his mother a seamstress. The family was relatively well off, since his father also owned fields and vineyards, and put his children to work. During the French Revolution in 1789 his father joined the Avignon volunteers, and reached the rank of captain in the Army of Italy.

Agricol grew up speaking the Occitan language of Le Midi, very different from the French of the north. He had a basic schooling for two or three years, and learned to read, write and do arithmetic. He learned French, but did not learn how to pronounce it correctly. After the Bourbon Restoration of 1815 his father went into hiding to escape the Second White Terror and was later arrested. The White Terror was particularly severe in the southeast of France and strongly affected Agricol Perdiguier. He was persecuted for having supported Napoleon during the Hundred Days although only a child of ten at the time.

== Carpenter ==
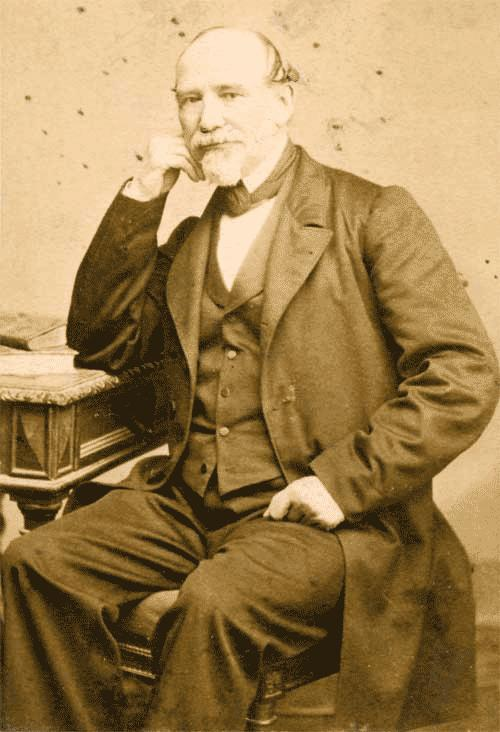
Agricol Perdiguier towards the end of his life

Perdiguier's father decreed that Agricol would become a carpenter when he was 13 or 14. In 1822 he was sent to work for a year with a friend of his father, a carpenter in Avignon. He then went to work for M. Poussin, another friend of his father. Both of his masters belonged to societies of compagnons, or crafts guilds, and M. Poussin advised Perdiguier to join one. In 1823 he was hired by M. Ponson, who advised him to make a Tour de France, a form of apprenticeship where an artisan works for a series of different masters in different locations. Perdiguier also began to learn to draw.

Agricol Perdiguier undertook his tour of France from 1824 to 1828. He left Avignon on 20 April 1824 bound for Marseille. He became a compagnon on All Saints Day in Montpellier under the name of Avignonnais-la-vertu. He was elected a full compagnon in Chartres, then a first compagnon in Lyon on Christmas 1827. He left Lyon on 17 August 1828 after eleven months in that city, and reached Morières on 24 August 1828.

== Public figure ==
During his tour Perdiguier taught himself by reading the classical authors, and learned about the different places he visited. He wrote about the need for reconciliation of the different societies, which were sometimes engaged in bitter and bloody fights. He also wanted intellectual and moral improvement of compagnons, and of the working classes in general. In 1839 he published his writings as Le livre du compagnonnage (The book of the brotherhoods). Much of the book consists of songs and texts preaching brotherhood. His message influenced writers such as George Sand and Eugène Sue.

He was initiated to Freemasonry on March 17, 1846, at "Hospital of Palestine", a Supreme Council of France lodge in Paris.

After the French Revolution of 1848, Perdiguier was elected to the Constituent Assembly on 29 April 1848 for both Vaucluse and the Seine. He chose the Seine. In this election, only 285 out of 851 of the new deputies had been republicans before the revolution, and only six candidates of the radical republicans were elected. They were Ferdinand Flocon, Martin, Blanc, Caussidière, Ledru-Rollin and Agricol Perdiguier. Perdiguier was re-elected to the Legislative Assembly on 13 March 1849. He sat with the moderate left, and defended limits to the length of work days against the Conservatives. After the coup of 2 December 1851 in which Napoleon III seized power, Perdiguier was among the proscribed Republicans. He was arrested at his home, and on 9 January 1852 was expelled from the country.

== Last years ==
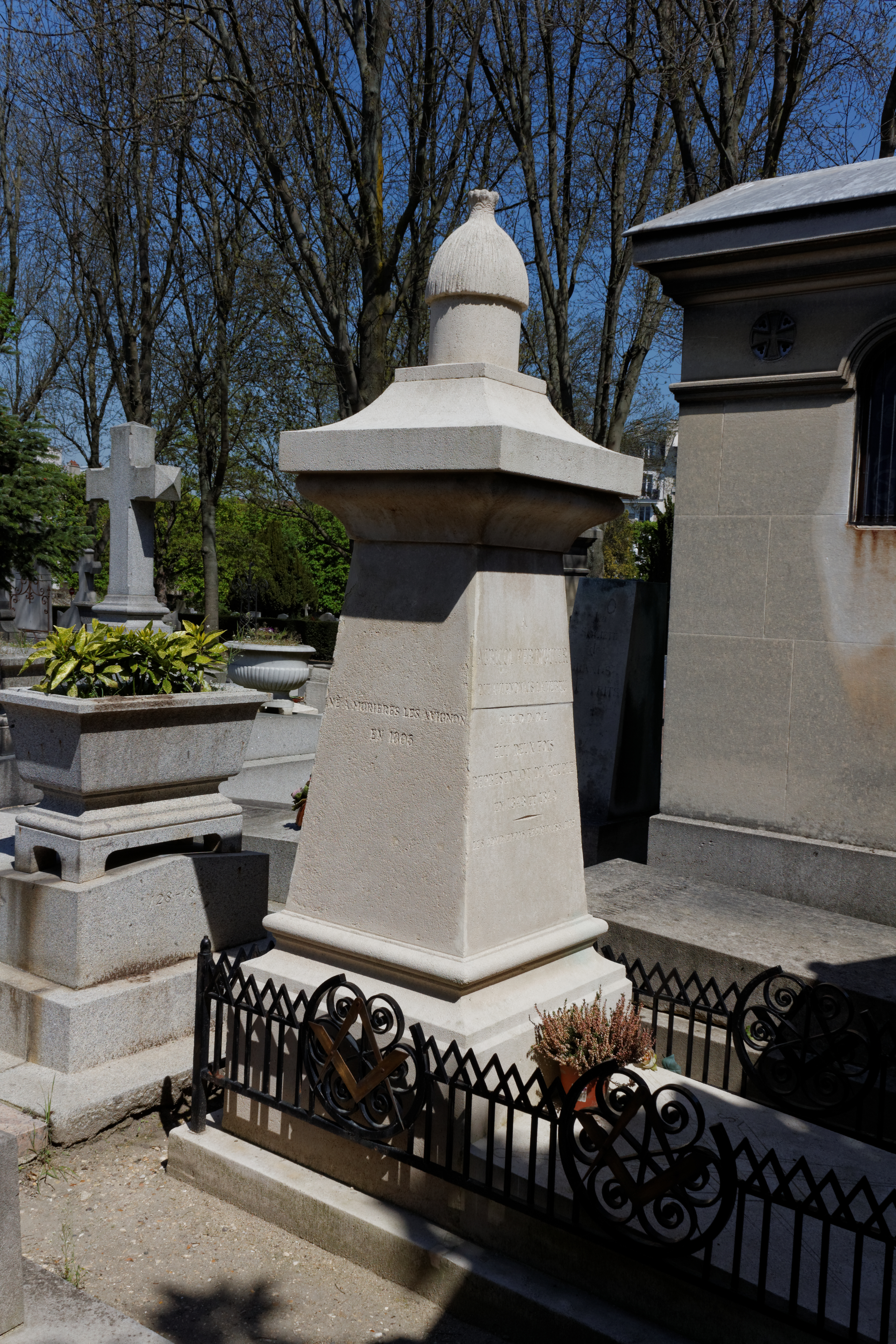
Grave of Perdiguier in Père-Lachaise - Division 85

Perdiguier spent some time in Belgium and then Geneva. He drafted his autobiography in Antwerp in 1852, and it was serialized in a Swiss magazine. Mémoires d'un compagnon (Memoirs of a Compagnon) appeared as a book in 1854 and was immediately acclaimed, becoming the best known autobiography of a worker in French. The book describes his journey around France as a young journeyman, discusses the architecture of the cities he lived in, and gives anecdotes that illustrate the everyday life of a journeyman, which he had already described in his Livre du Compagnonnage. He also describes the quarrels between the different brotherhoods, and gives his views on morality and politics. His account provides a valuable record of the worker's brotherhoods of the time, and has been reprinted many times.

Perdiguier returned to France in December 1855, and opened a small bookshop in Paris. In 1863 he undertook a third tour of France, visiting Avignon and Morières. The last years of his life were difficult, and spent in obscurity. Perdiguier remained a Republican and a deist. During the defense of Paris in 1871 he was appointed deputy mayor of the 12th arrondissement. He was hostile to the Paris Commune. He died of a stroke in Paris on 26 March 1875, in a state of destitution. He is buried in the Père-Lachaise Cemetery.

== Publications ==
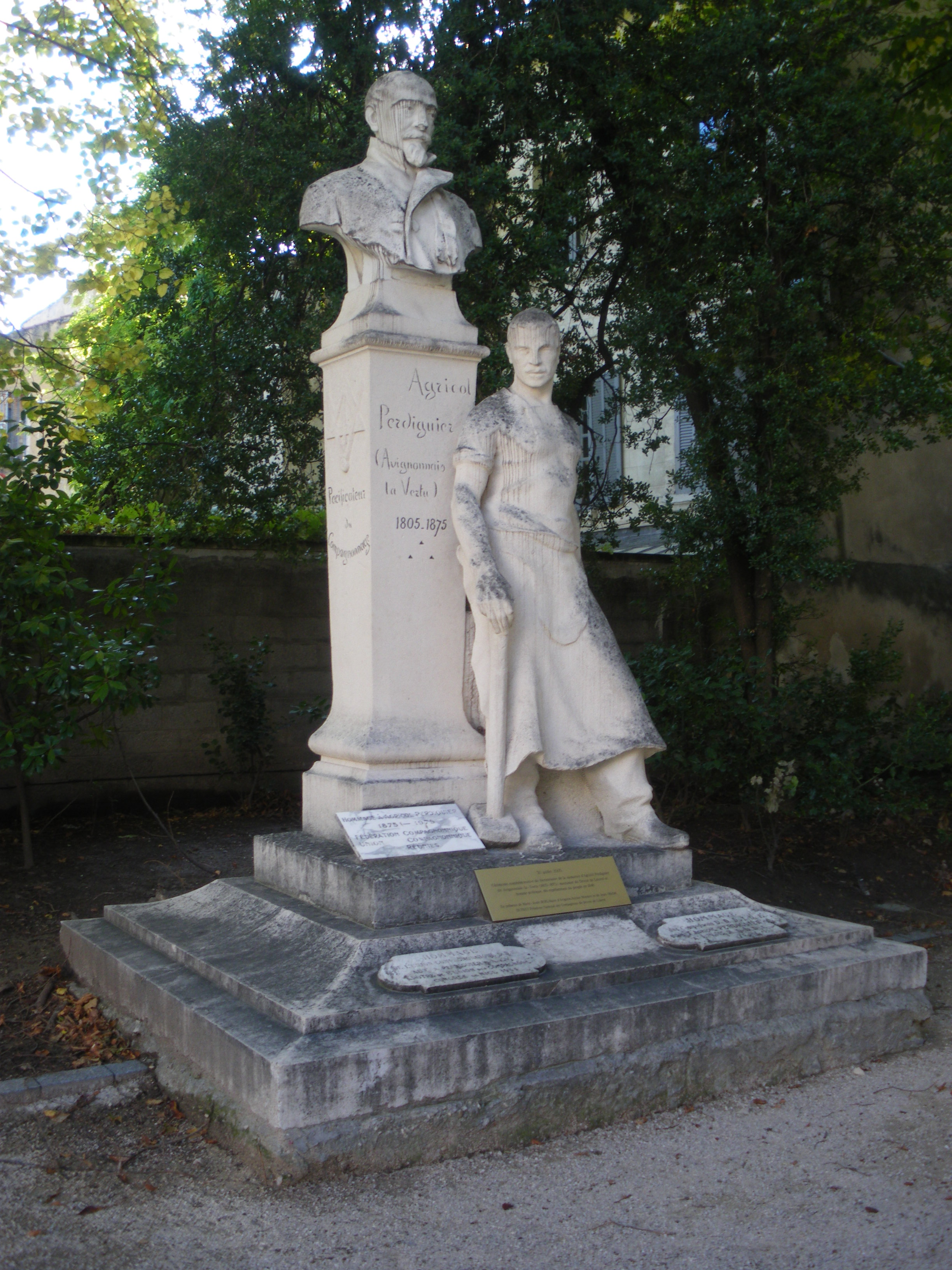
Statue of Agricol Perdiguier, Square Agricol in Avignon

Songs

- Le Départ des compagnons
- Adieu au pays
- Les Voyageurs (chanson du Tour de France)
- Salomon (fondateur des Compagnons du Devoir de Liberté)
- Le Compagnon content de peu

Poetry

- La Rencontre de deux frères

Technical works

- Dialogue sur l'architecture
- Raisonnement sur le trait

Works on compagnons

- Notice sur le Compagnonnage
- Le Livre du Compagnonnage (1838, 2nd edition 1841, 3rd edition 1857)
- Biographie de l'auteur du livre du compagnonnage et réflexions diverses ou complément de l'histoire d'une scission dans le compagnonnage (1846)
- Mémoires d'un Compagnon, éditions Duchamp (2 volumes 1854–55)
- Maître Adam, menuisier à Nevers (1863)
- Question vitale sur le Compagnonnage et la classe ouvrière (1863)
- Le Compagnonnage illustré (avec quatre lithographies sur la réconciliation des Compagnons)

History

- Histoire démocratique des peuples anciens et modernes in 12 volumes (only 7 appeared, between 1849 and 1851)

Theater

- Les Gavots et les Devoirans

Politics

- Despotisme et Liberté
- Peuple de France reste debout
- Allemands, daignez réfléchir
- Comment constituer la République (1871 – articles that appeared in Le National during the siege of the Commune of Paris)
- Patriotisme et modération
- Conseil d'un ami aux républicains
- La vérité sur le pape et les prêtres
- Que devient, que deviendra la France (1874 – his last publication)

== Sources ==
- D., Christine (2005-11-08). "PERDIGUIER Agricol (1805-1875)". Association des Amis et Passionnés du Père-Lachaise. Archived from the original on 2015-05-04.
- Guiral, Pierre (2014). "PERDIGUIER AGRICOL". Encyclopaedia Universalis.
- Harsin, Jill (2002). Barricades: The War of the Streets in Revolutionary Paris, 1830-1848. Palgrave Macmillan. ISBN 978-0-312-29479-3.
- "Les mémoires d'un compagnon, par agricol perdiguier". etudier.
- Mathonière, Jean-Michel (2006). "Agricol Perdiguier, premier historien du compagnonnage français". Provence Historique. 56. Marseille: Fédération historique de Provence. Archived from the original on 2015-03-07.
- Traugott, Mark (1993). "Agricol Perdiguier". The French Worker: Autobiographies from the Early Industrial Era. University of California Press. ISBN 978-0-520-07932-8.
