= La Palette =

Café and historic site in Paris, France

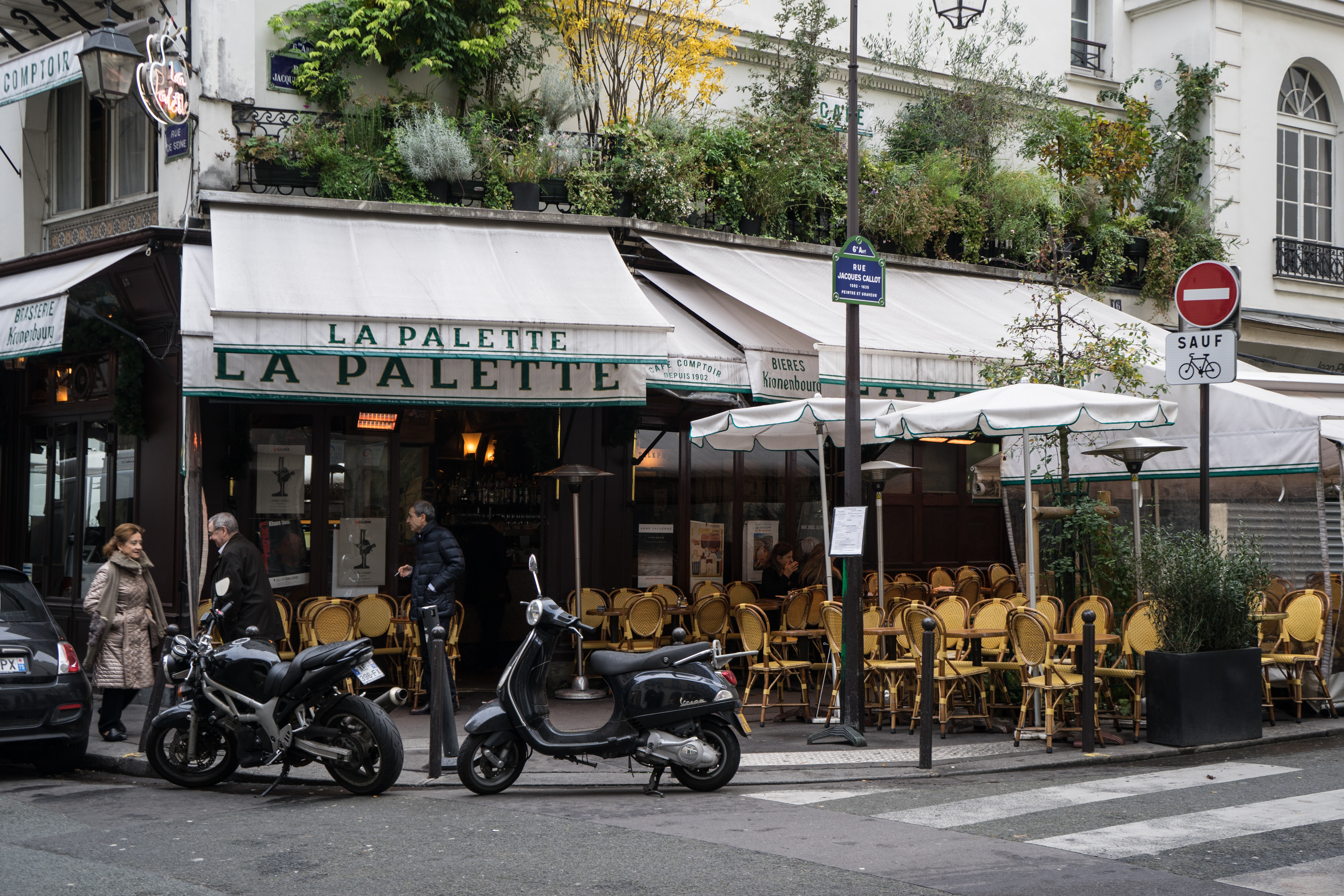
- La Palette in the corner of Rue Jacques-Callot and Rue de Seine

- Location within Paris
- 48°51′19″N 2°20′13″E
- Type: Café
- Location: 43, Rue de Seine & 18, Rue Jacques-Callot; 6th arrondissement of Paris; France

Monument historique
- Official name: Café La Palette
- Designated: 23 May 1984
- Reference no.: PA00088495

La Palette is a café and brasserie-type restaurant in the 6th arrondissement of Paris, France. It is listed as a monument historique since 1984.

== History ==
The café was bought by Jean Louis Hilbert between the two wars and took the name La Palette in 1950. The café was originally and still is a gathering place for students of the nearby Fine Arts National Higher School. La Palette's front window and back room were listed as a Historical Monument on 23 May 1984.

== Interior ==
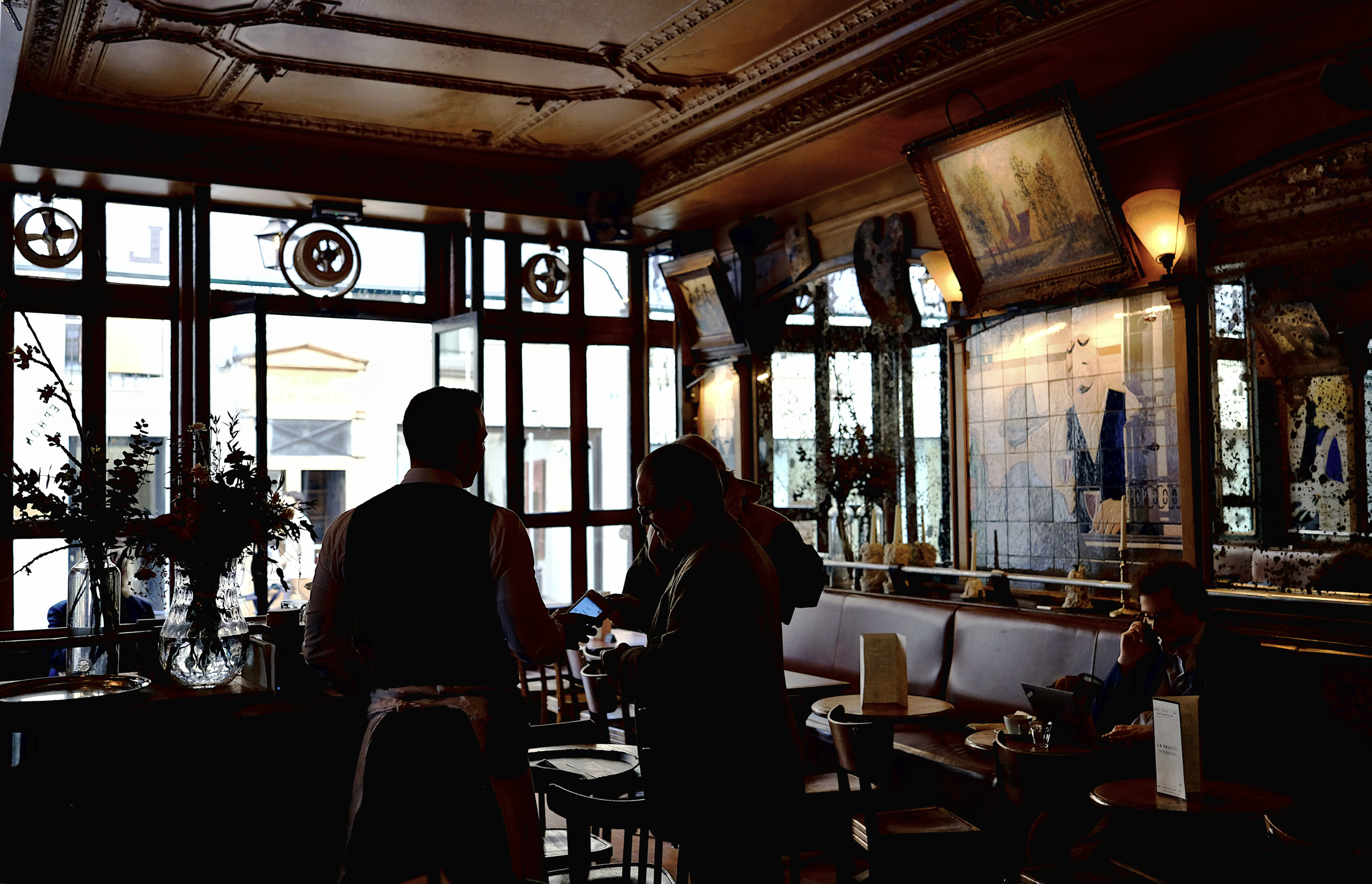
The back-room.

The establishment has two rooms: the tiny bar room, and the larger back room (which used to be a billiard hall) that is adorned with ceramics of the 1930–40s and numerous paintings.

== Notable patrons ==
Paul Cézanne, Pablo Picasso and Georges Braque were among the regular patrons. More recently, La Palette became a trendy place and attracted Parisian youth as well as tourists. Former French President Jacques Chirac was a regular patron of La Palette.

== In popular culture ==
In Paul Auster's novel Invisible (2009), the main character went to La Palette several times. The café's bar room served as a filming location for Taylor Swift's "Begin Again" music video (2012).

== Location ==
The café is located close to station Mabillon of Paris Métro Line 10.

== Gallery ==
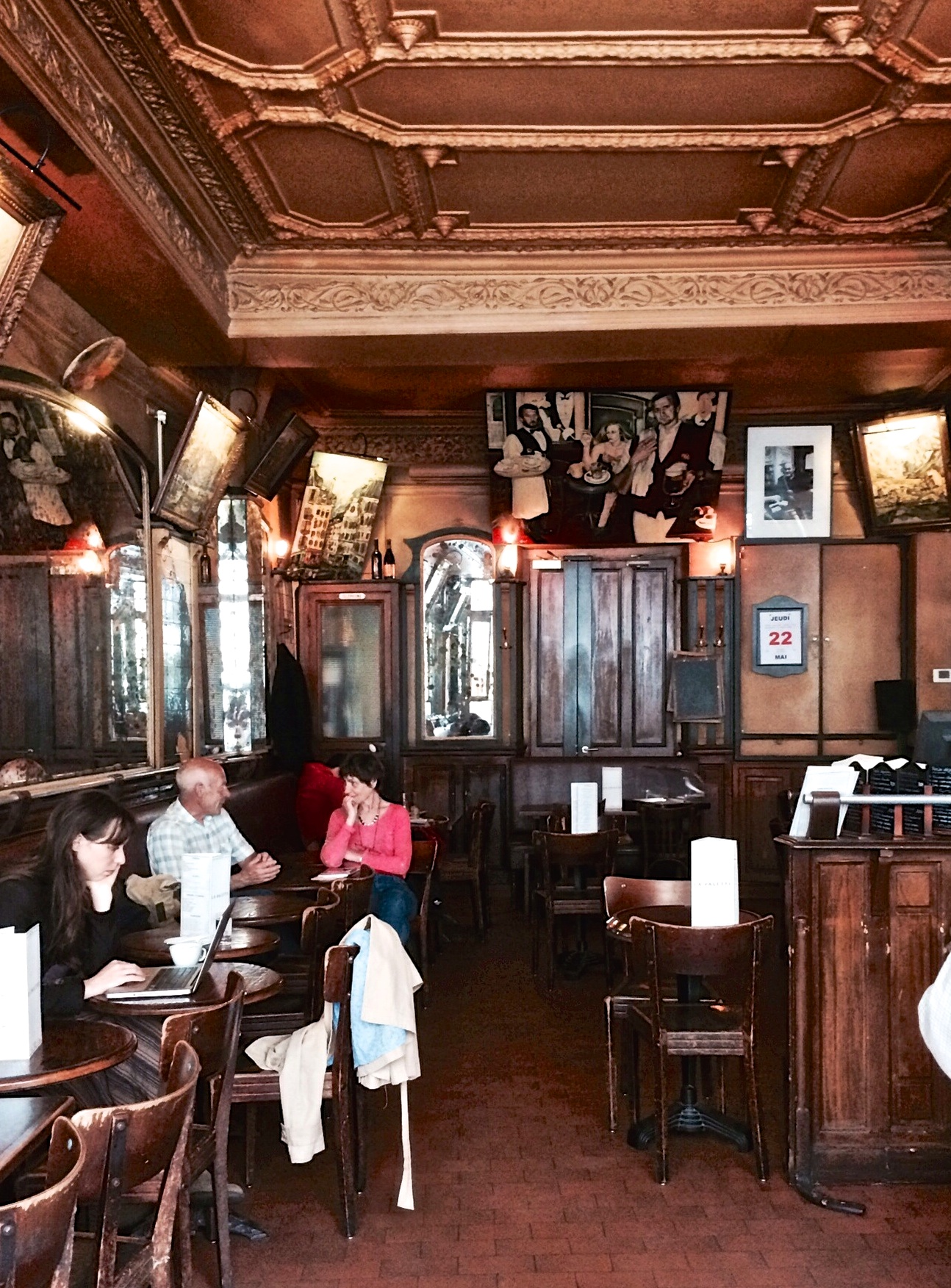
The bar room

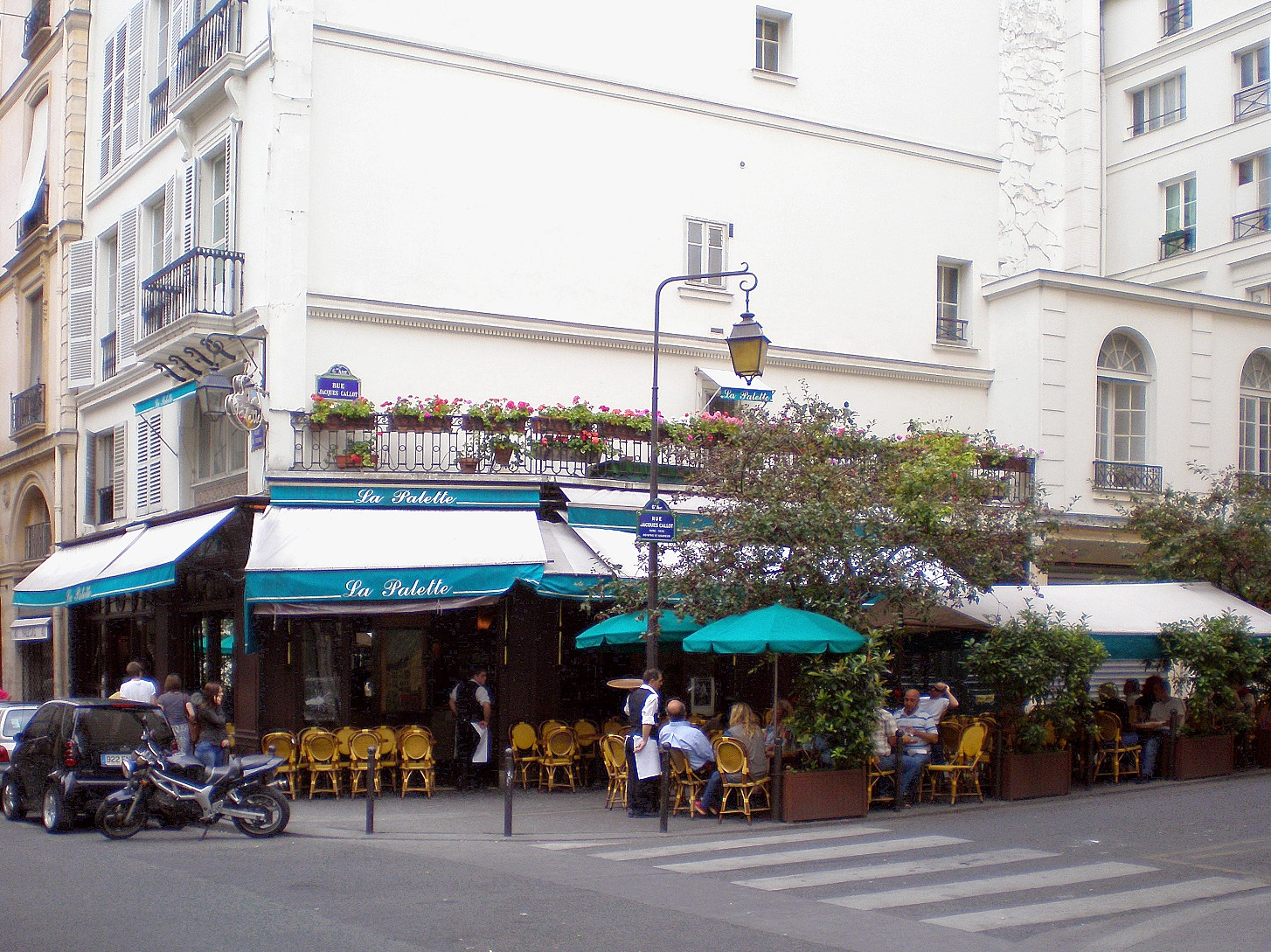
The terrace

== See also ==
- List of monuments historiques in Paris
