= Maison d'Auguste Comte =

Writer's house museum in Paris, France

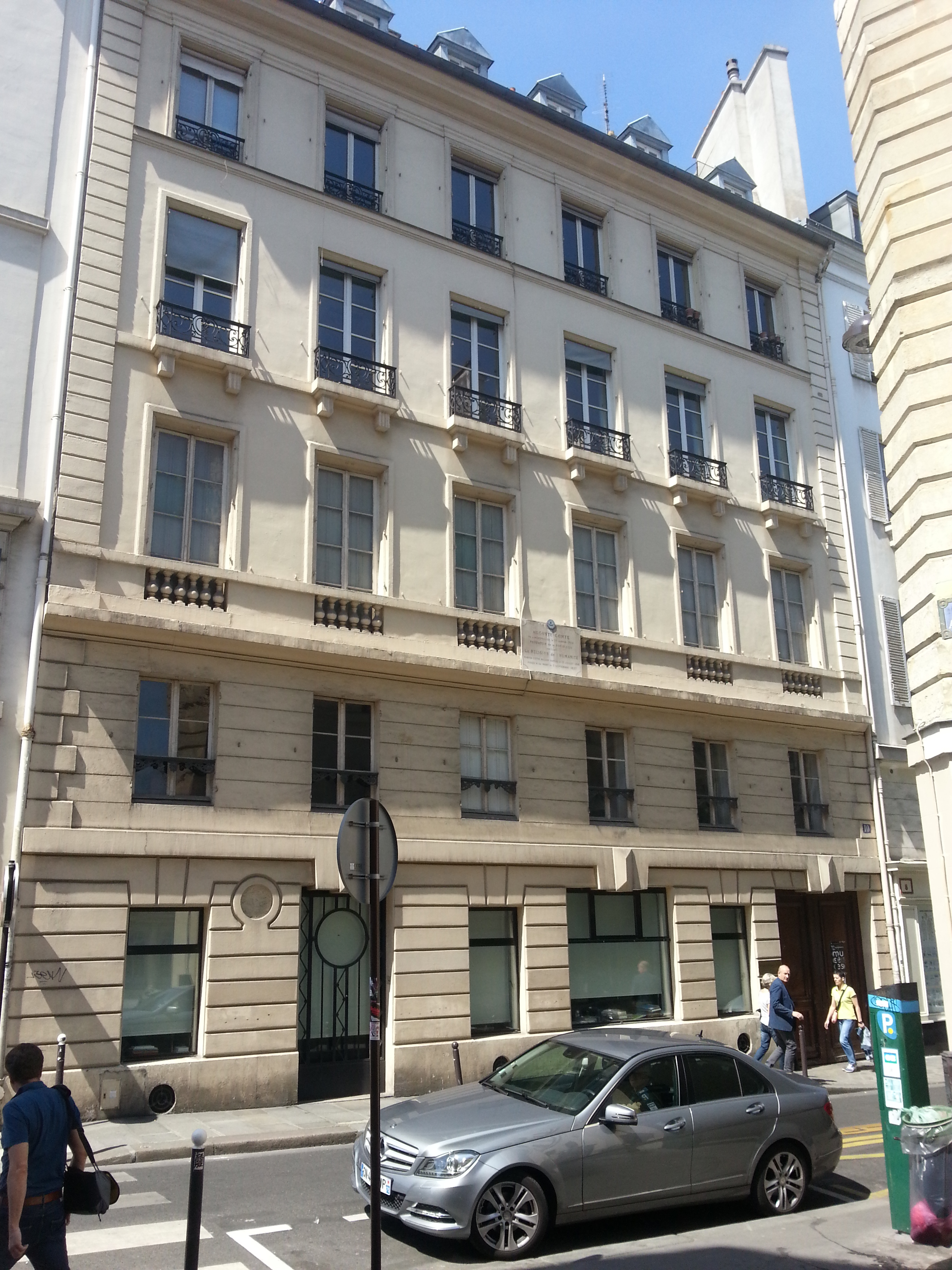
Exterior of the museum

The Maison d'Auguste Comte (French pronunciation: [mɛzɔ̃ doɡyst kɔ̃t]), also known as the Musée Auguste Comte, is a private writer's house museum and archive dedicated to positivist philosopher Auguste Comte (1798–1857). It is maintained by the Association internationale Auguste Comte, located in the 6th arrondissement at 10, rue Monsieur-le-Prince, Paris, France, and open Wednesday afternoons, with a guided tour at 3:30 p.m.; an admission fee is required. The closest Paris Métro station is Odéon.

Comte lived on the 2nd floor of 10, rue Monsieur le Prince from 1841 to his death in 1857, where he wrote the four volumes of Système de politique positive (1851–1854), his last treatise of positivist philosophy. The apartment has subsequently been restored and reconstructed as it was at the philosopher's death. It consists of five main rooms (dining room, living room, study, classroom, bedroom) with vestibule, and contains Comte's writing desk, portraits of Clotilde de Vaux and various disciples, personal effects, and handwritten letters, as well as a library of positivist writings that contains about 600 books in French, including first editions of his works, 250 books in other languages, a thousand brochures, and four collections of periodicals.

Since 2017, a cultural program has been established at the Maison d'Auguste Comte. Philo cafés, concerts, plays, thematic visits and conferences follow one another regularly.

== See also ==
- List of museums in Paris

== Sources ==
- Maison d'Auguste Comte
- WebCity description (French)
- ParisInfo entry
- Auguste Comte, 1798–1857: Correspondence Conservee Aux Archives Positivistes De La Maison D'Auguste Comte Inventaire, Bibliothèque Nationale (France), 1984. ISBN 978-2-7177-1688-7.
- Bruno Gentil, "La maison d'Auguste Comte: Témoin de l'histoire du positivisme", Bulletin de la Société des amis de la bibliothèque de l'Ecole polytechnique, no. 30, pp. 21–38, 2002. ISSN 0989-3059.
