= Société des poètes français =

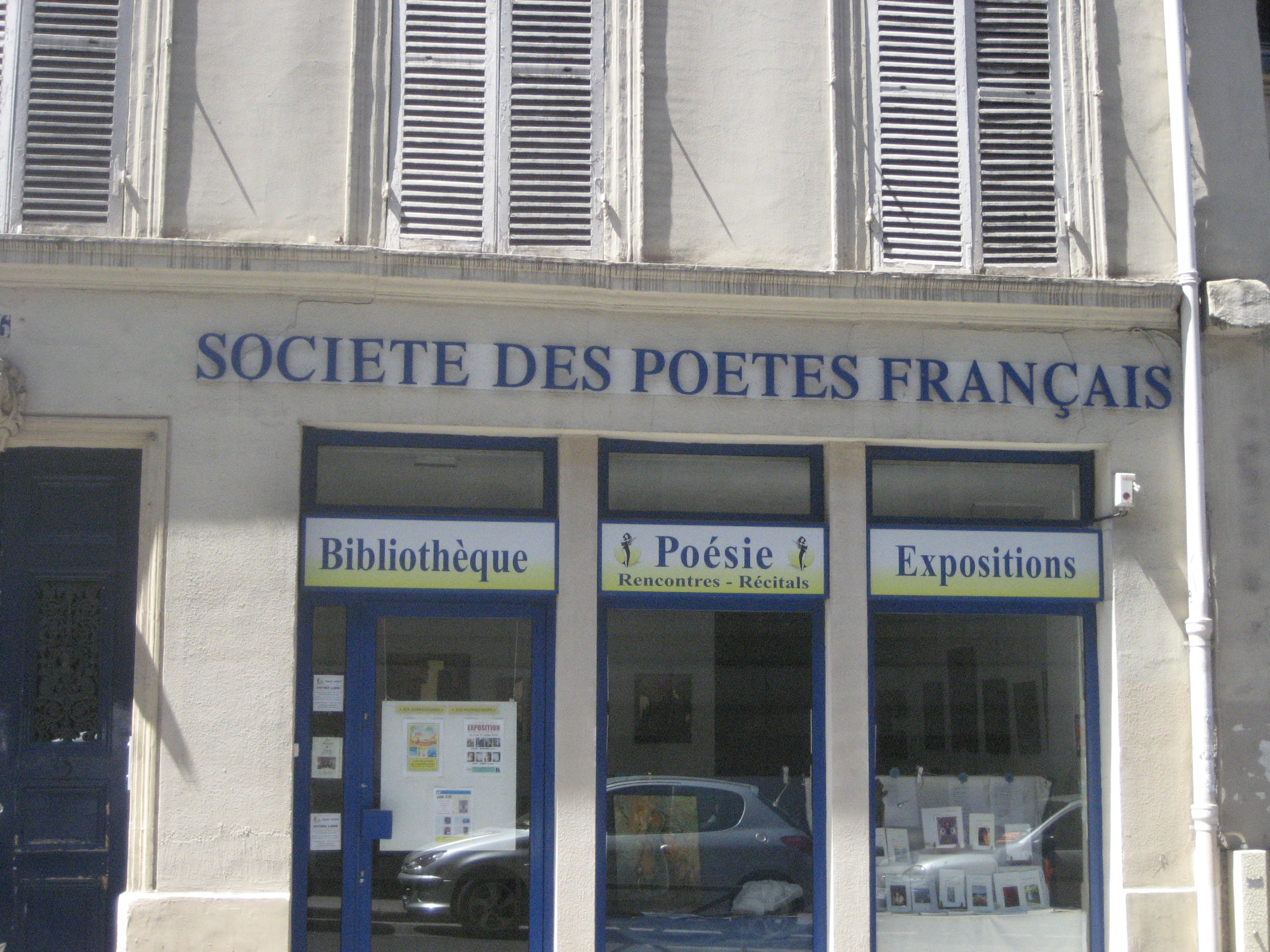
Société des poètes français, rue Monsieur-le-Prince (Paris)

The Société des poètes français (French: [sɔsjete dɛ pɔɛt fʁɑ̃sɛ], "Society of French Poets"), or SPF, was founded in 1902 by José-Maria de Heredia, Sully Prudhomme, and Leon Dierx, on the centenary of the birth of Victor Hugo. The first president was Auguste Dorchain. It is the oldest poetry society in France.

In 1986, it merged with the Sociétés des Amis de Victor Hugo, des Amis de Paul Verlaine, and des Amis de Pierre Corneille. In 1998 it began publishing the work of contemporary poets, and in 2002 opened a bookshop-gallery at L'Espace Mompezat, 16 rue Monsieur-le-Prince, Paris. It was formally recognised as a public utility by a decree of 23 October 2003. The current president is Vital Heurtebise.

It publishes the quarterly magazine Agora, and adjudicates many poetry prizes.

== Famous members ==
Edmond Haraucourt, Tristan Klingsor, Marie Noël, André Chamson, Georges Duhamel, Pierre Menanteau, Louis Aragon, Henri Bataille, Pierre Benoît, Tristan Bernard, Francis Carco, Maurice Carême, Jean Cocteau, François Coppée, Blaise Cendrars, Pierre Louÿs, Georges Courteline, Daniel-Rops, Tristan Derème, Roland Dorgelès, Paul Fort, Maurice Fombeure, Bernard Grasset, Jules Laforgue, François Mauriac, André Maurois, Amélie Murat, Anna de Noailles, Marcel Pagnol, Jean Richepin, Edmond Rostand, Maurice Rostand, Rosemonde Gérard, Antoine de Saint-Exupéry, Saint-John Perse, Cécile Sauvage, Paul Valéry, Émile Verhaeren, Marguerite Yourcenar, Pascal Bonetti, André Berry, Philippe Chabaneix, Jean-Louis Vallas, Claude Roy, Serge Brindeau, Edmond Humeau, Léopold Sédar Senghor, Pierre Béarn, Jean-Claude Renard, Alexandre Domjan, Jacques Charpentreau, Georges-Emmanuel Clancier, Yves La Prairie, Robert Sabatier, Jean Aubert.
