= Rue Monsieur-le-Prince =

Street of Paris, France, located in the 6th arrondissement

Coordinates: 48°51′01″N 2°20′23″E

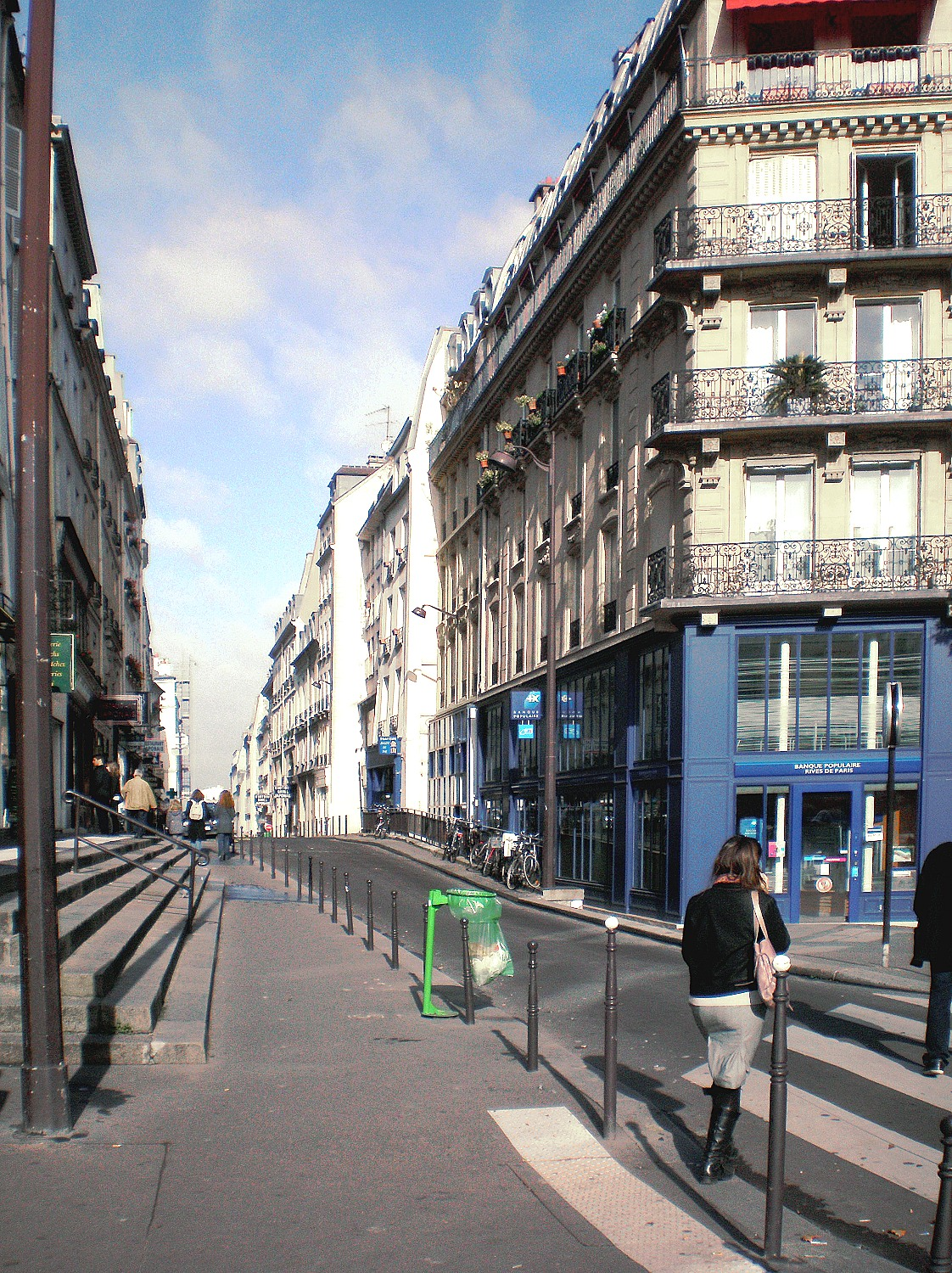
Rue Monsieur-le-Prince

The Rue Monsieur-le-Prince (French pronunciation: [ʁy məsjø lə pʁɛ̃s]) is a street of Paris, located in the 6th arrondissement. It is named after the Prince of Condé, whose palace it bordered. From 1793 to 1805, the street was called the Rue de la Liberté.

The street features in the title of the weird tale No. 252 Rue M. le Prince by the US architect Ralph Adams Cram.

== See also ==
- Hôtel de Condé, formerly in the area, the Paris residence and estate of the princes of Condé from 1612 to 1770
- Maison d'Auguste Comte, a museum located at no. 10
- Polidor, a restaurant at no. 41
- Société des poètes français, a cultural foundation at no. 16
- Wall of Philip II Augustus, traces of which are visible in this street
- Wilbur Winfield Woodward, the american painter lived and had a studio at no. 22
