= Compagnons du Devoir =

French organization of craftsmen and artisans

The Compagnons du Devoir (French pronunciation: [kɔ̃paɲɔ̃ dy dəvwaʁ]), full name Compagnons du Devoir et du Tour de France ([kɔ̃paɲɔ̃ dy dəvwaʁ e dy tuʁ də fʁɑ̃s]), is a French organization of craftsmen and artisans dating from the Middle Ages. Their traditional, technical education includes taking a tour, the Tour de France, around France and doing apprenticeships with masters. For a young man or young woman today, the Compagnonnage is a traditional mentoring network through which to learn a trade while developing character by experiencing community life and traveling. The community lives in a Compagnon house known as a cayenne and managed by a mère (mother) or maîtresse (mistress), a woman who looks after the well-being of the residents, of which there are more than 80 in France. The houses vary in size from a small house for five people to a larger one with more than 100 people living together.

Until 2005, the compagnons were all male. Today, they can be found in 49 countries across five continents, practising many different trades.

A similar tradition exists for German Wandergesellen, or Wandering journeymen.

"Tour de France" simply refers to the fact that the Compagnons travel throughout France; every six months to a year they are required to change work locations. This is unrelated to the Tour de France cycling competition. The word compagnon (companion) is derived from the Old French compaignon, a person with whom one breaks bread.

== Stages ==
The prerequisite to start a Tour de France is possession of a Certificat d'aptitude professionelle (certificate of professional aptitude). Consisting of classes and an apprenticeship, it is the basic French trade qualification.

A first-year aspiring compagnon, known as a stagiaire (apprentice), works full-time in the trade on weekdays and lives in the compagnon house. Dinner is eaten together at the siège (seat or lodge) of compagnons. Those who want to become compagnons apply for the adoption ceremony.

Next the stagiaire undertakes a travail d'adoption, a project that must be submitted to become an aspirant (aspiring/one who aspires). The aspirant is then given a name according to their region or town of origin; for example, someone from Burgundy might be called "Bourguignon". The aspirant receives a sash and a ceremonial walking staff representing the itinerant nature of the organisation. The ceremony is private, and includes only compagnons and aspirants.

An aspirant works full-time on weekdays and stays in the compagnon house. Dinner is eaten together at the house. The aspirant stays or tours in several towns over the next three to five years, working under compagnons, to learn the trade.

Eventually, the aspirant presents a masterpiece (travail de réception or chef-d'œuvre) to the board of compagnons. Masterpieces vary according to the aspirant's trade. If accepted, one may become a compagnon itinérant, receive a compagnon name and be presented with a new walking stick that reaches the height of the heart. Some of the masterpieces are displayed at the Musées du Compagnonnage in Tours and Paris.

The compagnon itinérant then does three more years of touring. They then becomes a compagnon sédentaire and can choose where to live and work, and will then begin to teach the trade to apprentices.

== Daily life ==
A typical weekday for a charpentier (carpenter) would involve a day on-site working full-time for the company that employs the aspirant. Dinner is usually held between 7:00 and 8:00 with the community living in the house. There are then classes until 10 pm in technical drawing, technology, French, English, mathematics, etc. On Saturdays, classes are from 8 am-12 pm and 1:30 pm–5:30 pm. The carpenters acquire skills through working on different projects and lessons. They create many maquettes; these wooden models of a planned project are conceived first through drawings, then assembled in wood. A carpenter will make many during the aspirant phase. Each piece is expected to demonstrate the progress made in mastering a given skill or lesson. Sundays are spent in exploring the conception of a masterpiece.

The initiation process has been described as a rite of passage, as defined by Arnold Van Gennep. It illustrates his theory in the early 20th century of the rite of passage, with its successive stages of isolation, marginality, and aggregation into the social body.

== History ==
The organization dates to medieval times, when the Compagnons built the churches and castles of France, and were persecuted by kings and the Catholic Church because they refused to live under the rules of either institution.

As a craftsman's guild, the Compagnonnage was banned by the National Assembly under the Le Chapelier Law of 1791, which was repealed in 1864.

During the German occupation of France during World War II, the Compagnons were persecuted by the Nazi occupiers, who thought they were related to the Freemasons.

== Professions ==
- stonecutter
- mason
- carpenter
- roofer
- plumber-heating engineer
- locksmith-metalsmith
- joiner
- plasterer-patternmaker-fibrous plasterer
- painter
- upholsterer
- cabinetmaker
- gardener-landscape architect
- cooper
- body repairman
- boiler maker
- mechanic constructor
- electrician
- precision mechanic
- blacksmith
- farrier
- cobbler
- leather goods maker
- harness maker
- winemaker
- baker
- pastry chef

== Notable Compagnons ==
- Agricol Perdiguier, Avignonnais la Vertu (1805–1875), joiner.
- Adolphe Clément-Bayard, c. 1871, blacksmith
- Edmond Le Martin, blacksmith/farrier who hosted many travellers in Dunes. Father of aviator Léon Lemartin.
- Joël Robuchon, who became the official chef of Compagnon du Tour de France, enabling him to travel throughout the country to learn a variety of diverse regional techniques. As a companion, he also became inculcated with the spirit of reaching moral, manual and physical perfection.
- Eugène Milon, "Guépin le soutien de Salomon" (1859–1917) carpenter, Compagnon Charpentier Du Devoir De Liberté, was a close collaborator of Gustave Eiffel. He was site foreman of the Eiffel Tower.

== In literature ==
The novel Le Compagnon du Tour de France was written by George Sand in 1840.

The book Études sur la Franc-Maçonnerie et le Compagnonnage (Studies in Freemasonry and the Compagnonnage) by René Guénon was published in 1964.

== See also ==
- Musée - Librairie du Compagnonnage
