= Robert Francon =

French philatelist

Robert Francon is a French philatelist who in 1995 was invited to sign the Roll of Distinguished Philatelists. Francon is a specialist in 20th century French stamps and has won gold medals in 1993 at Rio de Janeiro and Bangkok for his displays.

Francon was the founding president of the Académie Européenne de Philatélie who award a prize named in his honour.
