= 6th arrondissement of Paris =

Municipal arrondissement in Île-de-France, France

- Municipal arrondissement
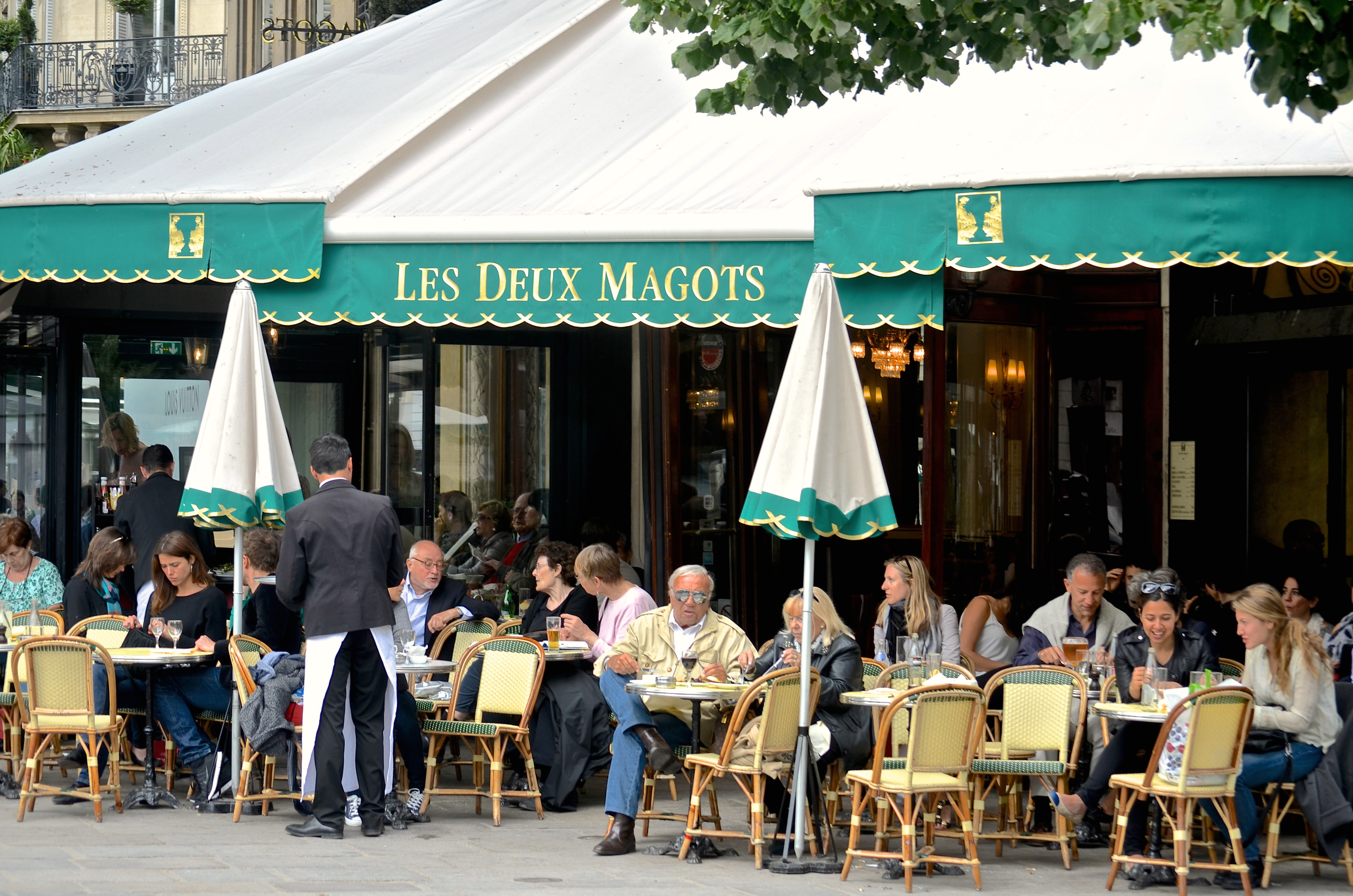
- Terrace of café Les Deux Magots, opened in 1885 on Boulevard Saint-Germain

- Coat of arms

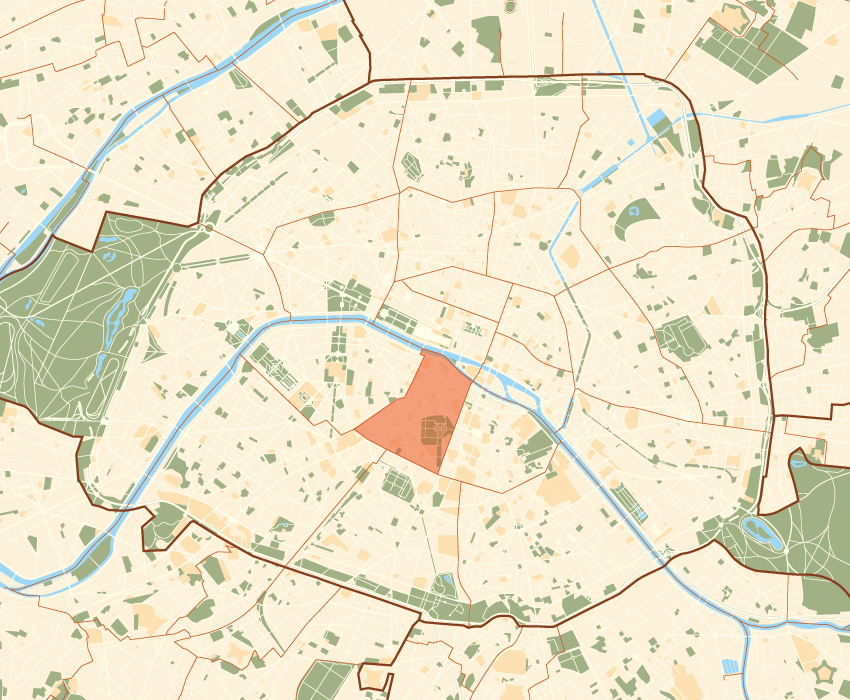
- Location within Paris
- Coordinates: 48°51′2″N 2°19′56″E
- Country: France
- Region: Île-de-France
- Department: Paris
- Commune: Paris

Government
  - Mayor (2020–2026): Jean-Pierre Lecoq (LR)
- Area: 2.154 km^{2} (0.832 sq mi)
- Population (2023): 40,389
  - Density: 18,750/km^{2} (48,560/sq mi)
- INSEE code: 75106

The 6th arrondissement of Paris (VI^{e} arrondissement) is one of the 20 arrondissements of the capital city of France. In spoken French, it is referred to as le sixième (pronounced [lə sizjɛm]). In 2023, it had a population of 40,389.

The arrondissement, called Luxembourg in a reference to the seat of the Senate and its garden, is situated on the Rive Gauche of the River Seine. It includes educational institutions such as the École nationale supérieure des Beaux-Arts, the École des hautes études en sciences sociales and the Institut de France, as well as Parisian monuments such as the Odéon-Théâtre de l'Europe, the Pont des Arts, which links the 1st and 6th arrondissements over the Seine, Saint-Germain Abbey and Saint-Sulpice Church.

This central arrondissement, which includes the historic districts of Saint-Germain-des-Prés (surrounding the abbey founded in the 6th century) and Luxembourg (surrounding the Palace and its Gardens), has played a major role throughout Parisian history. It is well known for its café culture and the revolutionary existentialism intellectualism of the authors that lived there, including Jean-Paul Sartre, Simone de Beauvoir, Gertrude Stein, Paul Éluard, Boris Vian, Albert Camus and Françoise Sagan.

With its cityscape, intellectual tradition, history, architecture and central location, the arrondissement has long been home to French intelligentsia. It is a major locale for art galleries and fashion stores and is one of Paris's most expensive areas and one of France's richest districts in terms of average income. It is part of what is called Paris Ouest (Paris West) alongside the 7th, 8th and 16th arrondissements, as well as the Neuilly-sur-Seine inner suburb.

== History ==
The current 6th arrondissement, dominated by the Abbey of Saint-Germain-des-Prés—founded in the 6th century—was the heart of the Catholic Church's power in Paris for centuries, hosting many religious institutions.

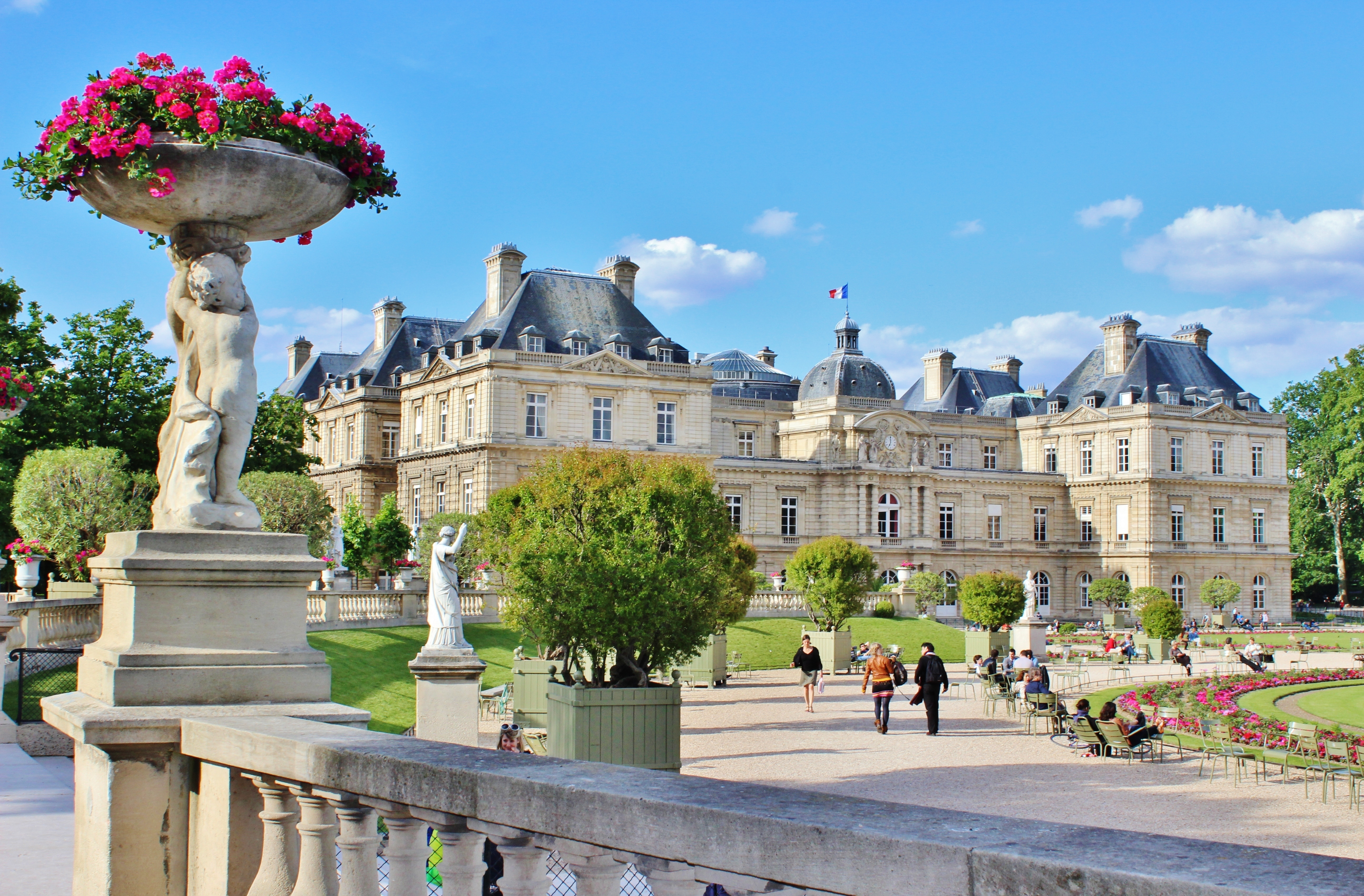
The Luxembourg Palace on the Rue de Vaugirard houses the Senate.

In 1612, Queen Marie de Médicis bought an estate in the district and commissioned architect Salomon de Brosse to transform it into the outstanding Luxembourg Palace surrounded by extensive royal gardens. The new Luxembourg Palace turned the neighbourhood into a fashionable district for French nobility.

In the aftermath of the French Revolution, architect Jean-François Chalgrin was commissioned to redesign the Luxembourg Palace in 1800 to make it the seat of the newly established Sénat conservateur. Nowadays, the grounds around the Luxembourg Palace, known as the Senate Garden (Jardin du Sénat), are open to the public; they have become a prized Parisian garden across from the 5th arrondissement's Panthéon.

Since the 1950s, the arrondissement, with its many higher education institutions, cafés (Café de Flore, Les Deux Magots, La Palette, Café Procope) and publishing houses (Gallimard, Julliard, Grasset) has been the home of much of the major post-war intellectual and literary movements and some of most influential in history such as surrealism, existentialism and modern feminism.

== Geography ==
The land area of the arrondissement is 2.154 km^{2} (0.832 sq mi), or 532 acres).

=== Quarters ===
The quarters of the 6th arrondissement

- Quartier Monnaie (21)
- Quartier Odéon (22)
- Quartier Notre-Dame-des-Champs (23)
- Quartier Saint-Germain-des-Prés (24)

=== Places of interest ===
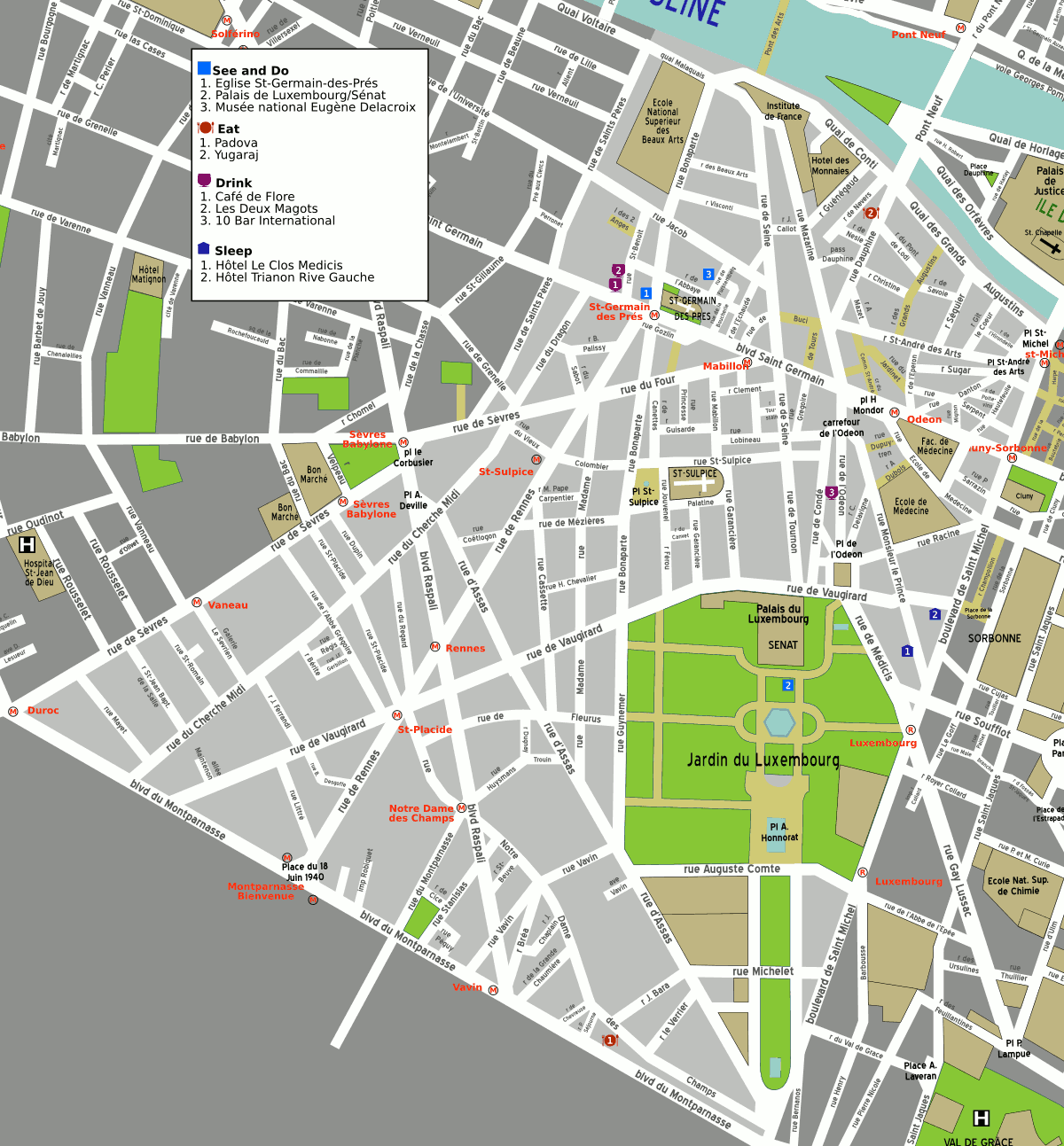
Map of the 6th arrondissement

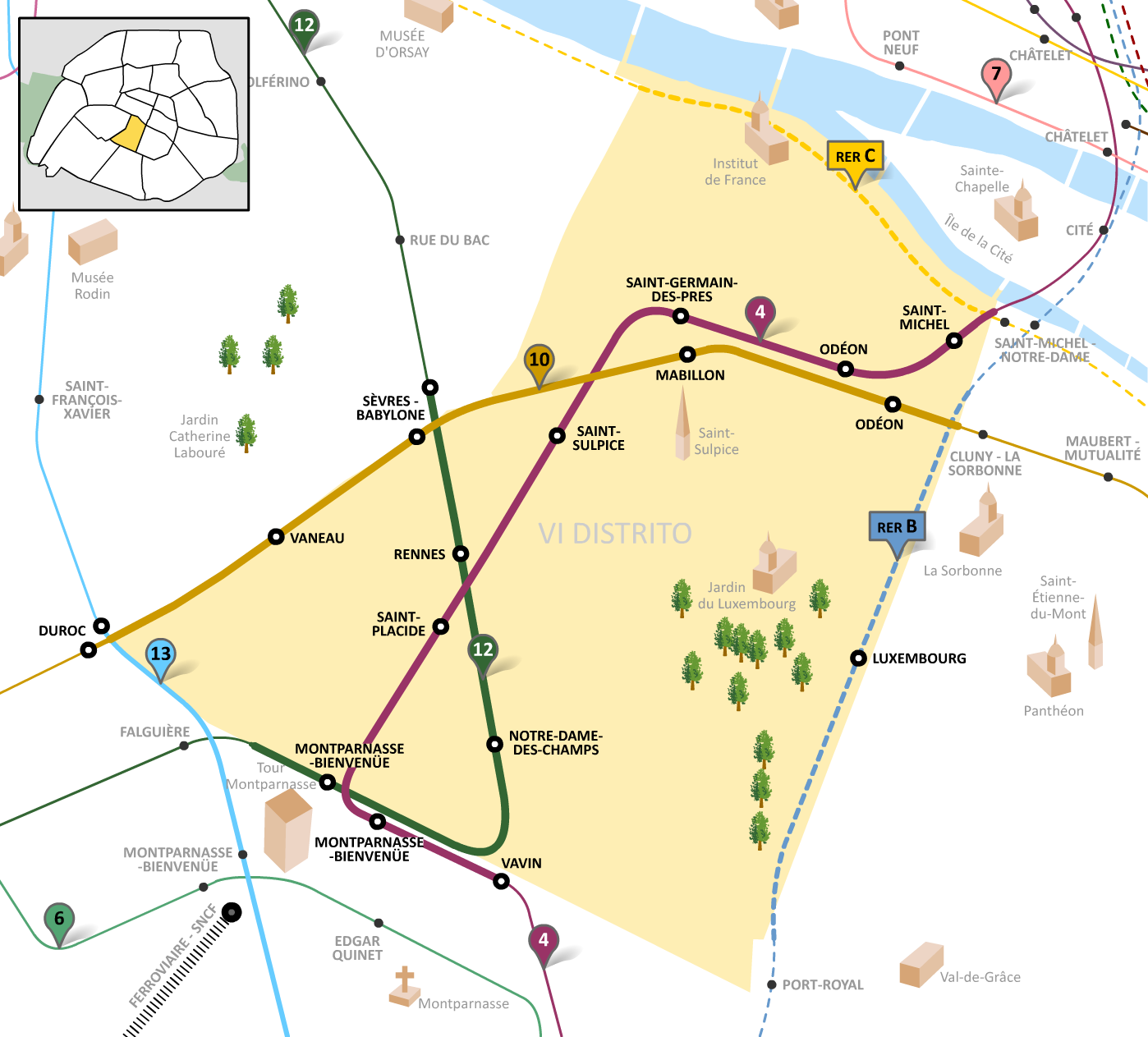
Métro map of the 6th arrondissement

- Académie Française
- Café de Flore
- Café Procope
- Hôtel de Chimay
- Hôtel Lutetia
- Institut de France
- Jardin du Luxembourg
- Latin Quarter (partial)
- Les Deux Magots
- Medici Fountain
- Notre-Dame-des-Champs, Paris
- Odéon-Théâtre de l'Europe
- Polidor
- Pont des Arts
- Pont Neuf
- Pont Saint-Michel
- Saint-Germain-des-Prés (church)
- Saint-Germain-des-Prés (quarter)
- Saint-Sulpice church
- Senate (Luxembourg Palace)
- Théâtre du Vieux-Colombier

=== Museums ===
- Fondation Jean Dubuffet
- Maison d'Auguste Comte
- Monnaie de Paris
- Musée – Librairie du Compagnonnage
- Musée d'Anatomie Delmas-Orfila-Rouvière
- Musée de Minéralogie
- Musée Edouard Branly
- Musée Hébert
- Musée Zadkine

=== Colleges and universities ===
- Paris Cité University (Saints-Pères campus)
- Pantheon-Assas University (main campus)
- Catholic University of Paris (main campus)
- St. John's University (New York City) (Paris campus)
- Lycée Stanislas
- École des hautes études en sciences sociales
- École nationale des ponts et chaussées
- École nationale supérieure des Beaux-Arts (PSL University)
- École nationale supérieure des mines de Paris (PSL University)
- Lycée Fénelon
- Lycée Montaigne
- Lycée Saint-Louis

=== Churches and chapels ===
- Saint-Joseph-des-Carmes
- Saint-Germain-des-Prés (abbey)
- Saint-Sulpice church
- Saint Vincent de Paul Chapel

=== Landmarks ===
- Arcade du Pont-Neuf
- Cherche-Midi prison
- Couvent des Cordeliers
- Comédie-Française
- Hôtel de Bourbon-Condé
- Hôtel de Condé

=== Main streets and squares ===
- Place du 18-Juin-1940
- Rue de l'Abbaye
- Rue de l'Ancienne Comédie
- Rue André-Mazet
- Rue d'Assas
- Rue Auguste Comte
- Rue de Beaux Arts
- Rue Bonaparte
  - named after Napoleon
- Rue Bréa
  - named after General Jean Baptiste Fidèle Bréa (1790–1848)
- Rue de Buci
  - named after Simon de Buci, President of the Parlement of Paris, who had purchased the Gate Saint-Germain (now demolished) in 1350
- Rue des Canettes
- Rue Cassette
- Rue du Cherche-Midi
- Rue Christine
  - named after Christine of France, Duchess of Savoy (1606–1663)
- Rue de Condé
  - named after the former Hôtel de Condé, of which forecourt faced the street
- Quai de Conti
- Rue Danton
- Passage Dauphine
- Rue Dauphine
  - named after King Louis XIII (1601–1643), Dauphin of France from 1601 to 1610
- Rue du Dragon
- Rue Duguay-Trouin
- Rue Dupin
- Rue de l'École de Médecine
- Rue de Fleurus
- Rue du Four
- Place de Furstemberg
- Rue de Furstemberg
- Rue Garancière
- Quai des Grands-Augustins
- Rue des Grands Augustins
- Rue Grégoire de Tours
  - named after Saint Gregory of Tours, Bishop of Tours (538–594)
- Rue Guisarde
- Rue Guynemer
- Rue Hautefeuille
- Place Henri Mondor
- Rue Jacques Callot
  - named after Jacques Callot (1592–1635), engraver
- Rue du Jardinet
- Rue Jacob
- Rue Lobineau
- Rue Mabillon
- Rue Madame
  - named after Marie Joséphine of Savoy (1753–1810), styled Madame
- Quai Malaquais
- Rue Mayet
- Rue Mazarine
- Rue de Médicis
- Rue de Mézières
- Rue Mignon
- Rue Monsieur-le-Prince
- Boulevard du Montparnasse
- Rue de Nesle
- Rue de Nevers
- Rue Notre-Dame des Champs
- Carrefour de l'Odéon
- Rue de l'Odéon
- Rue Palatine
  - named after Anne Henriette of Bavaria, Princess Palatine (1648–1723)
- Rue Pierre Sarrazin
- Rue des Poitevins
- Rue du Pont de Lodi
  - named after Bonaparte's victory on May 10, 1796, at the Battle of Lodi
- Rue Princesse
  - named after Catherine de Lorraine, Princess de Dombes (1552–1596)
- Rue des Quatre Vents
- Place du Québec
- Boulevard Raspail
  - named after François Vincent Raspail (1794–1878) French chemist and politician
- Rue de Rennes
- Rue Saint-André-des-Arts
- Rue Saint-Benoît
- Boulevard Saint-Germain (partial)
- Rue Saint-Jean-Baptiste de la Salle
- Boulevard Saint-Michel (partial)
- Place Saint-Michel (partial)
- Place Saint-Sulpice
- Rue Saint-Sulpice
- Rue des Saints Pères
- Rue de Savoie
- Rue de Seine
- Rue de Sèvres
- Rue Stanislas
  - named after the nearby collège Stanislas, founded under Louis XVIII, and named after one of his first names
- Rue de Tournon
  - named after Cardinal François de Tournon (1489–1562)
- Rue de Vaugirard (partial)
- Rue Vavin
  - named after the 19th-century politician Alexis Vavin
- Rue Visconti
  - named after Louis Visconti (1791–1853), designer of Napoleon's tomb

=== Gallery ===
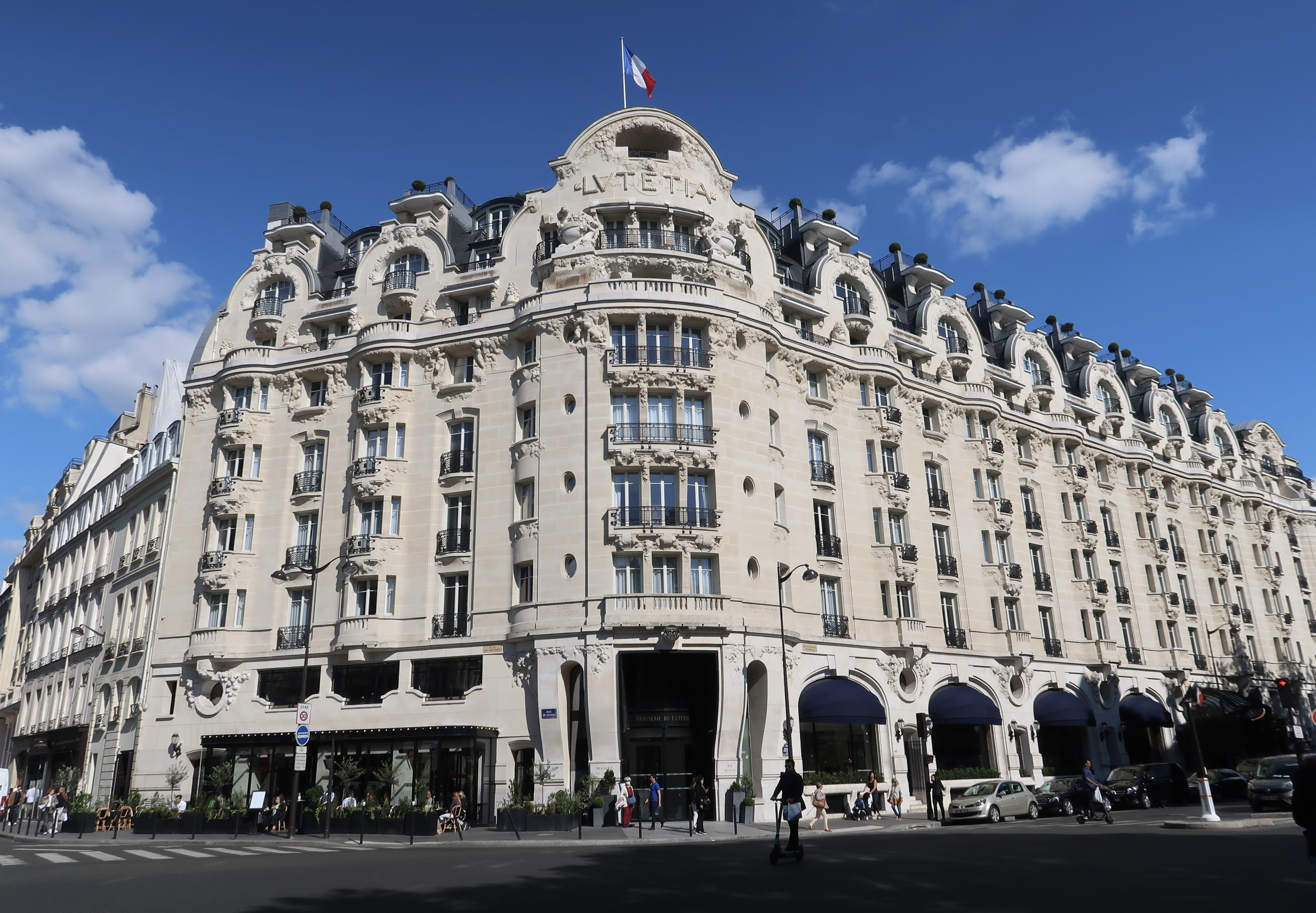
Palace Hôtel Lutetia

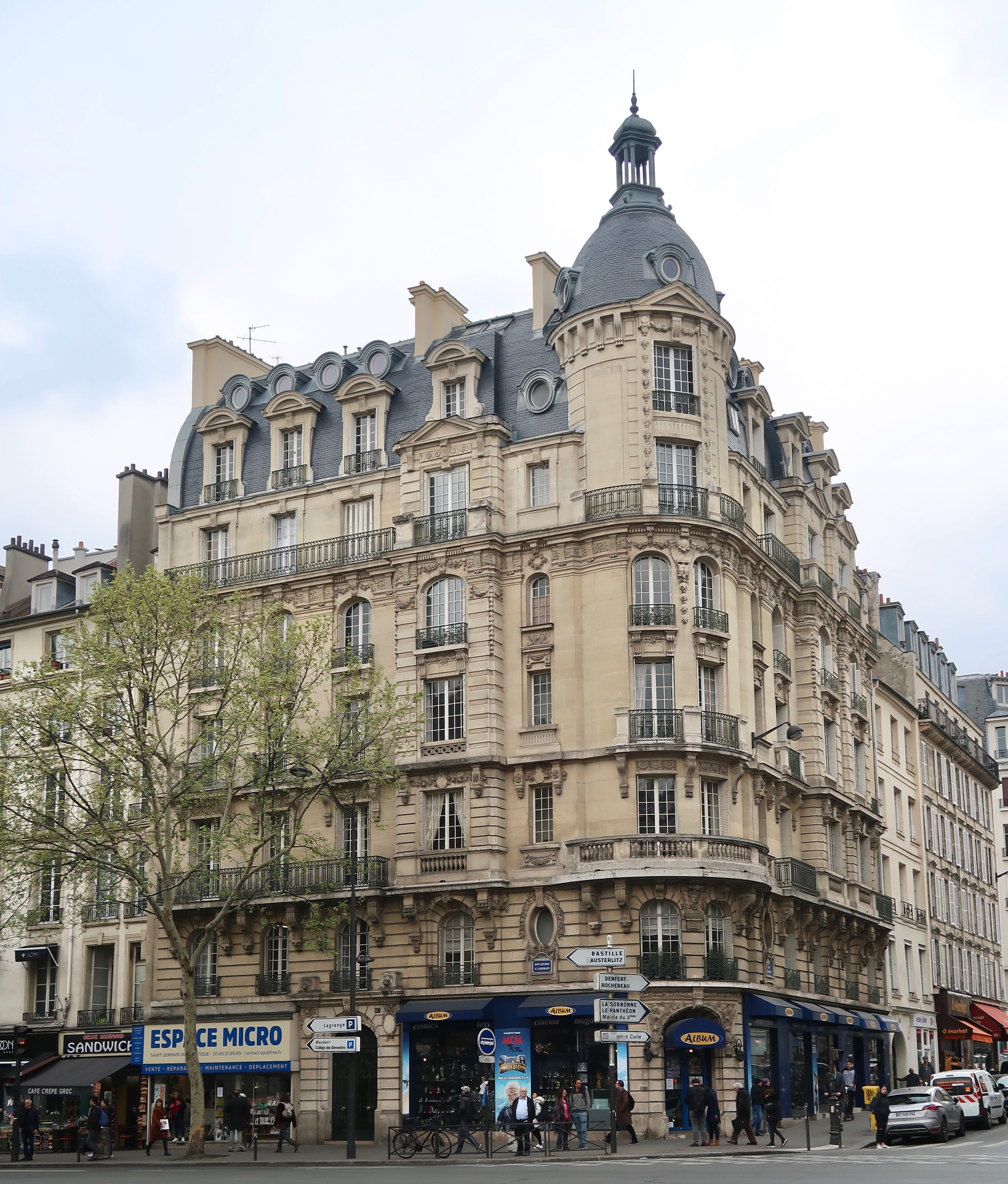
Corner between Boulevard Saint-Germain and Rue Saint-Jacques

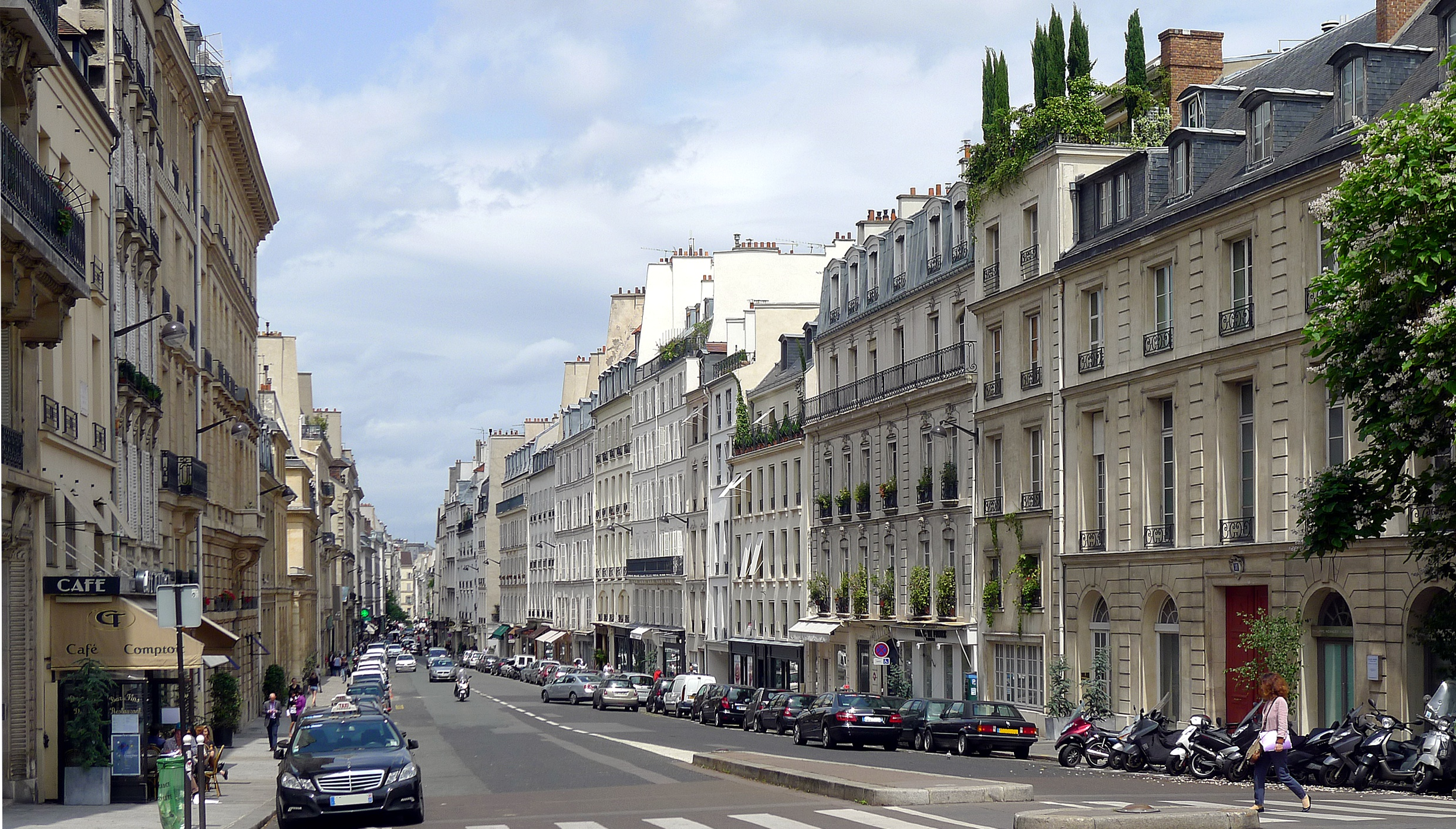
Rue Tournon

== Economy ==
Toei Animation Europe has its head office in the arrondissement. The company, which opened in 2004, serves France, Germany, Italy, Spain, and the United Kingdom.

The 6th and 7th arrondissements are the most expensive districts of Paris, the most expensive parts of the 6th arrondissement being Saint-Germain-des-Prés quarter, the riverside districts and the areas nearby the Luxembourg Garden.

== Demography ==
The arrondissement attained its peak population in 1911 when the population density reached nearly 50,000 inhabitants per km^{2}. In 2009, the arrondissement provided 43,691 jobs.

=== Historical population ===
Historical population

Year	Pop.	±% p.a.
1861	95,931	—
1872	90,288	−0.55%
1881	98,970	+1.03%
1891	100,143	+0.12%
1901	102,782	+0.26%
1911	102,993	+0.02%
1921	101,584	−0.14%
1931	100,046	−0.15%
1936	89,506	−2.20%
1946	83,963	−0.64%
1954	88,200	+0.62%

Year	Pop.	±% p.a.
1962	80,262	−1.17%
1968	70,891	−2.05%
1975	56,331	−3.23%
1982	48,905	−2.00%
1990	47,891	−0.26%
1999	44,919	−0.71%
2007	45,332	+0.11%
2012	43,224	−0.95%
2017	41,100	−1.00%
2023	40,389	−0.29%

Source: Demographia (1861-1999) and INSEE (1876-2023)

=== Immigration ===
Place of birth of residents of the 6th arrondissement in 1999
Born in metropolitan France	Born outside metropolitan France			
79.6%	20.4%			
79.6%	Born in overseas France	Born in foreign countries with French citizenship at birth^{1}	EU-15 immigrants^{2}	Non-EU-15 immigrants
79.6%	0.6%	5.0%	6.1%	8.7%
^{1} This group is made up largely of former French settlers, such as pieds-noirs in Northwest Africa, followed by former colonial citizens who had French citizenship at birth (such as was often the case for the native elite in French colonies), as well as to a lesser extent foreign-born children of French expatriates. A foreign country is understood as a country not part of France in 1999, so a person born for example in 1950 in Algeria, when Algeria was an integral part of France, is nonetheless listed as a person born in a foreign country in French statistics.^{2} An immigrant is a person born in a foreign country not having French citizenship at birth. An immigrant may have acquired French citizenship since moving to France, but is still considered an immigrant in French statistics. On the other hand, persons born in France with foreign citizenship (the children of immigrants) are not listed as immigrants.

== Notable people ==
- Raymond Aron (1905–1983), historian and philosopher
- Heinz Berggruen (1914–2007), art collector
- Catherine Deneuve (b. 1943), actress
- Maurice Françon (1913–1996), engineer and physicist
- Ina Garten (b. 1948), American chef and author
