= Maurice Françon =

French engineer and physicist (1913–1996)

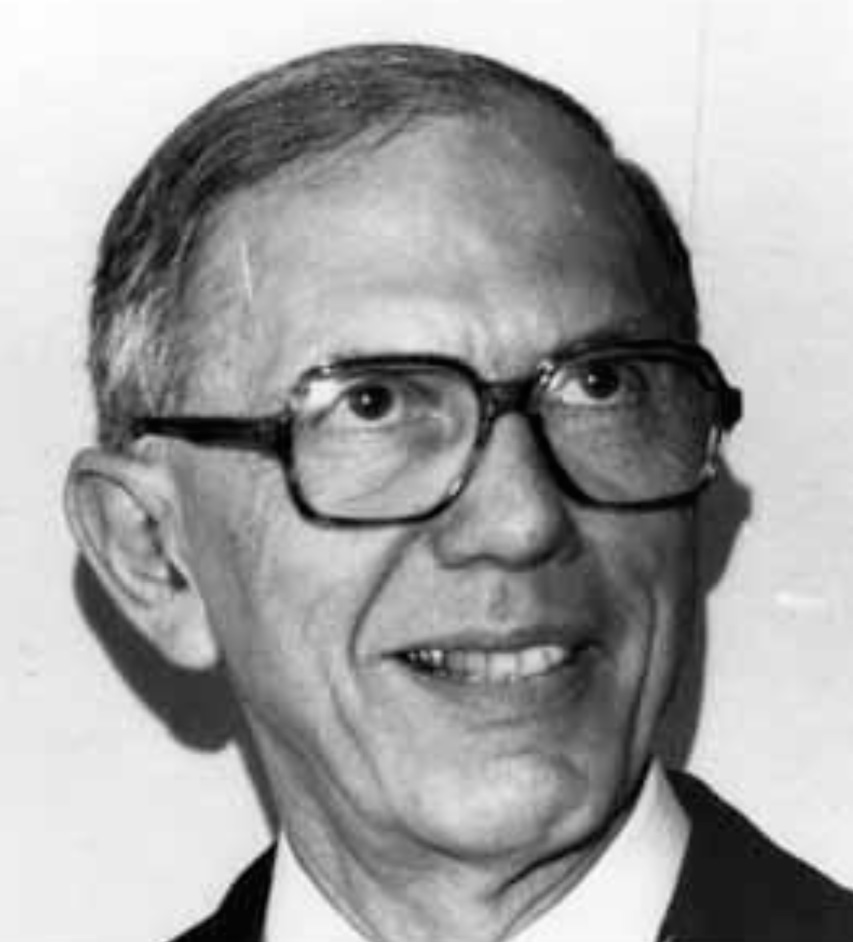
- Françon in 1981
- Born: 15 June 1913
- Died: 11 August 1996 (aged 83)
- Education: Faculté des Sciences de Paris
- Known for: Engineer, physicist
- Scientific career
- Thesis: Vision dans un instrument entaché d'aberration sphérique
- Doctoral advisor: Pierre Fleury

Maurice Françon (15 June 1913 – 11 August 1996) was a French engineer, physicist and academic.

== Early life ==
Françon was born on rue de Littré in the 6th arrondissement of Paris on 15 June 1913. His father was related to the Edouard Herriot's family and worked as a chemical engineer at the Physical Research Laboratory of the Sorbonne managed by Gabriel Lippmann.

Françon graduated with a licence ès sciences physiques from the Faculté des Sciences de Paris. In 1938, he entered SupOptique as an engineer. During World War II, he was sent to Dunkerque in the North of France and escaped to England on a civilian ship on June 2nd, 1940.

== Career ==
His graduate studies were mainly related to physiological optics. Françon was employed by the SupOptique's Laboratory at Saint-Cyr-sur-Mer. After the Nazi invasion in the Zone libre, Françon returned to Paris on Boulevard Pasteur and began to write his thesis titled Vision in an instrument tainted with spherical aberration (in French: Vision dans un instrument entaché d'aberration sphérique) under the supervision of Pierre Fleury. that he submit in 1945 at the Sorbonne before a jury chaired by Charles Fabry. He became head of the Science faculty and in charge of practical work at the Institut d'optique Graduate School with André Maréchal.

== Burial ==
Maurice Françon is buried in Montparnasse Cemetery in Paris.
