= Louis-Nicolas Robert =

French soldier and mechanical engineer (1761–1828)

Nicolas Louis Robert
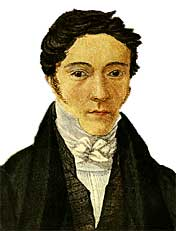
- Nicolas Louis Robert painted by his sister
- Born: 2 December 1761; Église Saint-Eustache, Paris
- Died: 8 August 1828 (aged 66); Vernouillet, Eure-et-Loir
- Occupations: Soldier, mechanical engineer, clerk, teacher
- Known for: 1799 patent for manufacture of continuous paper

Nicolas Louis Robert (2 December 1761 – 8 August 1828) was a French soldier and mechanical engineer, who is credited with a paper-making invention that became the blueprint of the Fourdrinier machine.

In 1799, Robert patented the first machine to produce 'continuous paper'. After a series of legal and financial quarrels with Saint-Léger Didot, Robert lost control of his patent. The machine was then shipped out of post-revolutionary France and further developed in England. Robert's invention became the core of the Fourdrinier machine, the basis for modern papermaking. He eventually became a school-teacher and died in penury.

== Early and family life ==
Louis-Nicolas Robert was born to aging parents on rue Neuve-Saint-Eustache, 1st arrondissement of Paris. As a child he was physically frail and self-conscious, but studious and ambitious. He received an excellent education with a strong focus on science and mathematics at the hands of the religious order of the Minimes. He felt guilty for being a financial burden to his parents. At the age of 15, he tried to enlist in the army in order to support the American Revolution, but was rejected. He was accepted into the military four years later.

On 23 April 1780 he joined the First Battalion of the Grenoble Artillery, and was subsequently stationed in Calais. In 1781 he transferred to the Metz Artillery regiment and was sent to Saint-Domingue, where he fought the English. He served in the military for 14 years (circa 1794), and rose to the rank of sergeant major. Another account of Robert's military career suggests that he left the army aged 28, in 1790.

Robert married Charlotte Routier on 11 November 1794, in a civil ceremony. The ceremony was civil because of the post-Revolutionary decree that marriage be a simple civil contract, certified by a municipal officer.

== Paper manufacture machine ==
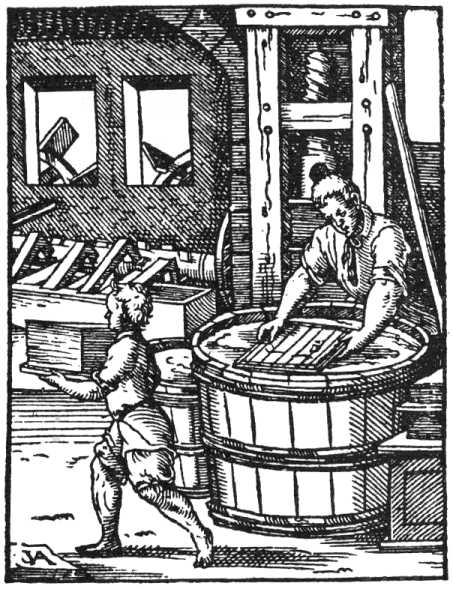
Workers making paper by hand

In 1790, having finished with his military career, Robert became an indentured clerk at one of the Didot family's renowned Paris publishing houses. First working under Saint-Léger Didot as a clerk, he later switched to a position as "inspector of personnel" at Pierre-François Didot's paper-making factory in Corbeil-Essonnes. This well-respected establishment had a history dating back to 1355 and supplied paper to the Ministry of Finance for currency manufacture. Both Robert and Didot grew impatient with the quarrelling workers, vatmen, couchers, and laymen, so Robert was spurred to look for a mechanical solution to the manual labour of the paper-making process.

In his book Papermaking: the History and Technique of an Ancient Craft, Dard Hunter reported that:

[Louis-Nicolas Robert] declared that it was the constant strife and quarrelling among the workers of the handmade papermakers' guild that drove him to the creation of the machine that would replace hand labour.

Although Didot judged Robert's first plans to be "feeble", they showed enough promise to continue research, and Didot financed a small prototype model. This was completed by 1797, but it was also deemed a failure. Robert became discouraged, so Didot appointed him "superintendent of grain grinding" at a nearby flour mill. After a few months' rest from the paper factory, Didot encouraged Robert to reprise the paper machine, and put several mechanics at his disposal. The next model showed some improvement, and Didot therefore instructed Robert to make a full-size model, scaling-up to the popular 24 inch 'Colombier' width. This machine was a success and produced two sheets of "well felted" paper.

== Patent application ==
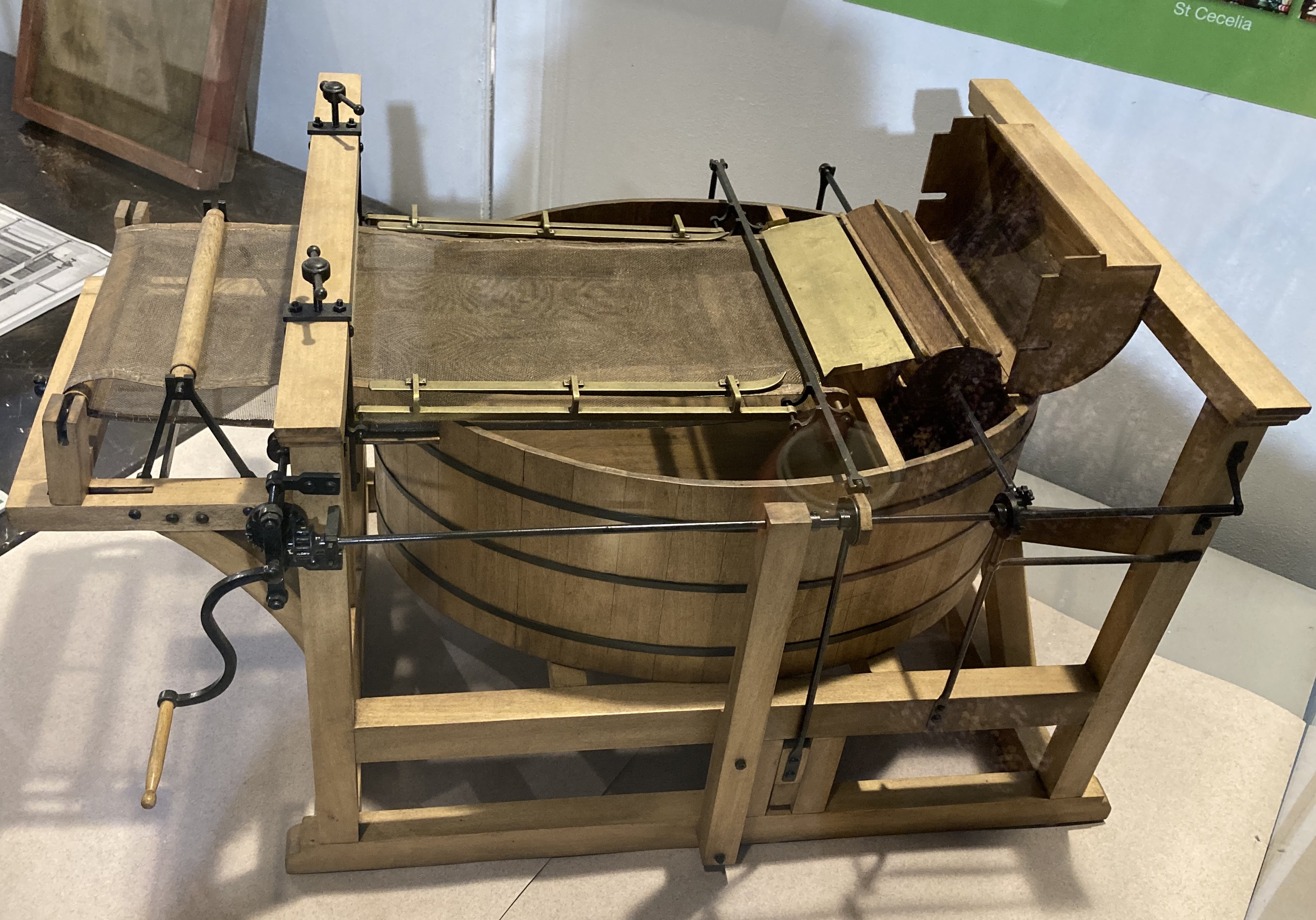
Model of Louis-Nicholas Robert's continuous paper making machine at Frogmore Paper Mill

Following Robert's successful model, built in 1798, Saint-Léger Didot insisted that Robert apply for a patent. Prior to 1798, paper was made one sheet at a time, by dipping a rectangular frame or mould with a screen bottom into a vat of pulp. The frame was removed from the vat, and the water was pressed out of the pulp. The remaining pulp was allowed to dry; the frame could not be re-used until the previous sheet of paper was removed from it. Robert's construction had a moving screen belt that would receive a continuous flow of stock and deliver an unbroken sheet of wet paper to a pair of squeeze rolls. As the continuous strip of wet paper came off the machine it was manually hung over a series of cables or bars to dry. With Didot's urging, Robert and Didot went to François de Neufchâteau, the Minister of the Interior and applied for a patent. In 1799, the patent (brevet d'invention) was granted by the French Government, for which Robert paid 8,000 francs.

The patent specification and application for the continuous paper-making machine is published in the second volume of the Brevets d'Inventions Expirés.

On 9 September 1798 (23 Fructidor Year VI) Robert wrote a letter applying for a patent:

For several years I have been employed in one of the principal mills of France. It has been my dream to simplify the operation of making paper by forming it with infinitely less expense, and, above all, in making sheets of extraordinary length without the help of any worker, using only mechanical means.

Through diligent work, by experience, and with considerable expense, I have been successful and a machine has been made that fulfils my expectancy. The machine makes for economy of time and expense and extraordinary paper, being 12 to 15 metres in length, if one wishes.

In a few words I have set forth the advantages of my machine, which I have built at the home of Citizen Didot, manufacturer at Essonnes. It is here the place to say that in Citizen Didot I have found great help in the making of this machine. His workshop, his workers, even his purse, have been at my disposition; he shares generosity and confidence that one finds only in real friends of the arts.

I solicit you, Citizen Minister, for the patent of my invention, which ought to assure me my property, and work for myself. My fortune does not permit me to pay the tax of this patent at once, which I desire to have for fifteen years, nor do my means permit me the cost of a model. This is why, Citizen Minister, I implore you to name a number of commissioners to examine my work, and in view of the immense usefulness of my discovery grant me a patent gratuitously. Robert

De Neufchâteau authorised the Bureau of Arts and Trades (Bureau des Arts et Métiers) to send a draughtsman, Monsieur Beauvelot, to Essonnes to document and build an improved model. The minister also authorised a member of the Conservatoire National des Arts et Métiers to accompany him. The Bureau des Arts et Métiers then declared:

Citizen Robert is the first to imagine a machine capable of making paper from the vat; this machine forms paper of great width and of indefinite length. The machine makes paper of perfect quality in thickness and gives advantages that cannot be derived from ordinary methods of forming paper by hand, where each sheet is limited in size in comparison with those made on this machine. From all reports it is an entirely new invention and deserves every encouragement.

The Conservatoire des Arts et Métiers paid Robert three thousand francs to build another model for permanent display at the Musée des Arts et Métiers.

In 1785, Christophe-Philippe Oberkampf invented the first machine for printing dyes on squares of wallpaper. The significance of Robert's invention was for more than mechanising a labour-intensive process, in also allowing continuous lengths of patterned and coloured paper to be produced for hanging. This offered the prospect of novel designs and nice tints to be printed and displayed in drawing rooms across Europe.

== Development in England ==
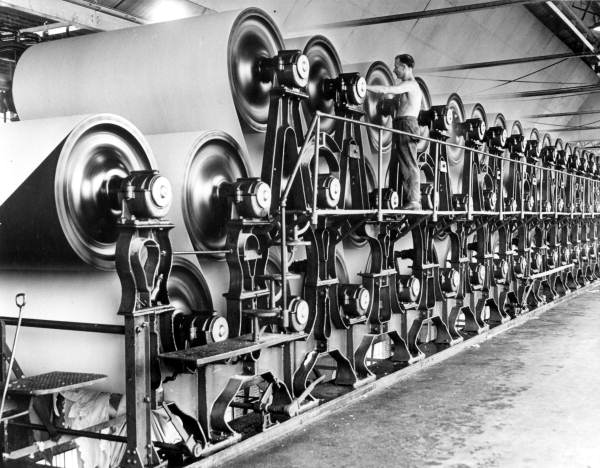
Large Fourdrinier-style paper-making machine

Robert and Didot quarrelled over the ownership of the invention. Robert eventually sold both the patent and the prototype machine to Didot for 25,000 francs. Didot defaulted on the payments to Robert, however, and he was forced to recover legal ownership of the patent on 23 June 1801. Didot wanted to develop and patent the machine in England, away from the distractions of the French Revolution, so he sent his English brother-in-law, John Gamble, to London.

In March 1801, after demonstrating continuous rolls of paper from Essonne, John Gamble agreed to share the London patent application with brothers Sealy and Henry Fourdrinier, who ran a leading stationery house. Gamble was granted British patent 2487 on 20 October 1801 for an improved version of Robert's original machine. Thus the next development was financed by the London stationers. Gamble and Didot shipped the machine to London, and after 6 years and approximately £60,000 of development costs, the Fourdriniers were awarded new patents. An example of the Fourdrinier machine was installed at Frogmore, Hertfordshire.

== Death and commemoration ==
In 1812, in poor health, having both sold and lost control of his invention and the patent, with further exploitation being concentrated in England, Robert retired from paper-making and left Corbeil-Essonnes. He moved to Vernouillet, Eure-et-Loir and opened a small school, Faubourg St Thibault. The French economy was very depressed after Napoleon's defeats, and Robert was very poorly paid. He continued teaching until his death on 8 August 1828. A statue of him stands in front of the church in Vernouillet, and the "Collège de Louis-Nicolas Robert" in the quartier des Grandes Vauvettes is named in his honour.

In 1976, Leonard Schlosser discovered Robert's original drawings at auction and made facsimiles for scholars and friends. It is not now known where the original drawings can be seen.

== See also ==
- History of paper
- Fourdrinier machine
- Papermaking
- Paper mill
- Pulp and paper industry
