= John Bathurst Deane =

English clergyman (1797–1887)

John Bathurst Deane (27 August 1797 – 12 July 1887) was a Cape Colony-born English clergyman, schoolmaster, antiquary, and author.

== Early life and education ==
Born at the Cape of Good Hope in 1797, Deane was the second son of Captain Charles Meredith Deane, of the 24th Light Dragoons. According to research undertaken by Deane and posthumously completed and published by his daughter Mary as The Book of Dene, Deane, Adeane: a genealogical history from Norman times of the families originating in Northamptonshire and the Forest of Dean, the family claimed to be descended from a Norman royal cup-bearer, Roberto de Dena. The Athenaeum looked askance at the book's scholarship, noting that it largely constituted "a series of the baldest notes, in which the descent of every prominent Dene, Deane, Denny or Adeane is set forth, and any bearer of a similar name finds a place." The Genealogist reviewer noted "... sadness on finding the author indulging in a belief that the Dennes, Adeanes, Deanes and others bearing similar surnames derive their cognomen from a common ancestor... some curious heraldic and genealogical statements and deductions put a serious criticism of her work out of the question".

Deane was educated at Merchant Taylors' School, which at that time was in the City of London, and at Pembroke College, Cambridge. On 19 July 1816 he was baptised at St Mary's Chapel, Parish of St Swithin's, Walcot, Somerset, and matriculated at Cambridge a few weeks later, graduating BA in 1820, promoted to MA in 1823.

== Career ==
He was ordained a deacon at Exeter in 1821 and a priest in 1823. From 1836 to 1855 he was a schoolmaster at his old school, rising to head of mathematics, and for part of that time was also curate of St Benet Fink and of St Michael's, Wood Street. In 1855 he was appointed as Vicar of Bishopsgate, London, and Rector of St Helen's, Bishopsgate, with which parish St Martin Outwich was combined in 1874. He kept these benefices until 1887.

== Personal life ==
On 15 June 1822 he married Caroline Lemprière, the daughter of the scholar and teacher John Lemprière, at St Nicholas's church, Shaldon, Devon. She died at the age of twenty-seven.

On 22 March 1834, Deane married secondly a Miss Louisa Elizabeth Fourdrinier, of Tottenham, and they had thirteen children, including Hugh Pollexfen Deane (1837), Henry Allen Murray Deane, Walter Meredith Deane (1841), Mary Deane, Sophia Deane, Eleanor Deane, Emmeline Deane, and Augusta Deane. His father-in-law, Sealy Fourdrinier (1773–1847) and his older brother Henry (1766–1854) had invented the paper machine, but had gone bankrupt in developing it.

Deane belonged to the Society of Antiquaries and its Council and also to the Antiquarians' Club. In 1843 he was one of the founders of the British Archaeological Association and, in 1844, of the Royal Archaeological Institute of Great Britain and Ireland. In his historical work, Deane found widespread traces of serpent worship, which he connected with the rise of polytheism, in the cultures of Persia, India, China, Mexico, Anatolia, and Phoenicia, and also in the paganism of Europe.

Deane's daughter, Eleanor, who was the tenth child in the family, became the mother of P. G. Wodehouse. Another daughter was the novelist Mary Bathurst Deane, and a third, Emmeline (died 1944), became an artist and painted her father's portrait. His son, Walter Meredith Deane (1840–1906), was a civil servant in Hong Kong.

He died at Bath, Somerset at the age of 89. His address at the time of his death was Sion Hill, Bath. He left a widow, Louisa Elizabeth Deane, and an estate valued at £10,968. After his death, his widow and four unmarried daughters moved to Ditteridge, near Box, Wiltshire, where their house became P. G. Wodehouse's home address while his parents were in Hong Kong. Deane's widow, Louisa Elizabeth, then of Cheney Court, Ditteridge, died in 1892 leaving £9,530.

== Works ==
- The Worship of the Serpent (1830)
- Observations on Dracontia (1833)
- On the Church and Chapters (1840)
- The Life of Richard Deane, Admiral and General of the Forces under Cromwell (1870)
- Roman Legions in Britain (incomplete manuscript at his death)
