= Mary Bathurst Deane =

English novelist (c.1843–1940)

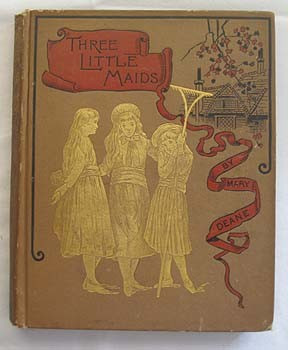
- Deane's book Three Little Maids (Boston edition of 1889)
- Born: c. 1843
- Died: 13 April 1940; Fairford

Mary Bathurst Deane (c. 1843 – 13 April 1940) was an English novelist.

== Life ==
The daughter of John Bathurst Deane, Deane was a Victorian gentlewoman of many accomplishments. She published fourteen books, mostly novels, was a good amateur artist, and never married. She was an aunt of the writer P. G. Wodehouse and in his work was the original of Bertie Wooster's fictional Aunt Agatha, the most alarming of Bertie's many aunts.

She was one of the thirteen children of her father's marriage to Louisa Elizabeth Fourdrinier, of Tottenham. Her grandfather, Sealy Fourdrinier (1773–1847) and his older brother Henry (1766–1854) had invented the paper machine, but had gone bankrupt in developing it.

Her brother Walter Meredith Deane (1840–1906) was a civil servant in Hong Kong. Her sister Eleanor (1861–1941) married Henry Ernest Wodehouse on 3 February 1877, and another sister, Emmeline (died 1944), became an artist. After their father died in 1887, their mother and her four remaining unmarried daughters moved to Cheney (or Cheyney) Court, Ditteridge, a large 17th-century house near Box in Wiltshire, which became P. G. Wodehouse's home while his parents were living in Hong Kong. His grandmother died in 1892, and he was largely brought up by his aunts, including Mary Bathurst Deane.

In a letter dated 14 January 1955, Wodehouse wrote "Aunt Agatha is definitely my Aunt Mary, who was the scourge of my childhood." According to Richard Usborne, a leading Wodehouse scholar, "His Aunt Mary (Deane) harried and harassed him a good deal, and blossomed later into Bertie's Aunt Agatha. Aunt Mary honestly considered that her harrying and harassing of the young Pelham was for his good; and she may have been right." However, Deane took great delight in society, not least in her friendship with her contemporary Lord Sherborne, who is mentioned often in her diary.

Deane died in April 1940, at The Retreat, an asylum in Fairford, Gloucestershire. She left an estate valued at £473, and probate was granted to her niece Ella Marjory Waldron.

Some of Deane's diaries and personal papers have survived, leading to the publication of a biography of her in 2016.

== Selected publications ==
- Quatrefoil, a Novel (1883)
- Three Little Maids, or, Chronicles of Acacia Garden (1888)
- Seen in an Old Mirror, a Novel (1891)
- Kinsfolk (3 volumes) (1891)
- St Briavels (two volumes)
- Mr Zinzan of Bath
- Treasure and Heart (1903)
- The Rose Spinner
- The Little Neighbour (1905)
- The Other Pawn (1907)
- Eve's Apple, a Novel
- The Book of Dene, Deane, Adeane. A genealogical history (London, E. Stock, 1899), compiled from notes collected by John Bathurst Deane
- A Book of Verse (1921)
