= Aunay-sous-Crécy =

- Commune
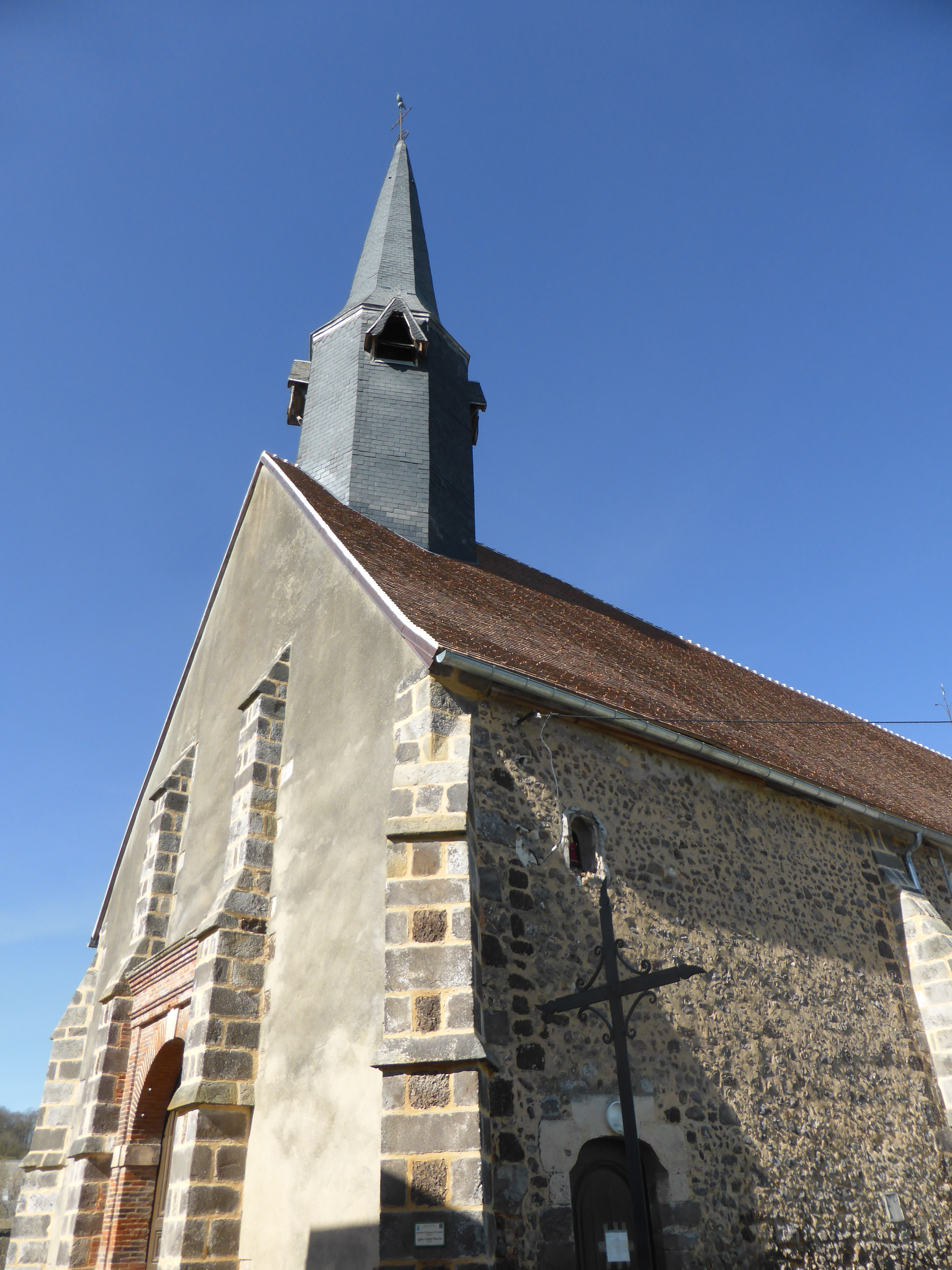
- The church in Aunay-sous-Crécy

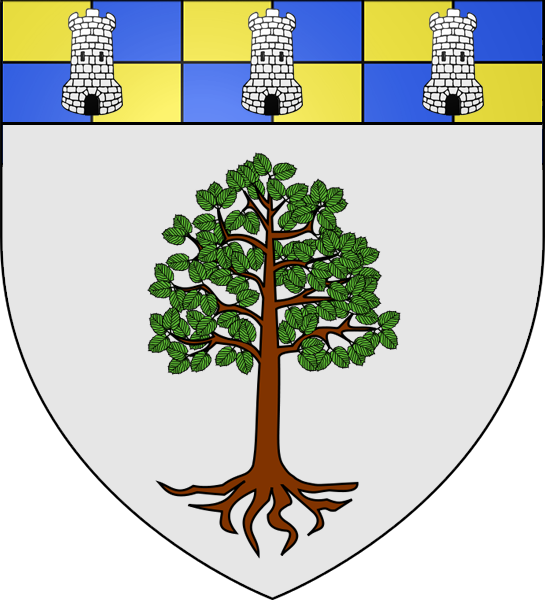
- Coat of arms
- Location of Aunay-sous-Crécy
- Location within France Location within Centre-Val de Loire
- Coordinates: 48°40′15″N 1°18′20″E
- Country: France
- Region: Centre-Val de Loire
- Department: Eure-et-Loir
- Arrondissement: Dreux
- Canton: Dreux-1
- Intercommunality: CA Pays Dreux

Government
  - Mayor (2020–2026): Jacques Rivière
- Area^{1}: 8.45 km^{2} (3.26 sq mi)
- Elevation: 110 m (360 ft)
- Highest elevation: 172 m (564 ft)
- Lowest elevation: 106 m (348 ft)
- Population (2023): 646
  - Density: 76.4/km^{2} (198/sq mi)
- Time zone: UTC+01:00 (CET)
  - Summer (DST): UTC+02:00 (CEST)
- INSEE/Postal code: 28014 /28500
- ^{1} French Land Register data, which excludes lakes, ponds, glaciers > 1 km^{2} (0.386 sq mi or 247 acres) and river estuaries.

Aunay-sous-Crécy (French pronunciation: [onɛ su kʁesi], literally Aunay under Crécy) is a commune in the Eure-et-Loir department in northern France.

== Population ==
Historical population
Year	Pop.	±% p.a.
1968	444	—
1975	566	+3.53%
1982	666	+2.35%
1990	673	+0.13%
1999	644	−0.49%
2007	569	−1.54%
2012	575	+0.21%
2017	637	+2.07%
2023	646	+0.23%
Source: INSEE

== See also ==
- Communes of the Eure-et-Loir department
