= Allainville =

Allainville is the name of the following communes in France:

- Allainville, Eure-et-Loir, in the Eure-et-Loir department
- Allainville, Yvelines, in the Yvelines department
