= Vernouillet =

Vernouillet may refer to:

- Vernouillet, Eure-et-Loir, France
- Vernouillet, Yvelines, France
- Vernouillet Airport, near Vernouillet, Eure-et-Loir
