= Paul Fourdrinier =

English engraver (1698–1758)

Paul Fourdrinier (20 December 1698 – 18 February 1758), sometimes referred to as Peter or Pierre Fourdrinier, was an 18th-century engraver in England.

== Biography ==
Paul Fourdrinier, engraver and printseller, was born on 20 December 1698 in Groningen in the Netherlands, the son of Jacques Fourdrinier and his wife, Jeanne Theroude, Huguenot refugees from Dieppe, Normandy.

He was a pupil of Bernard Picart at Amsterdam for six years, and came to England in 1720. He was employed in engraving portraits and book illustrations. He also engraved two works by Peter Monamy, marine paintings displayed in Vauxhall Gardens. The engravings were published in 1743, but may have been executed earlier. Starting in 1742 Fourdrinier produced a series of books consisting of numerous folding charts showing "The Succession of Colonels to all his Majesties Land Forces from their Rise to 1742", as well as many other details of British military and naval personnel.

== Name ==
The 2004 edition of the Oxford Dictionary of National Biography makes it clear that in the 19th century edition of the Dictionary of National Biography this engraver's works and career were assigned to two individuals, Peter (or Pierre) and Paul Fourdrinier. Peter/Pierre is now seen to be a fictitious individual resulting from an accidental misnaming of Paul.

Paul Fourdrinier is mentioned as the engraver of some of the works listed above, and he has been identified with the Paul Fourdrinier who was of the parish of St. Martin's-in-the-Fields, married to Susanna Grolleau, and who died in January or February 1758. The couple had at least five children. His grandsons, Henry and Sealy Fourdrinier, developed a synonymous papermachine, and his great-granddaughter, Jemima Fourdrinier, was the mother of Cardinal John Henry Newman. The engravings listed are in all cases inscribed "P. Fourdrinier". The title-page of Chambers's Civil Architecture says that the plates were engraved by "Old Rooker, Old Fourdrinier, and others". Paul Fourdrinier also founded a stationery business which was carried on by his son Henry and grandsons Henry and Sealy until at least 1811.

== Works ==
=== Portraits ===
He engraved portraits of:

- Cardinal Wolsey and Bishop Tonstall in Richard Fiddes's The Life of Cardinal Wolsey
- John Radcliffe, M.D., after Kneller
- William Pattison, poet, after J. Saunders
- William Conolly, speaker of the House of Commons in Ireland, after Jervas
- Jonathan Swift, after Jervas
- Dr. John Friend, after M. Dahl
- Thomas Wright, after G. Allen

=== Book illustrations ===
He engraved plates for:

- Robert Castell's ‘Villas of the Ancients’
- Sir W. Chambers's ‘Civil Architecture’
- 'Poems on Several Occasions' by John Gay, 1731
- 'Les Avantures de Telemaque ' (Londres R. Dodsley 1738) 24 Plates
- ‘The Four Ages of Man,’ after Lancret
- one of Lemprière's views of Belem, near Lisbon, before the earthquake
- Spenser's ‘Calendarium Pastorale’ (London, 1732, 8vo)
- Ware's ‘Views and Elevations of Houghton House, Norfolk’
- Wood's ‘Ruins of Palmyra’
- Louthiana: or, An introduction to the antiquities of Ireland. In upwards of ninety views and plans: representing, with proper explanations, the principal ruins, curiosities, and antient dwellings, in the county of Louth. Divided into three books by Thomas Wright, 1758.
- Other engravings from the designs of Inigo Jones, W. Kent, and other architects
- Dr. Humphrey Prideaux's "The Old and New Testament Connected".
