= Couve =

Couve is a primarily French surname. Notable people with the surname include:

- Adolfo Couve (1940–1998), Chilean artist and writer
- Jean-Michel Couve (1940–2025), French cardiologist and politician
- Maurice Couve de Murville (1907–1999), French diplomat and politician
- Maurice Couve de Murville (bishop) (1929–2007), French-born British Roman Catholic bishop
- Tomás Couve (born 1972), Chilean equestrian

== See also ==
- Crécy-Couvé, a commune in northern France
