= Tréon =

- Commune
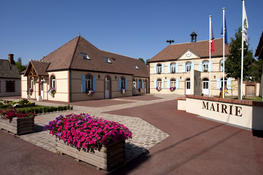
- The town hall in Tréon

- Coat of arms
- Location of Tréon
- Location within France Location within Centre-Val de Loire
- Coordinates: 48°40′36″N 1°19′32″E
- Country: France
- Region: Centre-Val de Loire
- Department: Eure-et-Loir
- Arrondissement: Dreux
- Canton: Dreux-1
- Intercommunality: CA Pays de Dreux

Government
  - Mayor (2020–2026): Christian Berthelier
- Area^{1}: 10.93 km^{2} (4.22 sq mi)
- Elevation: 108 m (354 ft)
- Highest elevation: 172 m (564 ft)
- Lowest elevation: 102 m (335 ft)
- Population (2023): 1,418
  - Density: 129.7/km^{2} (336.0/sq mi)
- Time zone: UTC+01:00 (CET)
  - Summer (DST): UTC+02:00 (CEST)
- INSEE/Postal code: 28394 /28500
- ^{1} French Land Register data, which excludes lakes, ponds, glaciers > 1 km^{2} (0.386 sq mi or 247 acres) and river estuaries.

Tréon (French pronunciation: [tʁeɔ̃]) is a commune in the Eure-et-Loir department in northern France.

== Population ==
Historical population
Year	Pop.	±% p.a.
1968	551	—
1975	631	+1.96%
1982	898	+5.17%
1990	1,179	+3.46%
1999	1,255	+0.70%
2007	1,309	+0.53%
2012	1,363	+0.81%
2017	1,403	+0.58%
2023	1,418	+0.18%
Source: INSEE

== See also ==
- Communes of the Eure-et-Loir department
