= Canton of Dreux-1 =

Coordinates: 48.74°N 1.35°E

The canton of Dreux-1 is an administrative division of the Eure-et-Loir department, northern France. It was created at the French canton reorganisation which came into effect in March 2015. Its seat is in Dreux.

It consists of the following communes:

1. Allainville
2. Aunay-sous-Crécy
3. Boissy-en-Drouais
4. Crécy-Couvé
5. Dreux (partly)
6. Garancières-en-Drouais
7. Garnay
8. Louvilliers-en-Drouais
9. Marville-Moutiers-Brûlé
10. Saulnières
11. Tréon
12. Vernouillet
13. Vert-en-Drouais
