= Sealy Fourdrinier =

English paper-making entrepreneur (1773–1847)

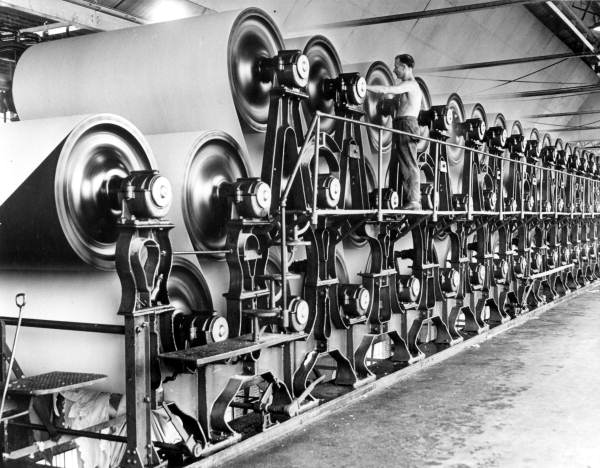
Large Fourdrinier-style paper-making machine. A row of heated drums dry out the paper, which enters the machine as wet pulp. Large rolls are usually sliced into a number of thin rolls, which can feed continuous presses (e.g. newspapers) or be cut into separate sheets.

Sealy Fourdrinier (9 October 1773 – 1847) was an English paper-making entrepreneur.

He was born the son of paper maker and stationer Henry Fourdrinier and grandson of the engraver Paul Fourdrinier (1698-1758), who were of Huguenot descent. His brother was Henry Fourdrinier, his later partner in business.

Around the end of the 18th century Sealy and his brother were approached by John Gamble and Leger Didot, who were seeking financial support to develop an automatic paper making machine developed in Paris by Louis-Nicolas Robert, an employee of Didot. In 1801–02 the Fourdriniers entrusted engineer Bryan Donkin (then working with John Hall) with the development of Robert's model into a prototype continuous paper-making machine. The world's first production machine was installed at Frogmore Paper Mill in Apsley, Hertfordshire in 1803 and a second, much improved and larger machine installed the following year. By 1810 eighteen machines had been installed at various mills.

The cost of developing and improving the machines was of the order of £60,000 and although the inventions were covered by various patents taken out by the Fourdrinier brothers, the costs of manufacture, installation and maintenance and the difficulty of collecting royalties forced the brothers to declare themselves bankrupt in 1810.

The machines themselves, known as Fourdrinier machines, were very successful and continued to be made in considerable numbers by Donkins. In 1837 a Parliamentary Select Committee acknowledged the importance of the Fourdriniers’ contribution to the paper industry and voted them £7000 compensation.

Sealy Fourdrinier died at Southwark in 1847. He had married Harriet Pownall at St Mary Wolnoth, London and had children James Sealy (1805-1870), Harriet (1806-1863), and Louisa Elizabeth (1813-1892). Louisa Elizabeth married the clergyman John Bathurst Deane and became the mother of thirteen children, including Mary Bathurst Deane. Another of her daughters, Eleanor Deane (1861–1941), married Henry Ernest Wodehouse and was the mother of the writer P. G. Wodehouse.
