= Garnay =

- Commune
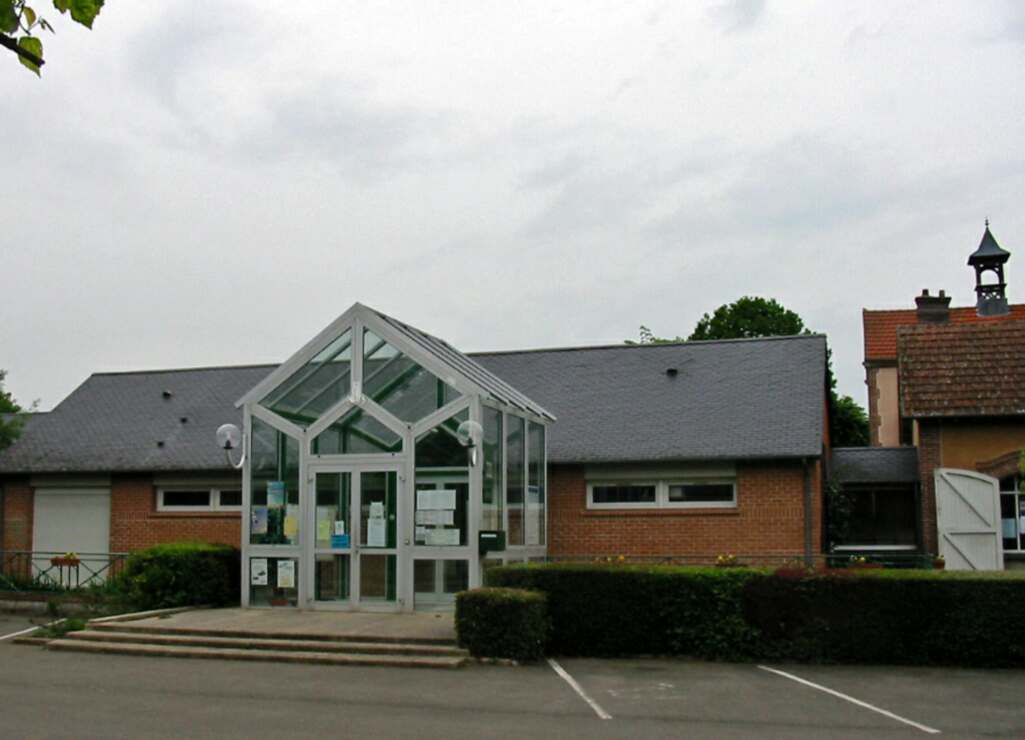
- Town hall
- Location of Garnay
- Location within France Location within Centre-Val de Loire
- Coordinates: 48°42′21″N 1°20′18″E
- Country: France
- Region: Centre-Val de Loire
- Department: Eure-et-Loir
- Arrondissement: Dreux
- Canton: Dreux-1
- Intercommunality: CA Pays de Dreux

Government
  - Mayor (2020–2026): Jean Bartier
- Area^{1}: 14.13 km^{2} (5.46 sq mi)
- Elevation: 118 m (387 ft)
- Highest elevation: 144 m (472 ft)
- Lowest elevation: 94 m (308 ft)
- Population (2023): 1,019
  - Density: 72.12/km^{2} (186.8/sq mi)
- Time zone: UTC+01:00 (CET)
  - Summer (DST): UTC+02:00 (CEST)
- INSEE/Postal code: 28171 /28500
- ^{1} French Land Register data, which excludes lakes, ponds, glaciers > 1 km^{2} (0.386 sq mi or 247 acres) and river estuaries.

Garnay (French pronunciation: [ɡaʁnɛ]) is a commune in the Eure-et-Loir department in northern France.

== Population ==
Historical population
Year	Pop.	±% p.a.
1968	363	—
1975	566	+6.55%
1982	975	+8.08%
1990	1,059	+1.04%
1999	972	−0.95%
2007	910	−0.82%
2012	896	−0.31%
2017	876	−0.45%
2023	1,019	+2.55%
Source: INSEE

== See also ==
- Communes of the Eure-et-Loir department
