= Garancières-en-Drouais =

- Commune
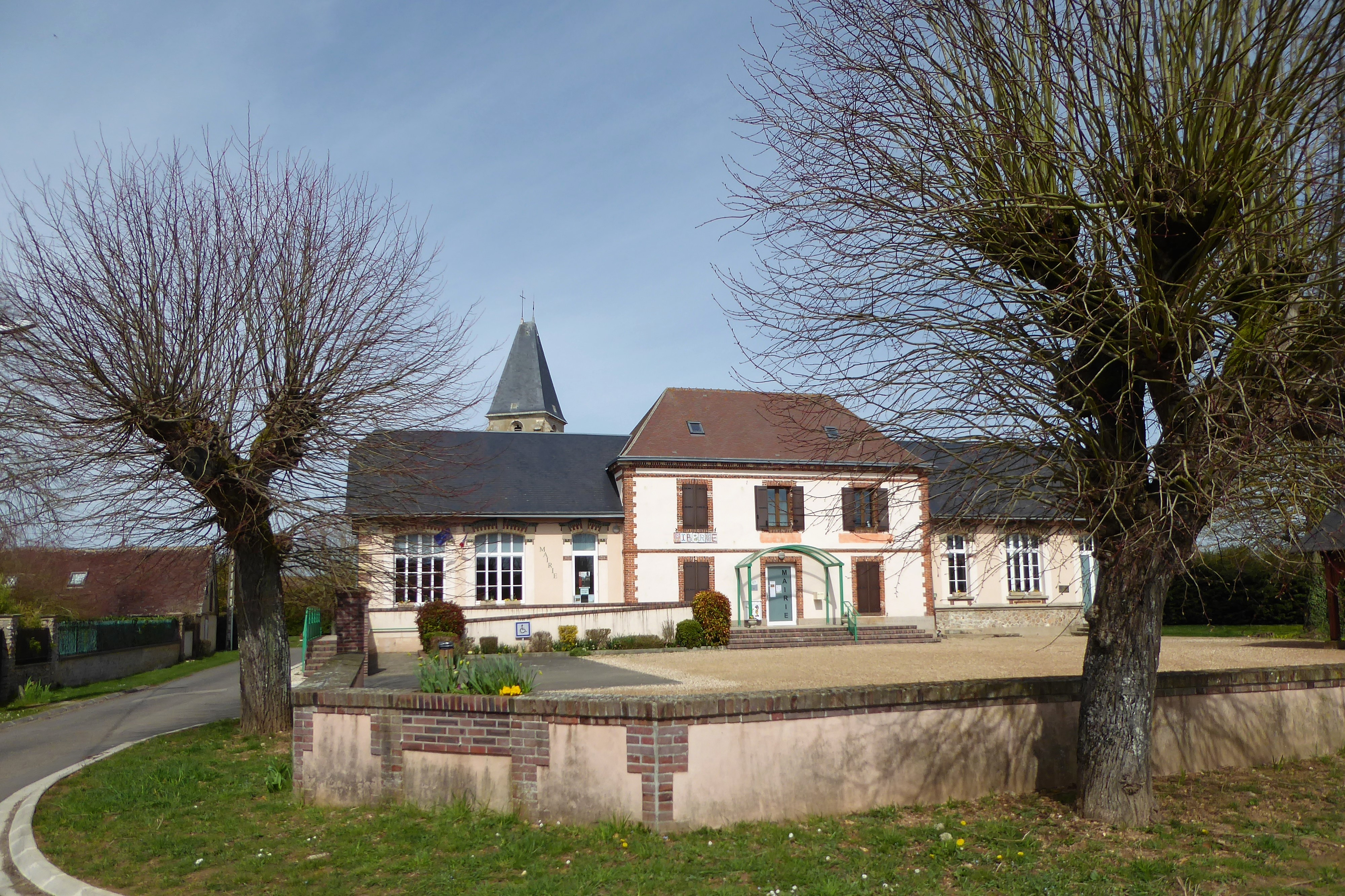
- The town hall and school in Garancières-en-Drouais
- Location of Garancières-en-Drouais
- Location within France Location within Centre-Val de Loire
- Coordinates: 48°42′08″N 1°17′10″E
- Country: France
- Region: Centre-Val de Loire
- Department: Eure-et-Loir
- Arrondissement: Dreux
- Canton: Dreux-1
- Intercommunality: CA Pays de Dreux

Government
  - Mayor (2020–2026): François Cenier
- Area^{1}: 6.46 km^{2} (2.49 sq mi)
- Elevation: 136 m (446 ft)
- Highest elevation: 160 m (520 ft)
- Lowest elevation: 130 m (430 ft)
- Population (2023): 272
  - Density: 42.1/km^{2} (109/sq mi)
- Time zone: UTC+01:00 (CET)
  - Summer (DST): UTC+02:00 (CEST)
- INSEE/Postal code: 28170 /28500
- ^{1} French Land Register data, which excludes lakes, ponds, glaciers > 1 km^{2} (0.386 sq mi or 247 acres) and river estuaries.

Garancières-en-Drouais is a commune in the Eure-et-Loir department in northern France.

== Population ==
Historical population
Year	Pop.	±% p.a.
1968	156	—
1975	171	+1.32%
1982	211	+3.05%
1990	265	+2.89%
1999	254	−0.47%
2007	273	+0.91%
2012	292	+1.35%
2017	274	−1.26%
2023	272	−0.12%
Source: INSEE

== See also ==
- Communes of the Eure-et-Loir department
