= Vert-en-Drouais =

- Commune
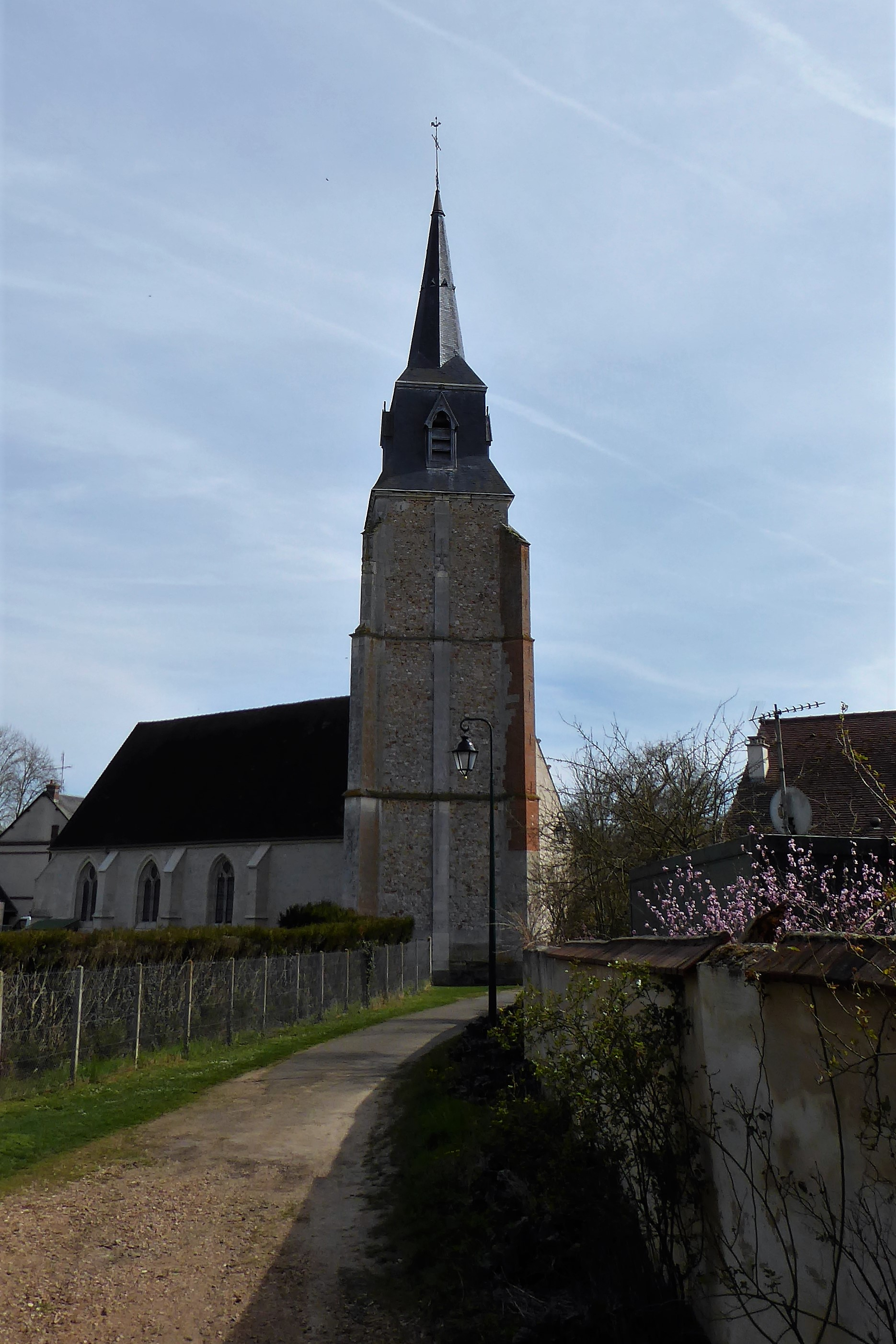
- The church in Vert-en-Drouais
- Location of Vert-en-Drouais
- Location within France Location within Centre-Val de Loire
- Coordinates: 48°45′40″N 1°17′45″E
- Country: France
- Region: Centre-Val de Loire
- Department: Eure-et-Loir
- Arrondissement: Dreux
- Canton: Dreux-1
- Intercommunality: CA Pays de Dreux

Government
  - Mayor (2020–2026): Evelyne Delaplace
- Area^{1}: 9.7 km^{2} (3.7 sq mi)
- Elevation: 106 m (348 ft)
- Highest elevation: 140 m (460 ft)
- Lowest elevation: 80 m (260 ft)
- Population (2023): 1,123
  - Density: 120/km^{2} (300/sq mi)
- Time zone: UTC+01:00 (CET)
  - Summer (DST): UTC+02:00 (CEST)
- INSEE/Postal code: 28405 /28500
- ^{1} French Land Register data, which excludes lakes, ponds, glaciers > 1 km^{2} (0.386 sq mi or 247 acres) and river estuaries.

Vert-en-Drouais is a commune in the Eure-et-Loir department in northern France.

== Population ==
Historical population
Year	Pop.	±% p.a.
1968	466	—
1975	620	+4.16%
1982	720	+2.16%
1990	1,034	+4.63%
1999	1,039	+0.05%
2007	1,054	+0.18%
2012	1,160	+1.94%
2017	1,091	−1.22%
2023	1,123	+0.48%
Source: INSEE

== See also ==
- Communes of the Eure-et-Loir department
