= Boissy-en-Drouais =

- Commune
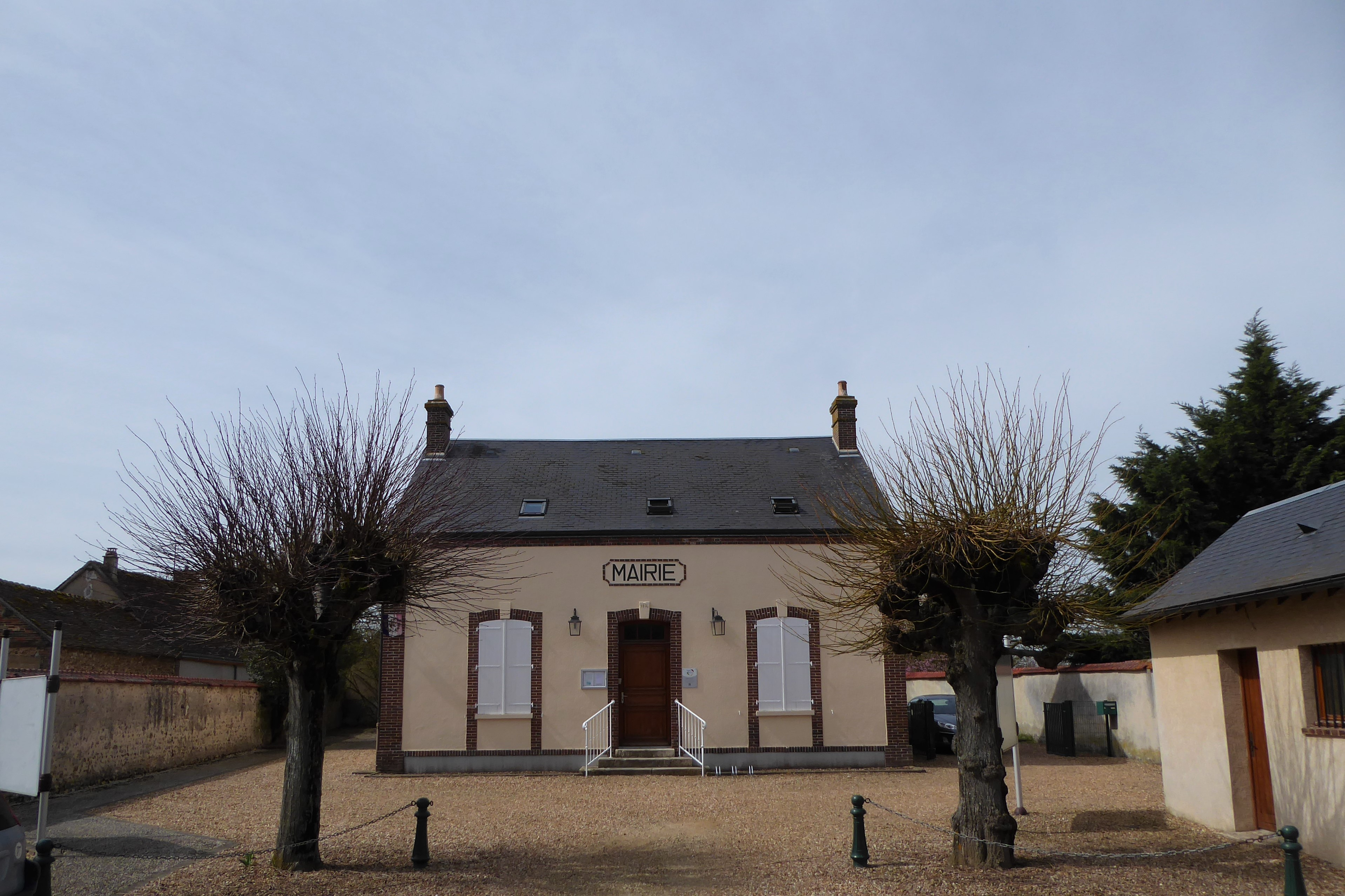
- The town hall in Boissy-en-Drouais

- Coat of arms
- Location of Boissy-en-Drouais
- Location within France Location within Centre-Val de Loire
- Coordinates: 48°43′45″N 1°15′43″E
- Country: France
- Region: Centre-Val de Loire
- Department: Eure-et-Loir
- Arrondissement: Dreux
- Canton: Dreux-1
- Intercommunality: CA Pays de Dreux

Government
  - Mayor (2020–2026): Ghislaine Barbe
- Area^{1}: 6.03 km^{2} (2.33 sq mi)
- Elevation: 140 m (460 ft)
- Highest elevation: 151 m (495 ft)
- Lowest elevation: 115 m (377 ft)
- Population (2023): 226
  - Density: 37.5/km^{2} (97.1/sq mi)
- Time zone: UTC+01:00 (CET)
  - Summer (DST): UTC+02:00 (CEST)
- INSEE/Postal code: 28045 /28500
- ^{1} French Land Register data, which excludes lakes, ponds, glaciers > 1 km^{2} (0.386 sq mi or 247 acres) and river estuaries.

Boissy-en-Drouais is a commune in the Eure-et-Loir department in northern France.

== Population ==
Historical population
Year	Pop.	±% p.a.
1968	109	—
1975	107	−0.26%
1982	153	+5.24%
1990	204	+3.66%
1999	238	+1.73%
2007	243	+0.26%
2012	216	−2.33%
2017	210	−0.56%
2023	226	+1.23%
Source: INSEE

== See also ==
- Communes of the Eure-et-Loir department
