= Marville-Moutiers-Brûlé =

- Commune
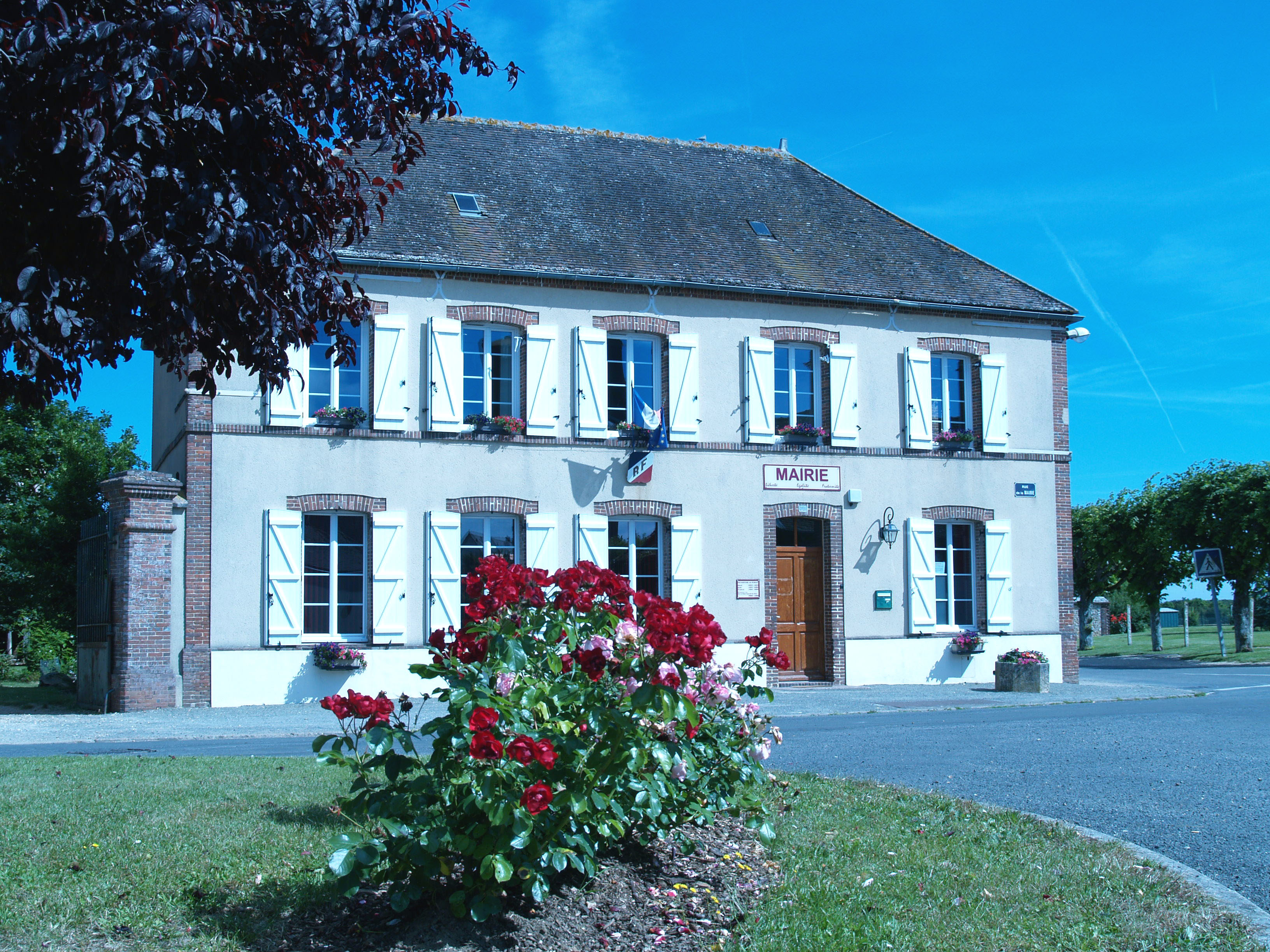
- The town hall in Marville-Moutiers-Brûlé
- Location of Marville-Moutiers-Brûlé
- Location within France Location within Centre-Val de Loire
- Coordinates: 48°40′31″N 1°23′22″E
- Country: France
- Region: Centre-Val de Loire
- Department: Eure-et-Loir
- Arrondissement: Dreux
- Canton: Dreux-1
- Intercommunality: CA Pays de Dreux

Government
  - Mayor (2020–2026): Véronique Baston
- Area^{1}: 20.24 km^{2} (7.81 sq mi)
- Elevation: 136 m (446 ft)
- Highest elevation: 175 m (574 ft)
- Lowest elevation: 110 m (360 ft)
- Population (2023): 1,024
  - Density: 50.59/km^{2} (131.0/sq mi)
- Time zone: UTC+01:00 (CET)
  - Summer (DST): UTC+02:00 (CEST)
- INSEE/Postal code: 28239 /28500
- ^{1} French Land Register data, which excludes lakes, ponds, glaciers > 1 km^{2} (0.386 sq mi or 247 acres) and river estuaries.

Marville-Moutiers-Brûlé (French pronunciation: [maʁvil mutje bʁyle]) is a commune in the Eure-et-Loir department in northern France.

== Population ==
Historical population
| Year | Pop. | ±% p.a. |
|---|---|---|
| 1968 | 506 | — |
| 1975 | 630 | +3.18% |
| 1982 | 737 | +2.27% |
| 1990 | 838 | +1.62% |
| 1999 | 826 | −0.16% |
| 2007 | 902 | +1.11% |
| 2012 | 919 | +0.37% |
| 2017 | 976 | +1.21% |
| 2023 | 1,024 | +0.80% |
Source: INSEE

== See also ==
- Communes of the Eure-et-Loir department
