= Saulnières, Eure-et-Loir =

Saulnières
- Commune
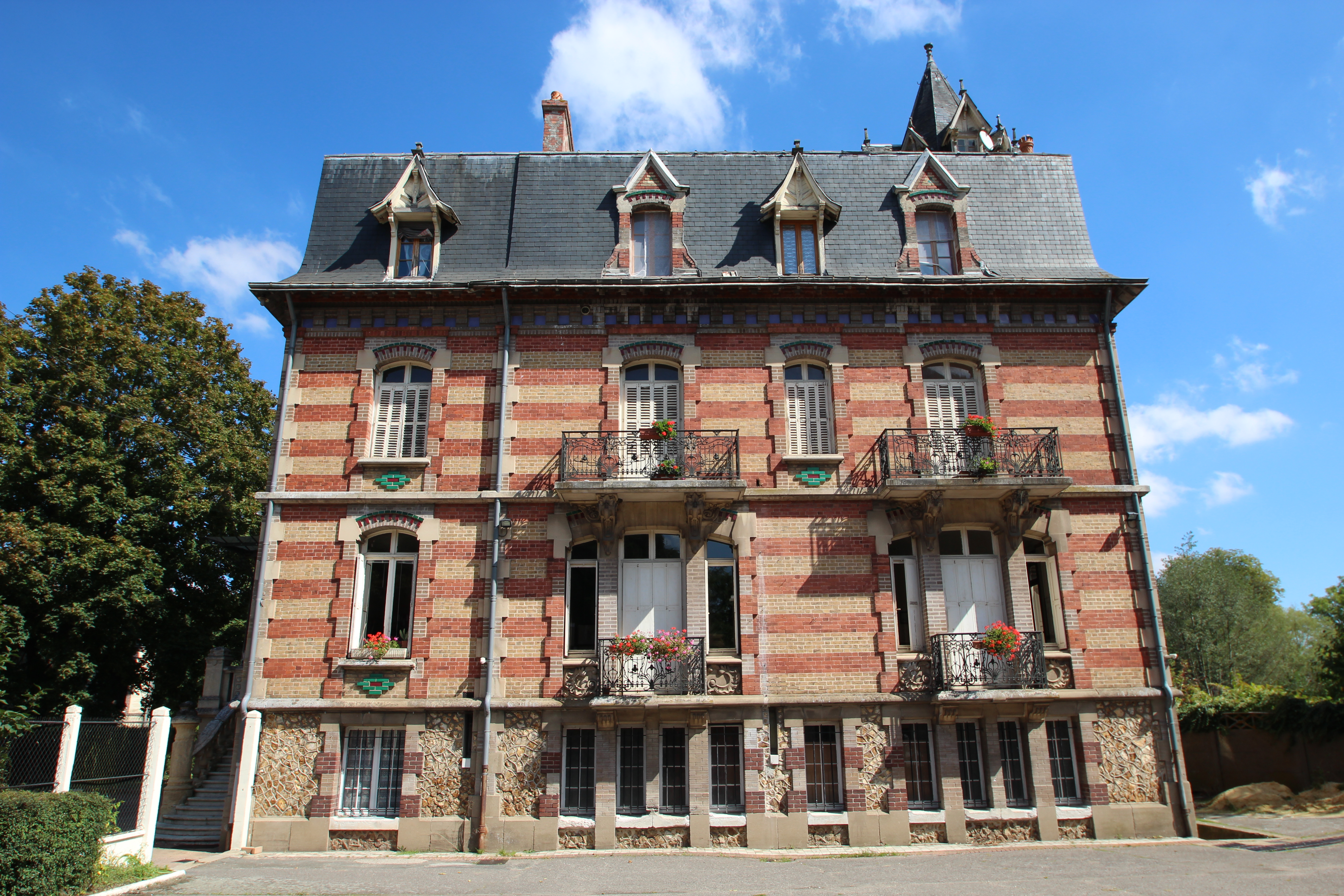
- The town hall in Saulnières
- Location of Saulnières
- Location within France Location within Centre-Val de Loire
- Coordinates: 48°39′39″N 1°16′23″E
- Country: France
- Region: Centre-Val de Loire
- Department: Eure-et-Loir
- Arrondissement: Dreux
- Canton: Dreux-1
- Intercommunality: CA Pays de Dreux

Government
  - Mayor (2020–2026): Christian Albert
- Area^{1}: 10.65 km^{2} (4.11 sq mi)
- Elevation: 170 m (560 ft)
- Highest elevation: 169 m (554 ft)
- Lowest elevation: 116 m (381 ft)
- Population (2023): 751
  - Density: 70.5/km^{2} (183/sq mi)
- Time zone: UTC+01:00 (CET)
  - Summer (DST): UTC+02:00 (CEST)
- INSEE/Postal code: 28369 /28500
- ^{1} French Land Register data, which excludes lakes, ponds, glaciers > 1 km^{2} (0.386 sq mi or 247 acres) and river estuaries.

Saulnières (French pronunciation: [so(l)njɛʁ]) is a commune in the Eure-et-Loir department in northern France.

== Population ==
Historical population
| Year | Pop. | ±% p.a. |
|---|---|---|
| 1968 | 357 | — |
| 1975 | 371 | +0.55% |
| 1982 | 475 | +3.59% |
| 1990 | 469 | −0.16% |
| 1999 | 538 | +1.54% |
| 2007 | 595 | +1.27% |
| 2012 | 643 | +1.56% |
| 2017 | 709 | +1.97% |
| 2023 | 751 | +0.96% |
Source: INSEE

== See also ==
- Communes of the Eure-et-Loir department
