= Louvilliers-en-Drouais =

- Commune
- Location of Louvilliers-en-Drouais
- Location within France Location within Centre-Val de Loire
- Coordinates: 48°43′57″N 1°17′20″E
- Country: France
- Region: Centre-Val de Loire
- Department: Eure-et-Loir
- Arrondissement: Dreux
- Canton: Dreux-1
- Intercommunality: CA Pays de Dreux

Government
  - Mayor (2020–2026): Dominique Garnier
- Area^{1}: 4.14 km^{2} (1.60 sq mi)
- Elevation: 136 m (446 ft)
- Highest elevation: 143 m (469 ft)
- Lowest elevation: 124 m (407 ft)
- Population (2023): 230
  - Density: 56/km^{2} (140/sq mi)
- Time zone: UTC+01:00 (CET)
  - Summer (DST): UTC+02:00 (CEST)
- INSEE/Postal code: 28216 /28500
- ^{1} French Land Register data, which excludes lakes, ponds, glaciers > 1 km^{2} (0.386 sq mi or 247 acres) and river estuaries.

Louvilliers-en-Drouais is a commune in the Eure-et-Loir department in northern France.

== Population ==
Historical population
| Year | Pop. | ±% p.a. |
|---|---|---|
| 1968 | 62 | — |
| 1975 | 72 | +2.16% |
| 1982 | 145 | +10.52% |
| 1990 | 179 | +2.67% |
| 1999 | 172 | −0.44% |
| 2007 | 196 | +1.65% |
| 2012 | 204 | +0.80% |
| 2017 | 201 | −0.30% |
| 2023 | 230 | +2.27% |
Source: INSEE

== See also ==
- Communes of the Eure-et-Loir department
