= Vernouillet, Eure-et-Loir =

Vernouillet
- Commune
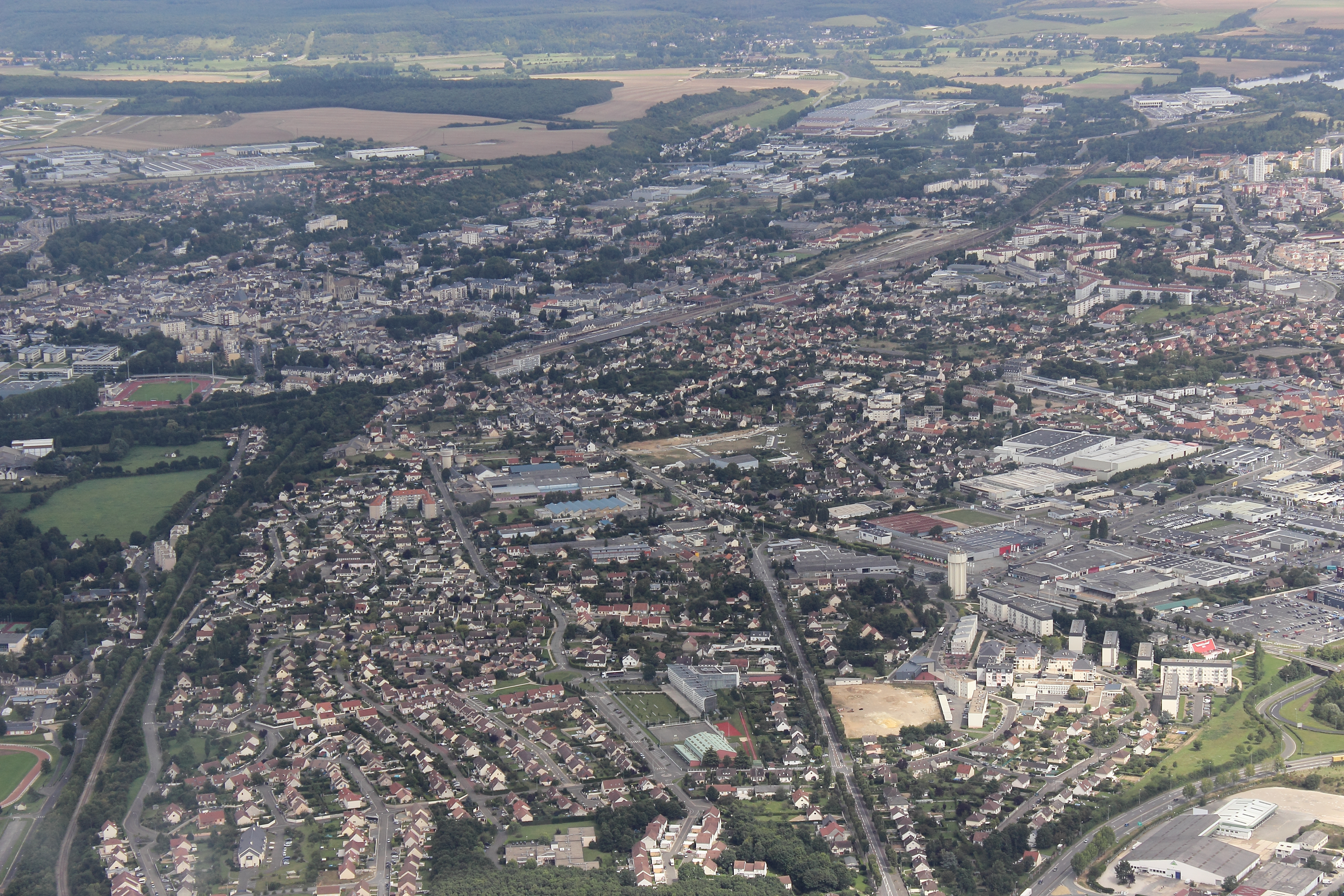
- An aerial view of Vernouillet {lower left} and Dreux
- Location of Vernouillet
- Location within France Location within Centre-Val de Loire
- Coordinates: 48°43′18″N 1°21′41″E
- Country: France
- Region: Centre-Val de Loire
- Department: Eure-et-Loir
- Arrondissement: Dreux
- Canton: Dreux-1
- Intercommunality: CA Pays de Dreux

Government
  - Mayor (2020–2026): Damien Stepho
- Area^{1}: 12.11 km^{2} (4.68 sq mi)
- Highest elevation: 137 m (449 ft)
- Lowest elevation: 89 m (292 ft)
- Population (2023): 12,310
  - Density: 1,017/km^{2} (2,633/sq mi)
- Time zone: UTC+01:00 (CET)
  - Summer (DST): UTC+02:00 (CEST)
- INSEE/Postal code: 28404 /28500
- ^{1} French Land Register data, which excludes lakes, ponds, glaciers > 1 km^{2} (0.386 sq mi or 247 acres) and river estuaries.

Vernouillet (French pronunciation: [vɛʁnujɛ]) is a commune in the Eure-et-Loir department in northern France.

It lies adjacent to the south side of the town of Dreux.

== Population ==
Historical population
Year	Pop.	±% p.a.
1968	4,070	—
1975	8,142	+10.41%
1982	10,318	+3.44%
1990	11,680	+1.56%
1999	11,496	−0.18%
2007	11,897	+0.43%
2012	11,899	+0.00%
2017	12,506	+1.00%
2023	12,310	−0.26%
Source: INSEE

== Vernouillet Airport ==
Built prior to World War II as a civil airport, Vernouillet Airport was seized by the Germans in June 1940 during the Battle of France. They used it as a major Luftwaffe military airfield during the occupation. It was liberated by Allied ground forces about 21 August 1944 during the Northern France Campaign. It was then used by the United States Army Air Force Ninth Air Force as a combat Advanced Landing Ground. Declared operational on 26 August, the airfield was designated as "A-41", and was used by combat units until the end of the war. Afterward the airport was returned to civil control. The airport was closed after the war due to a conflict of airspace with the expanding Orly Airport near Paris, and is now a small grass airfield general aviation airport with no commercial traffic.

== Twin towns – sister cities ==
Vernouillet is twinned with:

- Cheddar, England, United Kingdom
- Felsberg, Germany

== Notable people ==
- Louis-Nicolas Robert (1761–1828), inventor of the Fourdrinier machine. He is commemorated by a statue in front of the church. Also, the Collège de Louis-Nicolas Robert in the quartier des Grandes Vauvettes is named in his honour.

== See also ==
- Communes of the Eure-et-Loir department
