= Frogmore Paper Mill =

Paper mill in Hertfordshire, England

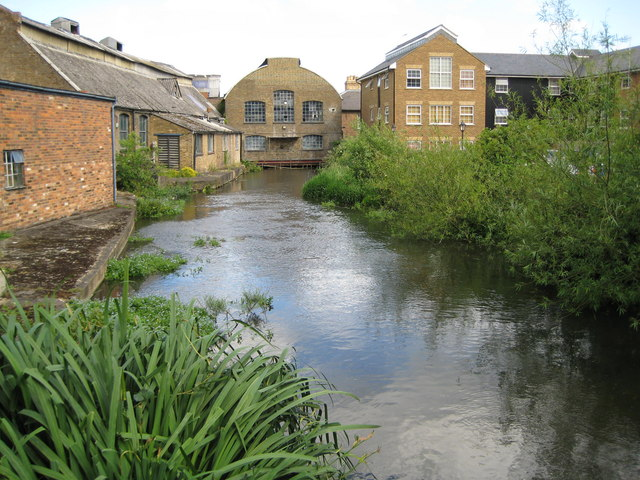
- View from Durrants Hill Road Bridge

General information
- Coordinates: 51.7385°N 0.4683°W
- Owner: The Apsley Paper Trail

Website
- www.frogmorepapermill.org.uk

Frogmore Paper Mill is a working paper mill situated in Apsley, Hertfordshire, near Hemel Hempstead. The mill is on an island in the River Gade, which forms part of the Grand Union Canal. It is the oldest mechanical paper mill in the world.

== History ==
There are no surviving records documenting when a mill was first built on the current site, but it is recorded as being a corn mill in 1086 in the Domesday Book. In 1289, the mill was used for fulling; removing oil and other impurities from woolen cloth. It returned to milling grain, then became a fulling mill once more, then finally it had become a paper mill by 1774. The world's first mechanised paper machine was installed at Frogmore Mill in 1803 funded by Sealy and Henry Fourdrinier and engineered by Bryan Donkin, based upon a design by Nicolas-Louis Robert. This machine allowed continuous automated production of paper rolls. Unfortunately the £60,000 costs of developing the paper machines meant that the Fourdrinier brothers were bankrupted by 1810.

For most of the 19th century, the mill was owned by the Grand Junction Canal, predecessor of the Grand Union Canal. In 1851, the chemical production of paper from wood (now known as soda pulp), used in newspapers, began at the mill. From 1853 to 1887 the mill was linked to Two Waters Mill, also near Hemel Hempstead. In 1890, the British Paper Company was founded and took over operations at the mill; it fully purchased the premises in 1929.

In 2000 the British Paper Company ceased operations and the Apsley Paper Trail was opened to the public.

In 2008 a visitor centre was built with financial support from the Heritage Lottery Fund. The visitor centre was badly damaged in a fire in January 2022.

== Operations ==
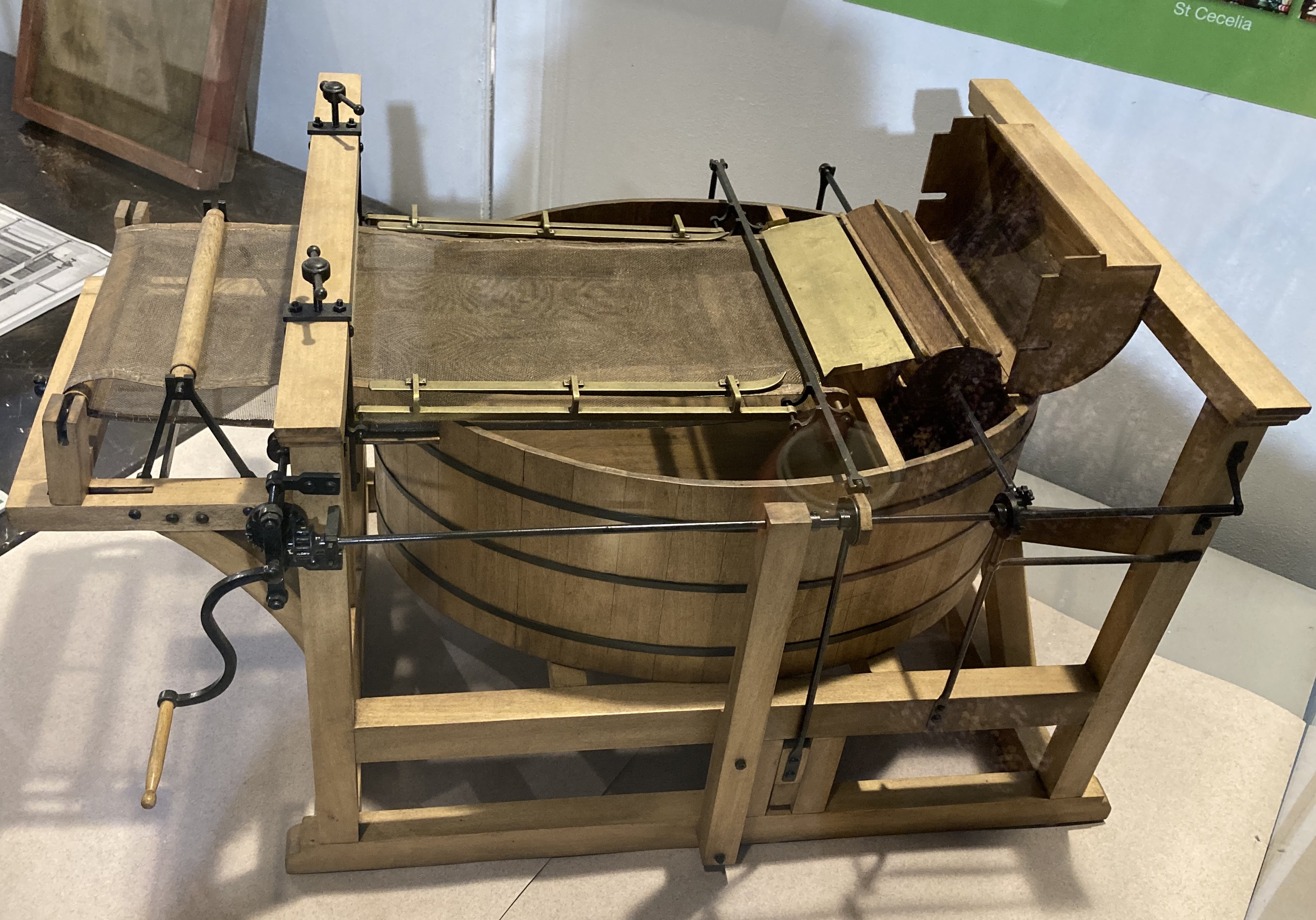
Model of the Robert continuous paper making machine at Frogmore Paper Mill

The mill is run by The Apsley Paper Trail, a charitable organisation, and operated as a visitor, education and community use centre. Eleven full-time staff are employed at the mill. It has been used for various theatrical productions, including the rock musical Rent.

== In popular culture ==
The mill has been used for multiple productions including Silent Witness, Whitechapel, Battle of Stalingrad, Carnage, Justice League, a Sky Mobile Commercial featuring Tom Hardy, and ManLab.

It has also featured in multiple documentaries addressing its significance in the industrial revolution. Notable examples include Flog it! and More Industrial Revelations.
