= Allainville, Eure-et-Loir =

Allainville
- Commune
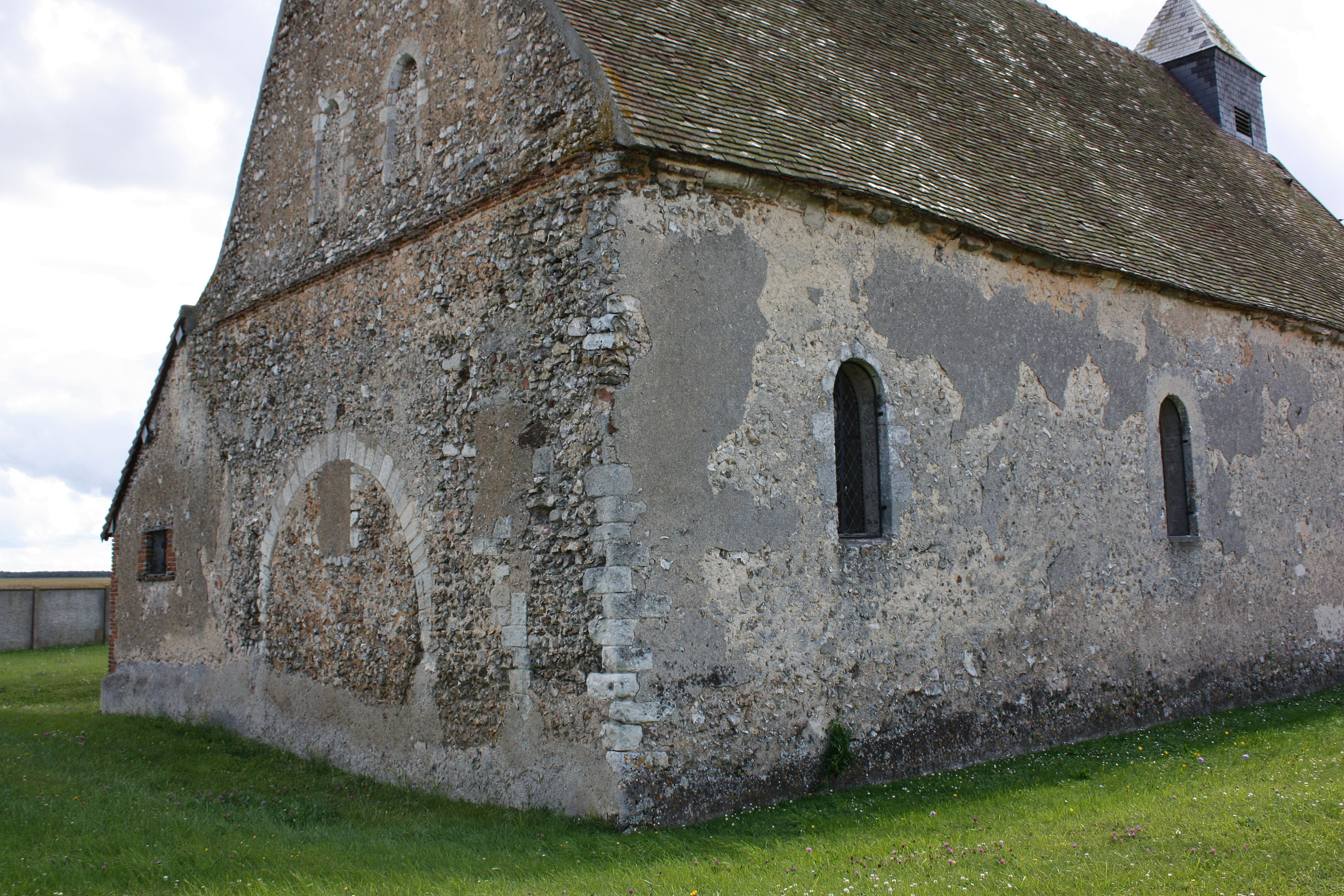
- The church in Allainville
- Location of Allainville
- Location within France Location within Centre-Val de Loire
- Coordinates: 48°43′25″N 1°18′06″E
- Country: France
- Region: Centre-Val de Loire
- Department: Eure-et-Loir
- Arrondissement: Dreux
- Canton: Dreux-1
- Intercommunality: Pays de Dreux

Government
  - Mayor (2020–2026): Alain Caperan
- Area^{1}: 5.28 km^{2} (2.04 sq mi)
- Elevation: 136 m (446 ft)
- Highest elevation: 147 m (482 ft)
- Lowest elevation: 118 m (387 ft)
- Population (2023): 159
  - Density: 30.1/km^{2} (78.0/sq mi)
- Time zone: UTC+01:00 (CET)
  - Summer (DST): UTC+02:00 (CEST)
- INSEE/Postal code: 28003 /28500
- ^{1} French Land Register data, which excludes lakes, ponds, glaciers > 1 km^{2} (0.386 sq mi or 247 acres) and river estuaries.

Allainville (French pronunciation: [alɛ̃vil]) is a commune in the Eure-et-Loir department in northern France.

== Population ==
Historical population
Year	Pop.	±% p.a.
1968	42	—
1975	35	−2.57%
1982	82	+12.93%
1990	124	+5.31%
1999	120	−0.36%
2007	154	+3.17%
2012	140	−1.89%
2017	136	−0.58%
2023	159	+2.64%
Source: INSEE

== See also ==
- Communes of the Eure-et-Loir department
