= Crécy-Couvé =

- Commune
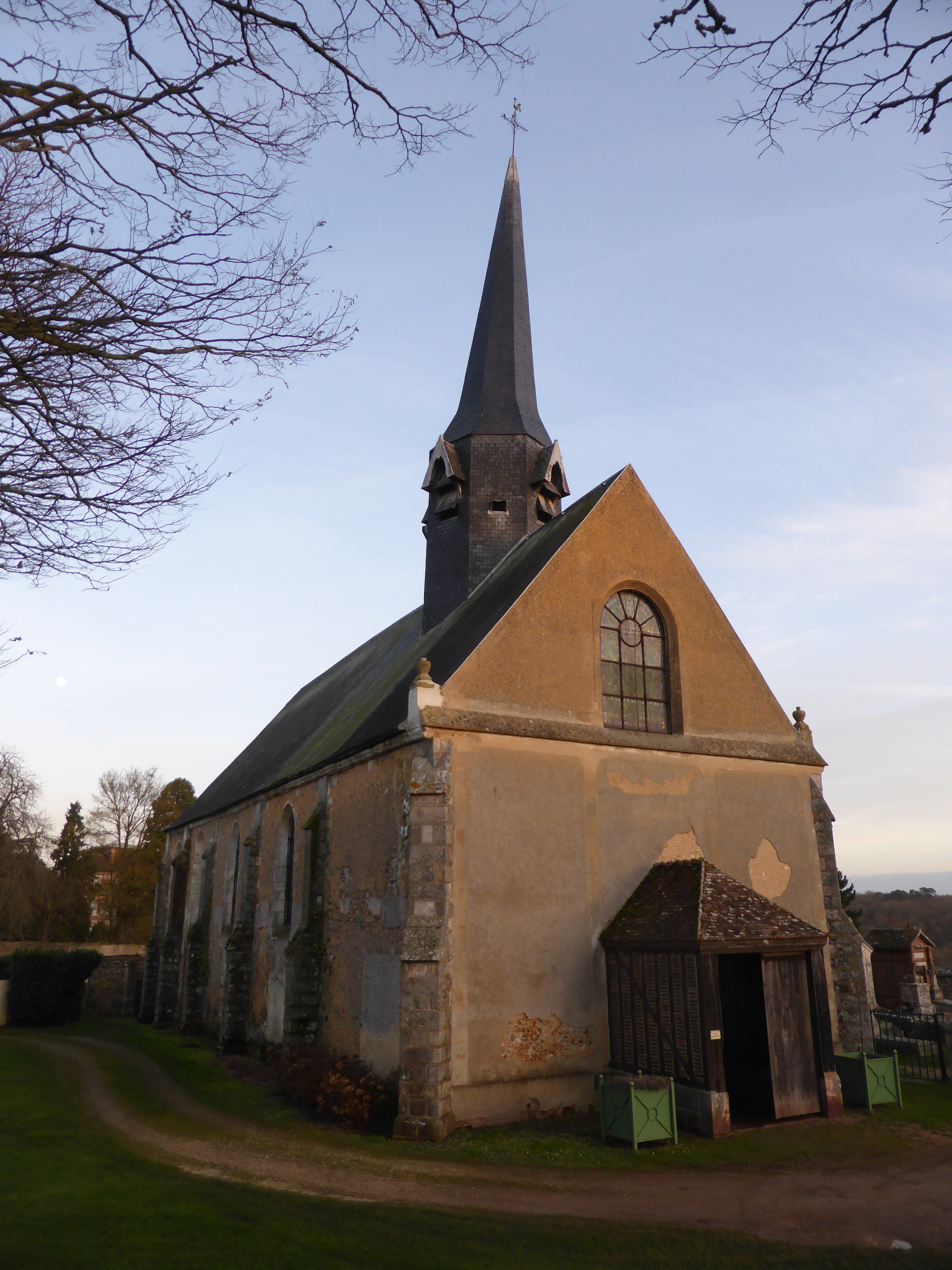
- The church in Crécy-Couvé

- Coat of arms
- Location of Crécy-Couvé
- Location within France Location within Centre-Val de Loire
- Coordinates: 48°40′11″N 1°16′56″E
- Country: France
- Region: Centre-Val de Loire
- Department: Eure-et-Loir
- Arrondissement: Dreux
- Canton: Dreux-1
- Intercommunality: CA Pays de Dreux

Government
  - Mayor (2020–2026): Didier Arnoult
- Area^{1}: 6.65 km^{2} (2.57 sq mi)
- Elevation: 65 m (213 ft)
- Highest elevation: 166 m (545 ft)
- Lowest elevation: 107 m (351 ft)
- Population (2023): 255
  - Density: 38.3/km^{2} (99.3/sq mi)
- Time zone: UTC+01:00 (CET)
  - Summer (DST): UTC+02:00 (CEST)
- INSEE/Postal code: 28117 /28500
- ^{1} French Land Register data, which excludes lakes, ponds, glaciers > 1 km^{2} (0.386 sq mi or 247 acres) and river estuaries.

Crécy-Couvé (French pronunciation: [kʁesi kuve]) is a commune in the Eure-et-Loir department in northern France.

== Population ==
Historical population
Year	Pop.	±% p.a.
1968	256	—
1975	279	+1.24%
1982	262	−0.89%
1990	316	+2.37%
1999	281	−1.30%
2007	277	−0.18%
2012	261	−1.18%
2017	264	+0.23%
2023	255	−0.58%
Source: INSEE

== See also ==
- Communes of the Eure-et-Loir department
