= Paper machine =

Industrial machine used in the pulp and paper industry

External image
- Watch video of paper machine

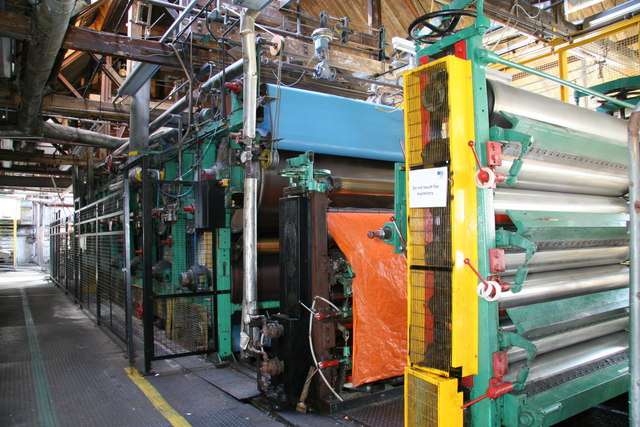
A Fourdrinier paper machine

A paper machine (or papermachine or paper-making machine) is an industrial machine which is used in the pulp and paper industry to create paper in large quantities at high speed. Modern paper-making machines are based on the principles of the Fourdrinier Machine, which uses a moving woven mesh to create a continuous paper web by filtering out the fibres held in a paper stock and producing a continuously moving wet mat of fibre. This is dried in the machine to produce a strong paper web.

The basic process is an industrialised version of the historical process of hand paper-making, which could not satisfy the demands of developing modern society for large quantities of a printing and writing substrate. The first modern paper machine was invented by Louis-Nicolas Robert in France in 1799, and an improved version patented in Britain by Henry and Sealy Fourdrinier in 1806.

The same process is used to produce paperboard on a paperboard machine.

== Process sections ==
Paper machines are composed of different sections, depending on the product they are designed to make. Forming, pressing and drying are common to all types. A more complete list of sections is as follows:

- Forming section, commonly called the wet end or wire section, is a continuous rotating wire mesh which removes water from the paper by sucking it out of suspension via vacuum.
- Press section, where the wet fibre web passes between large rolls loaded under high pressure to squeeze out as much water as possible.
- Drying section, where the pressed sheet passes partly around, in a serpentine manner, a series of steam heated drying cylinders. Drying removes the water content down to a level of about 6%, where it will remain at typical indoor atmospheric conditions. Infra-red driers may also be also used to supplement cylinder drying where required.
- Size Press section, used on certain machines, is where the semi-dried paper is applied with a thin layer of starch and/ or other chemicals to improve several paper properties, reduce dusting and air permeability, increase stiffness, bursting strength and short span compression. The size press is typically used for printing and writing papers.
- Calender section, where the dried paper is smoothened under high loading and pressure. Only one nip (where the sheet is pressed between two rolls) is necessary in order to hold the sheet, which shrinks through the drying section and is held in tension between the press section (or breaker stack if used) and the calendar. Extra nips give more smoothing, but at some expense to paper strength. The calendar section can either be a part of the machine (On-line) or in a separate part of the paper mill (Off-line).
- Reel section, where paper coming out of the machine is wound onto individual spools for further processing.

There can also be a coating section to modify the surface characteristics with coatings such as kaolin clay, alternatively known as china clay. This section can be on-line or off-line as well.

== History ==
Before the invention of continuous paper making, paper was made in individual sheets by stirring a container of pulp slurry and either pouring it into a fabric sieve called a sheet mould or dipping and lifting the sheet mould from the vat. While still on the fabric in the sheet mould, the wet paper was pressed to remove excess water. The sheet was then lifted off to be hung over a rope or wooden rod to air dry.

=== Fourdrinier machine ===
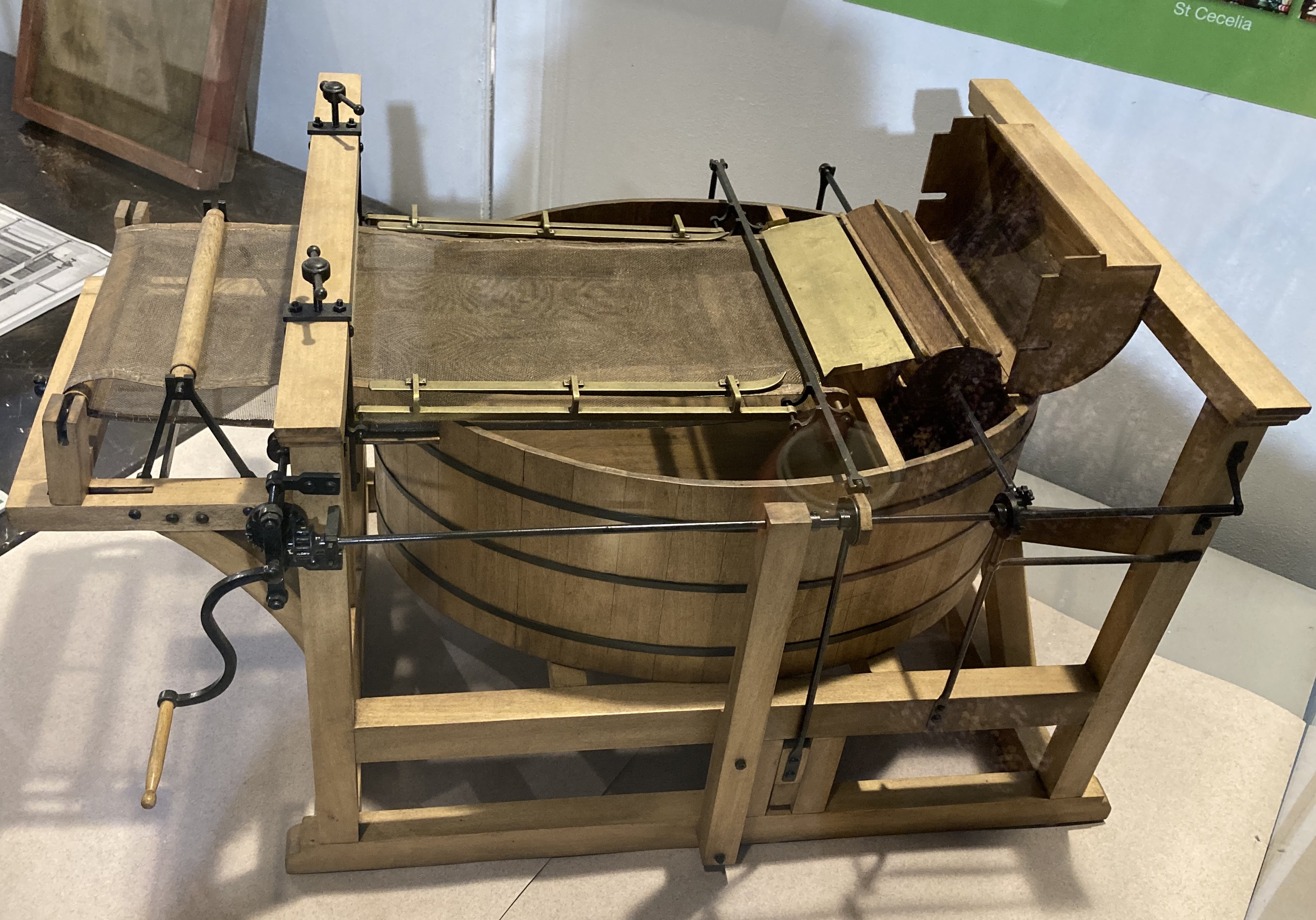
Model of a Fourdrinier continuous paper making machine at Frogmore Paper Mill

In 1799, Louis-Nicolas Robert of Essonnes, France, was granted a patent for a continuous paper making machine. At the time, Robert was working for Saint-Léger Didot, with whom he quarreled over the ownership of the invention. Didot believed that England was a better place to develop the machine but due to the turbulence of the French Revolution, he could not go there himself, so he sent his brother-in-law, John Gamble, an Englishman living in Paris. Through a chain of acquaintances, Gamble was introduced to the brothers Sealy and Henry Fourdrinier, stationers of London, who agreed to finance the project. Gamble was granted British patent 2487 on October 20, 1801. The Fourdrinier machine used a specially woven fabric mesh conveyor belt (known as a wire, as it was once woven from bronze) in the forming section, where a slurry of fibre (usually wood or other vegetable fibres) is drained to create a continuous paper web. The original Fourdrinier forming section used a horizontal drainage area, referred to as the drainage table.

With the help of Bryan Donkin, a skilled and ingenious mechanic, an improved version of the Robert original was installed at Frogmore Paper Mill, Apsley, Hertfordshire, in 1803, followed by another in 1804. A third machine was installed at the Fourdriniers' own mill at Two Waters. The Fourdriniers also bought a mill at St Neots intending to install two machines there, and the process and machines continued to develop.

Close to Frogmore Mill in Apsley, John Dickinson designed and built an alternate machine type; a Cylinder Mould Machine in 1809.

Thomas Gilpin is most often credited for creating the first U.S. cylinder type papermaking machine at Brandywine Creek, Delaware, in 1817. This machine was a cylinder mould machine. The Fourdrinier machine was not introduced into the U.S. until 1827.

=== Similar designs ===
Records show Charles Kinsey of Paterson, NJ had already patented a continuous process papermaking machine in 1807. Kinsey's machine was built locally by Daniel Sawn and by 1809 the Kinsey machine was successfully making paper at the Essex Mill in Paterson. Financial stress and potential opportunities created by the Embargo of 1807 eventually persuaded Kinsey and his backers to change the mill's focus from paper to cotton and Kinsey's early papermaking successes were soon overlooked and forgotten.

Gilpin's 1817 patent was similar to Kinsey's, as was the John Ames patent of 1822. The Ames patent was challenged by his competitors, asserting that Kinsey was the original inventor and Ames had been stealing other people's ideas, their evidence being the employment of Daniel Sawn to work on his machine.

=== Related inventions ===
The method of continuous production demonstrated by the paper machine influenced the development of continuous rolling of iron and later steel and other continuous production processes.

== Pulp types and their preparations ==
The plant fibres used for pulp are composed mostly of cellulose and hemi-cellulose, which have a tendency to form molecular linkages between fibres in the presence of water. After the water evaporates the fibres remain bonded. It is not necessary to add additional binders for most paper grades, although both wet and dry strength additives may be added.

Rags of cotton and linen were the major source of pulp for paper before wood pulp. Today almost all pulp is of wood fibre. Cotton fibre is used in speciality grades, usually in printing paper for such things as resumes and currency.

Sources of rags often appear as waste from other manufacturing such as denim fragments or glove cuts. Fibres from clothing come from the cotton boll. The fibres can range from 3 to 7 cm in length as they exist in the cotton field. Bleach and other chemicals remove the colour from the fabric in a process of cooking, usually with steam. The cloth fragments mechanically abrade into fibres, and the fibres get shortened to a length appropriate for manufacturing paper with a cutting process. Rags and water dump into a trough forming a closed loop. A cylinder with cutting edges, or knives, and a knife bed is part of the loop. The spinning cylinder pushes the contents of the trough around repeatedly. As it lowers slowly over a period of hours, it breaks the rags up into fibres, and cuts the fibres to the desired length. The cutting process terminates when the mix has passed the cylinder enough times at the programmed final clearance of the knives and bed.

Another source of cotton fibre comes from the cotton ginning process. The seeds remain, surrounded by short fibres known as linters for their short length and resemblance to lint. Linters are too short for successful use in fabric. Linters removed from the cotton seeds are available as first and second cuts. The first cuts are longer.

The two major classifications of pulp are chemical and mechanical. Chemical pulps formerly used a sulphite process, but the kraft process is now predominant. Kraft pulp has superior strength to sulphite and mechanical pulps and kraft process spent pulping chemicals are easier to recover and regenerate. Both chemical pulps and mechanical pulps may be bleached to a high brightness.

Chemical pulping dissolves the lignin that bonds fibres to one another, and binds the outer fibrils that compose individual fibres to the fibre core. Lignin, like most other substances that can separate fibres from one another, acts as a debonding agent, lowering strength. Strength also depends on maintaining long cellulose molecule chains. The kraft process, due to the alkali and sulphur compounds used, tends to minimize attack on the cellulose and the non-crystalline hemicellulose, which promotes bonding, while dissolving the lignin. Acidic pulping processes shorten the cellulose chains.

Kraft pulp makes superior linerboard and excellent printing and writing papers.

Groundwood, the main ingredient used in newsprint and a principal component of magazine papers (coated publications), is literally ground wood produced by a grinder. Therefore, it contains a lot of lignin, which lowers its strength. The grinding produces very short fibres that drain slowly.

Thermomechanical pulp (TMP) is a variation of groundwood where fibres are separated mechanically while at high enough temperatures to soften the lignin.

Between chemical and mechanical pulps there are semi-chemical pulps that use a mild chemical treatment followed by refining. Semi-chemical pulp is often used for corrugating medium.

Bales of recycled paper (normally old corrugated containers) for unbleached (brown) packaging grades may be simply pulped, screened and cleaned. Recycling to make white papers is usually done in a deinking plant, which employs screening, cleaning, washing, bleaching and flotation. Deinked pulp is used in printing and writing papers and in tissue, napkins and paper towels. It is often blended with virgin pulp.

At integrated pulp and paper mills, pulp is usually stored in high density towers before being pumped to stock preparation. Non integrated mills use either dry pulp or wet lap (pressed) pulp, usually received in bales. The pulp bales are slushed in a [re]pulper.

== Stock (pulp) preparation ==
Stock preparation is the area where pulp is usually refined, blended to the appropriate proportion of hardwood, softwood or recycled fibre, and diluted to as uniform and constant as possible consistency. The pH is controlled and various fillers, such as whitening agents, size and wet strength or dry strength are added if necessary. Additional fillers such as clay, calcium carbonate and titanium dioxide increase opacity so printing on reverse side of a sheet will not distract from content on the obverse side of the sheet. Fillers also improve printing quality.

Pulp is pumped through a sequence of tanks that are commonly called chests, which may be either round or more commonly rectangular. Historically these were made of special ceramic tile faced reinforced concrete, but mild and stainless steels are also used. Because fibre and fillers are denser than water and tend to settle out quickly and also fibres are attracted together to form clumps called floc, low consistency pulp slurries are kept agitated in these chests by propeller like agitators near the pump suction at the chest bottom.

In the following process, different types of pulp, if used, are normally treated in separate but similar process lines until combined at a blend chest:

From high density storage or from slusher/pulper the pulp is pumped to a low density storage chest (tank). From there it is typically diluted to about 4% consistency before being pumped to an unrefined stock chest. From the unrefined stock chest stock is again pumped, with consistency control, through a refiner. Refining is an operation whereby the pulp slurry passes between a pair of discs, one of which is stationary and the other rotating at speeds of typically 1,000 or 1,200 RPM for 50 and 60 Hz AC, respectively. The discs have raised bars on their faces and pass each other with narrow clearance. This action unravels the outer layer of the fibres, causing the fibrils of the fibres to partially detach and bloom outward, increasing the surface area to promoting bonding. Refining thus increases tensile strength. For example, tissue paper is relatively unrefined whereas packaging paper is more highly refined. Refined stock from the refiner then goes to a refined stock chest, or blend chest, if used as such.

Hardwood fibres are typically 1 mm long and smaller in diameter than the 4 mm length typical of softwood fibres. Refining can cause the softwood fibre tube to collapse resulting in undesirable properties in the sheet.

From the refined stock, or blend chest, stock is again consistency controlled as it is being pumped to a machine chest. It may be refined or additives may be added en route to the machine chest.

The machine chest is basically a consistency levelling chest having about 15 minutes retention. This is enough retention time to allow any variations in consistency entering the chest to be levelled out by the action of the basis weight valve receiving feedback from the on line basis weight measuring scanner. (Note: Many paper machines mistakenly control consistency coming out of the machine chest, interfering with basis weight control.) (Note: Results from dynamic material balance sensitivity analysis: The timing for the basis weight control loop is much slower than that of a consistency loop. Also, varying pressure of the consistency control dilution water will introduce swings in consistency if done on the pulp slurry being pumped out. Consistency dilution water should be added to the tank or chest instead, in the zone of the agitator. This can be and should be verified for any particular system using dynamic material balance software. Run model by creating a sharp consistency change ≈½% and observe system stability.)

== Operation ==
There are four main sections on this paper machine. The forming section makes the pulp into the basis for sheets along the wire. The press section, which removes much of the remaining water via a system of nips formed by rolls pressing against each other aided by press felts that support the sheet and absorb the pressed water. The dryer section of the paper machine, as its name suggests, dries the paper by way of a series of internally steam-heated cylinders that evaporate the moisture. Calenders are used to make the paper surface extra smooth and glossy. In practice calender rolls are normally placed vertically in a stack.

Diagram showing the sections of the Fourdrinier machine

=== Forming section or wet end ===
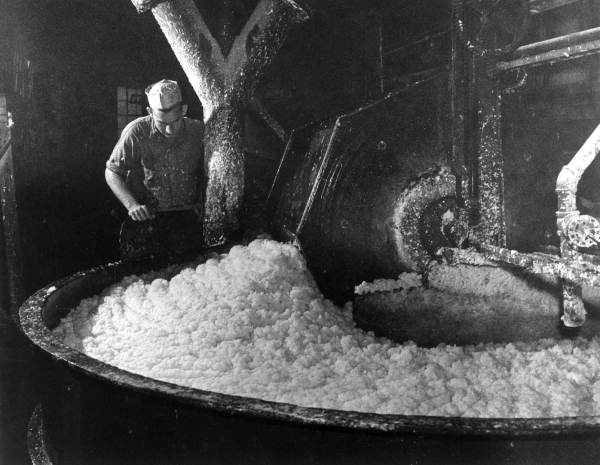
A worker inspecting wet, bleached wood pulp on an old-fashioned Hollander pulper or "beater"

From the machine chest stock is pumped to a head tank, commonly called a "head tank" or stuff box, whose purpose is to maintain a constant head (pressure) on the fiber slurry or stock as it feeds the basis weight valve. The stuff box also provides a means allowing air bubbles to escape. The consistency of the pulp slurry at the stuff box is in the 3% range. Flow from the stuff box is by gravity and is controlled by the basis weight valve on its way to the fan pump suction where it is injected into the main flow of water to the fan pump. The main flow of water pumped by the fan pump is from a whitewater chest or tank that collects all the water drained from the forming section of the paper machine. Before the fiber stream from the stuff box is introduced, the whitewater is very low in fiber content. The whitewater is constantly recirculated by the fan pump through the headbox and recollected from the wire pit and various other tanks and chests that receive drainage from the forming wire and vacuum assisted drainage from suction boxes and wet fiber web handling rolls. On the way to the head box the pulp slurry may pass through centrifugal cleaners, which remove heavy contaminants like sand, and screens, which break up fibre clumps and remove oversized debris. The fan pump ultimately feeds the headbox, whether or not any centrifugal cleaners or screens are present.

The purpose of the headbox is to create turbulence in order to keep the fibers from clumping together and to uniformly distribute the slurry across the width of the wire. Wood fibers have a tendency to attract one another, forming clumps, the effect being called flocculation. Flocculation is lessened by lowering consistency and or by agitating the slurry; however, de-flocculation becomes very difficult at much above 0.5% consistency. Minimizing the degree of flocculation when forming is important to physical properties of paper.

The consistency in the headbox is typically under 0.4% for most paper grades, with longer fibres requiring lower consistency than short fibres. Higher consistency causes more fibres to be oriented in the z direction, while lower consistency promotes fibre orientation in the x-y direction. Higher consistency promotes higher calliper (thickness) and stiffness, lower consistency promotes higher tensile and some other strength properties and also improves formation (uniformity). Many sheet properties continue to improve down to below 0.1% consistency; however, this is an impractical amount of water to handle. (Most paper machine run a higher headbox consistency than optimum because they have been sped up over time without replacing the fan pump and headbox. There is also an economic trade off with high pumping costs for lower consistency).

The stock slurry, often called white water at this point, exits the head box through a rectangular opening of adjustable height called the slice, the white water stream being called the jet and it is pressurized on high speed machines so as to land gently on the moving fabric loop or wire at a speed typically between plus or minus 3% of the wire speed, called rush and drag respectively. Excessive rush or drag causes more orientation of fibres in the machine direction and gives differing physical properties in machine and cross directions; however, this phenomenon is not completely avoidable on Fourdrinier machines.

On lower speed machines at 700 feet per minute, gravity and the height of the stock in the headbox creates sufficient pressure to form the jet through the opening of the slice. The height of the stock is the head, which gives the headbox its name. The speed of the jet compared to the speed of the wire is known as the jet-to-wire ratio. When the jet-to-wire ratio is less than unity, the fibres in the stock become drawn out in the machine direction. On slower machines where sufficient liquid remains in the stock before draining out, the wire can be driven back and forth with a process known as shake. This provides some measure of randomizing the direction of the fibres and gives the sheet more uniform strength in both the machine and cross-machine directions. On fast machines, the stock does not remain on the wire in liquid form long enough and the long fibres line up with the machine. When the jet-to-wire ratio exceeds unity, the fibers tend to pile up in lumps. The resulting variation in paper density provides the antique or parchment paper look.

Two large rolls typically form the ends of the drainage section, which is called the drainage table. The breast roll is located under the flow box, the jet being aimed to land on it at about the top centre. At the other end of the drainage table is the suction (couch) roll. The couch roll is a hollow shell, drilled with many thousands of precisely spaced holes of about 4 to 5 mm diameter. The hollow shell roll rotates over a stationary suction box, normally placed at the top centre or rotated just down machine. Vacuum is pulled on the suction box, which draws water from the web into the suction box. From the suction roll the sheet feeds into the press section.

Down machine from the suction roll, and at a lower elevation, is the wire turning roll. This roll is driven and pulls the wire around the loop. The wire turning roll has a considerable angle of wrap in order to grip the wire.

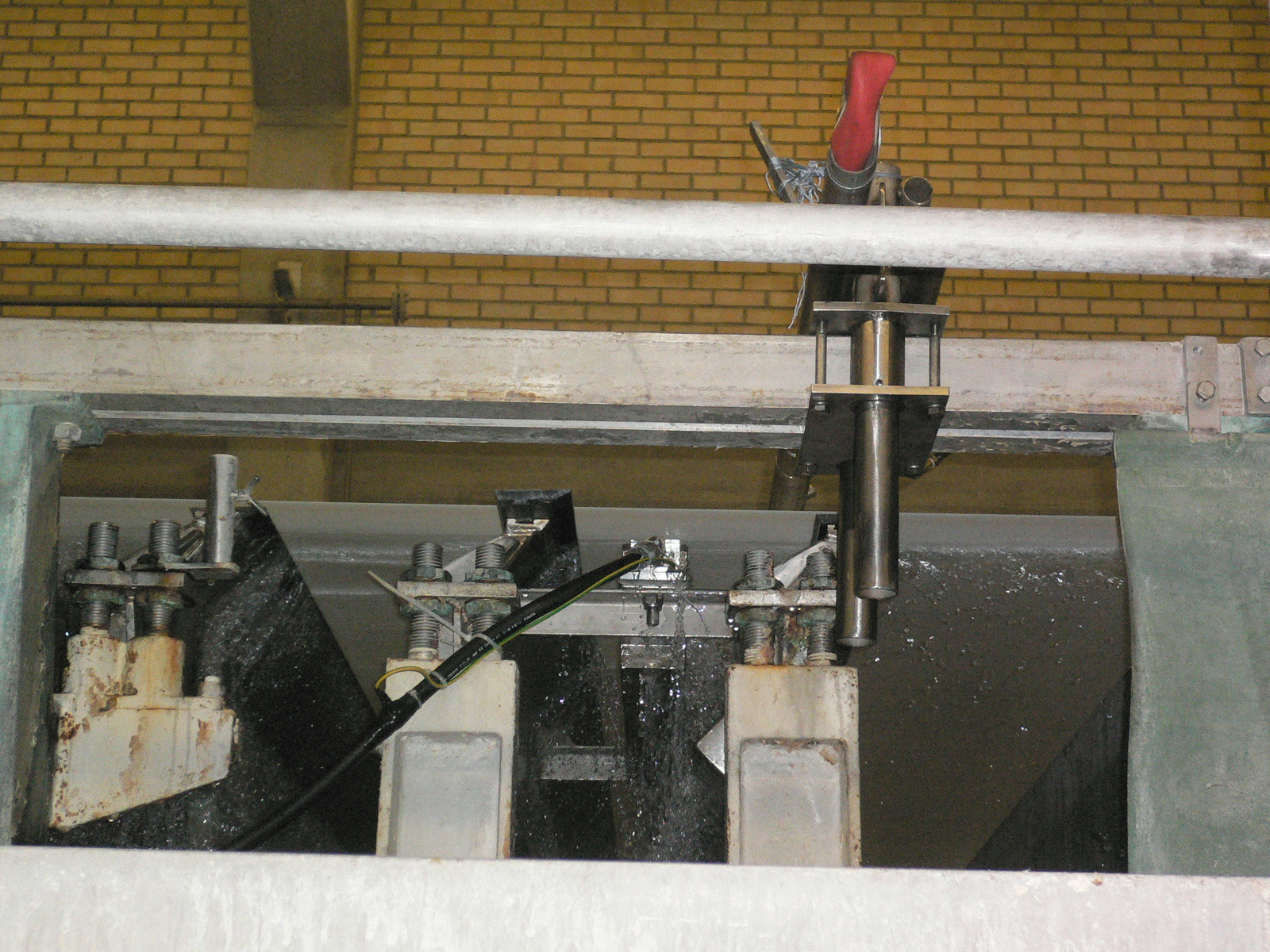
Ultrasonic foil installed under the wire on a paper machine

Supporting the wire in the drainage table area are a number of drainage elements. In addition to supporting the wire and promoting drainage, the elements de-flocculate the sheet. On low speed machines these table elements are primarily table rolls. As speed increases the suction developed in the nip of a table roll increases and at high enough speed the wire snaps back after leaving the vacuum area and causes stock to jump off the wire, disrupting the formation. To prevent this drainage foils are used. The foils are typically sloped between zero and two or three degrees and give a more gentle action. Where rolls and foils are used, rolls are used near the headbox and foils further down machine. Ultrasonic foils can also be used, creating millions of pressure pulses from imploding cavitation bubbles which keep the fibres apart, giving them a more uniform distribution.

Approaching the dry line on the table are located low vacuum boxes that are drained by a barometric leg under gravity pressure. After the dry line are the suction boxes with applied vacuum. Suction boxes extend up to the couch roll. At the couch the sheet consistency should be about 25%.

=== Variations of the Fourdrinier forming section ===
The forming section type is usually based on the grade of paper or paperboard being produced; however, many older machines use a less than optimum design. Older machines can be upgraded to include more appropriate forming sections.

A second headbox may be added to a conventional fourdrinier to put a different fibre blend on top of a base layer. A secondary headbox is normally located at a point where the base sheet is completely drained. This is not considered a separate ply because the water action does a good job of intermixing the fibers of the top and bottom layer. Secondary headboxes are common on linerboard.

A modification to the basic Fourdrinier table by adding a second wire on top of the drainage table is known as a top wire former. The bottom and top wires converge and some drainage is up through the top wire. A top wire improves formation and also gives more drainage, which is useful for machines that have been sped up.

The Twin Wire Machine or Gap former uses two vertical wires in the forming section, thereby increasing the de-watering rate of the fibre slurry while also giving uniform two sidedness.

There are also machines with entire Fourdrinier sections mounted above a traditional Fourdrinier. This allows making multi-layer paper with special characteristics. These are called top Fourdriniers and they make multi-ply paper or paperboard. Commonly this is used for making a top layer of bleached fibre to go over an unbleached layer.

Another type forming section is the cylinder mould machine invented by John Dickinson in 1809, originally as a competitor to the Fourdrinier machine. This machine uses a mesh-covered rotating cylinder partially immersed in a tank of fibre slurry in the wet end to form a paper web, giving a more random distribution of the cellulose fibres. Cylinder machines can form a sheet at higher consistency, which gives a more three dimensional fibre orientation than lower consistencies, resulting in higher caliper (thickness) and more stiffness in the machine direction (MD). High MD stiffness is useful in food packaging like cereal boxes and other boxes like dry laundry detergent.

Tissue machines typically form the paper web between a wire and a special fabric (felt) as they wrap around a forming roll. The web is pressed from the felt directly onto a large diameter dryer called a yankee. The paper sticks to the yankee dryer and is peeled off with a scraping blade called a doctor. Tissue machines operate at speeds of up to 2000 m/min.

=== Press section ===
Paper machine

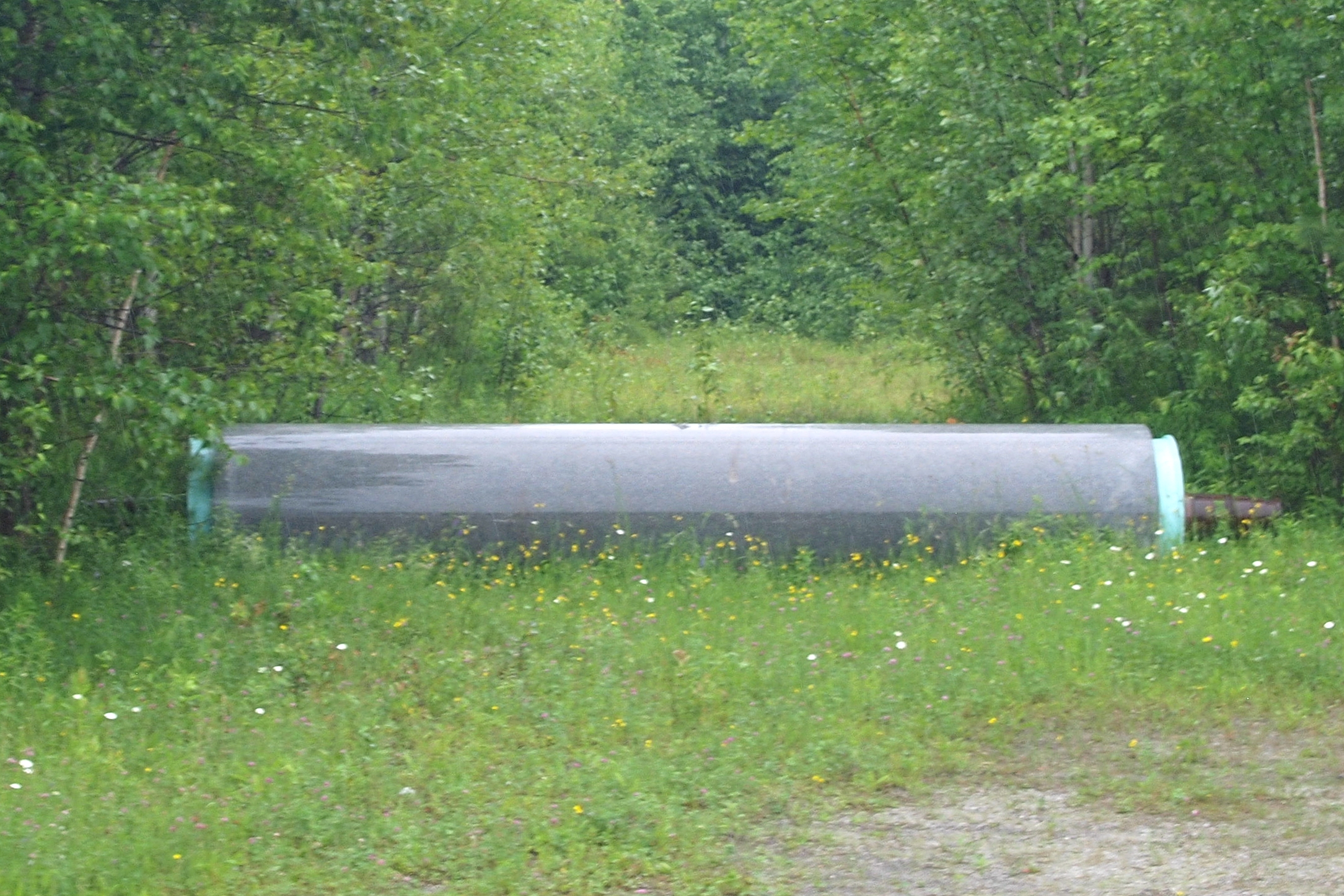
Granite press roll at a granite quarry site

The second section of the paper machine is the press section, which removes much of the remaining water via a system of nips formed by rolls pressing against each other aided by press felts that support the sheet and absorb the pressed water. The paper web consistency leaving the press section can be above 40%. Pressing is the second most efficient method of de-watering the sheet (behind free drainage in the forming section) as only mechanical action is required.

The number of press rolls, their arrangement and the arrangement and type of felts used are influenced by the grades of paper being produced and the desired operational characteristics of the machine.

Press felts historically were made from wool. However, today they are nearly 100% synthetic. They are made up of a polyamide woven fabric with thick batt applied in a specific design to maximise water absorption.

Presses can be single or double felted. A single felted press has a felt on one side and a smooth roll on the other. A double felted press has both sides of the sheet in contact with a press felt. Single felted nips are useful when mated against a smooth roll (usually in the top position), which adds a two-sidedness—making the top side appear smoother than the bottom. Double felted nips impart roughness on both sides of the sheet. Double felted presses are desirable for the first press section of heavy paperboard.

Simple press rolls can be rolls with grooved or blind drilled surface. More advanced press rolls are suction rolls. These are rolls with perforated shell and cover. The shell made of metal material such as bronze or stainless steel is covered with rubber or a synthetic material. Both shell and cover are drilled throughout the surface. A stationary suction box is fitted in the core of the suction roll to support the shell being pressed. End face mechanical seals are used for the interface between the inside surface of the shell and the suction box. For the smooth rolls, they are typically made of granite rolls. The granite rolls can be up to 30-foot (9.1 m) long and 6 feet (1.8 m) in diameter.

Conventional roll presses are configured with one of the press rolls is in a fixed position, with a mating roll being loaded against this fixed roll. The felts run through the nips of the press rolls and continues around a felt run, normally consisting of several felt rolls. During the dwell time in the nip, the moisture from the sheet is transferred to the press felt. When the press felt exits the nip and continues around, a vacuum box known as an Uhle Box applies vacuum (normally -60 kPa) to the press felt to remove the moisture so that when the felt returns to the nip on the next cycle, it does not add moisture to the sheet.

Some grades of paper use suction pick up rolls that use vacuum to transfer the sheet from the couch to a lead in felt on the first press or between press sections. Pickup roll presses normally have a vacuum box that has two vacuum zones (low vacuum and high vacuum). These rolls have a large number of drilled holes in the cover to allow the vacuum to pass from the stationary vacuum box through the rotating roll covering. The low vacuum zone picks up the sheet and transfers, while the high vacuum zone attempts to remove moisture. Unfortunately, at high enough speed centrifugal force flings out vacuumed water, making this less effective for dewatering. Pickup presses also have standard felt runs with Uhle boxes. However, pickup press design is quite different, as air movement is important for the pickup and dewatering facets of its role.

Crown Controlled Rolls (also known as CC Rolls) are usually the mating roll in a press arrangement. They have hydraulic cylinders in the press rolls that ensure that the roll does not bow. The cylinders connect to a shoe or multiple shoes to keep the crown on the roll flat, to counteract the natural "bend" in the roll shape due to applying load to the edges.

Extended Nip Presses (or ENP) are a relatively modern alternative to conventional roll presses. The top roll is usually a standard roll, while the bottom roll is actually a large CC roll with an extended shoe curved to the shape of the top roll, surrounded by a rotating rubber belt rather than a standard roll cover. The goal of the ENP is to extend the dwell time of the sheet between the two rolls thereby maximising the de-watering. Compared to a standard roll press that achieves up to 35% solids after pressing, an ENP brings this up to 45% and higher—delivering significant steam savings or speed increases. ENPs densify the sheet, thus increasing tensile strength and some other physical properties.

=== Dryer section ===
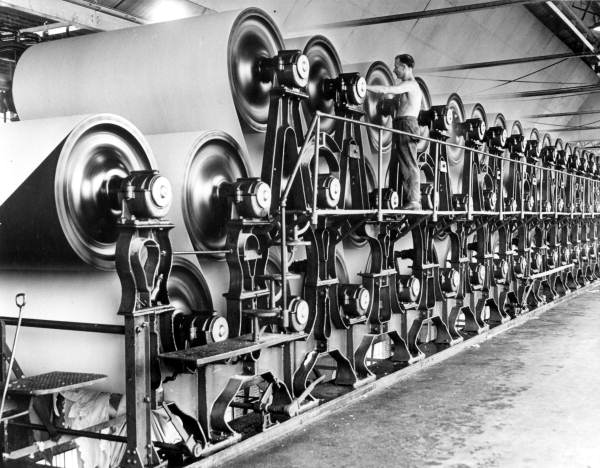
Dryer section of an older Fourdrinier-style paper-making machine. These narrow, small diameter dryers are not enclosed by a hood, dating the photo to before the 1970s.

The dryer section of the paper machine, as its name suggests, dries the paper by way of a series of internally steam-heated cylinders that evaporate the moisture. Steam pressures may range up to 160 psig. Steam enters the end of the dryer head (cylinder cap) through a steam joint and condensate exits through a siphon that goes from the internal shell to a centre pipe. From the centre pipe the condensate exits through a joint on the dryer head. Wide machines require multiple siphons. In faster machines, centrifugal force holds the condensate layer still against the shell and turbulence generating bars are typically used to agitate the condensate layer and improve heat transfer.

The sheet is usually held against the dryers by long felt loops on the top and bottom of each dryer section. The felts greatly improve heat transfer. Dryer felts are made of coarse thread and have a very open weave that is almost see through, It is common to have the first bottom dryer section unfelted to dump broke on the basement floor during sheet breaks or when threading the sheet.

Paper dryers are typically arranged in groups called sections so that they can be run at a progressively slightly slower speed to compensate for sheet shrinkage as the paper dries. Some grades of paper may also stretch as they run through the machine, requiring increasing speed between sections. The gaps between sections are called draws.

The drying sections are usually enclosed to conserve heat. Heated air is usually supplied to the pockets where the sheet breaks contact with the driers. This increases the rate of drying. The pocket ventilating tubes have slots along their entire length that face into the pocket. The dryer hoods are usually exhausted with a series of roof mounted hood exhausts fans down the dryer section.

=== Size Press ===
Additional sizing agents, including resins, glue, or starch, can be added to the web to alter its characteristics. Sizing improves the paper's water resistance, decreases its ability to fuzz, reduces abrasiveness, and improves its printing properties and surface bond strength. These may be applied at the wet (internal sizing) or on the dry end (surface sizing), or both. At the dry end sizing is usually applied with a size press. The size press may be a roll applicator (flooded nip) or Nozzle applicator . It is usually placed before the last dryer section. Some paper machines also make use of a 'coater' to apply a coating of fillers such as calcium carbonate or china clay usually suspended in a binder of cooked starch and styrene-butadiene latex. Coating produces a very smooth, bright surface with the highest printing qualities.

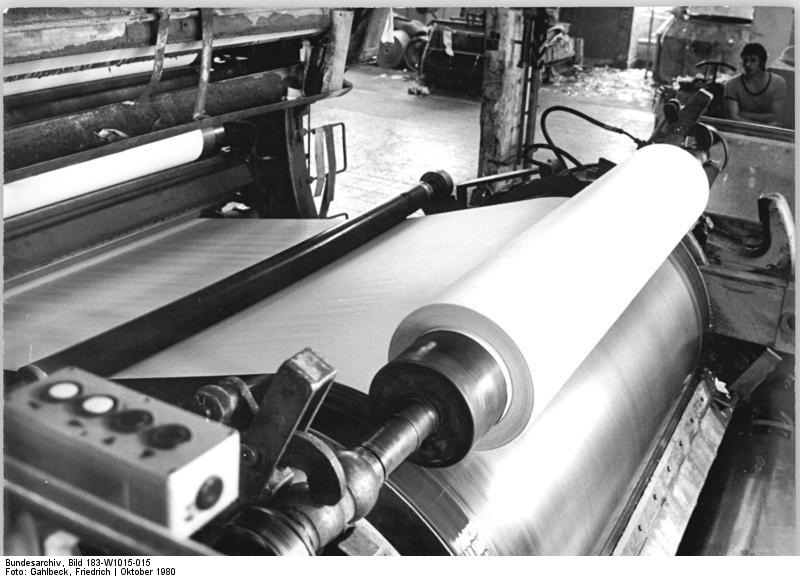
Paper leaving the machine is rolled onto a reel for further processing.

=== Calender section ===
A calender consists of two or more rolls, where pressure is applied to the passing paper. Calenders are used to make the paper surface extra smooth and glossy. It also gives it a more uniform thickness. The pressure applied to the web by the rollers determines the finish of the paper.

=== Reel section ===
After calendering, the web has a moisture content of about 6% (depending on the furnish). The paper is wound onto metal spools using a large cylinder called a reel drum. Constant nip pressure is maintained between the reel drum and the spool, allowing the resulting friction to spin the spool. Paper runs over the top of the reel drum and is wound onto the spool to create a master roll.

To be able to keep the paper machine running continuously, the reel must be able to quickly switch from winding a finished roll to an empty spool without stopping the flow of paper. To accomplish this, each reel section will have two or more spools rotating through the process. Using an overhead crane, empty spools will be loaded onto two primary arms above the reel drum. When the master roll reaches its maximum diameter, the arms will lower the new spool into contact with the reel drum and a machine behind the drum will run a tape along the moving sheet of paper, swiftly tearing it and attaching incoming paper onto the new spool. The spool is then lowered onto the secondary arms, which steadily guide the spool away from the reel drum as the diameter of paper on the spool increases.

The roll hardness should be checked, obtained and adjusted accordingly to insure that the roll hardness is within the acceptable range for the product.

Before winding or further converting, some production lines include additional steps to reduce surface contamination of the web, for example through air extraction or web cleaning systems.

=== Winder section ===
Reels of paper wound up at the end of the drying process are the full trimmed width, minus shrinkage from drying, of the web leaving the wire. In the winder section reels of paper are slit into smaller rolls of a width and roll diameter range specified by a customer order. To accomplish this the reel is placed on an unwind stand and the distances between the slitters (sharp cutting wheels), are adjusted to the specified widths for the orders. The winder is run until the desired roll diameter is reached and the rolls are labeled according to size and order before being sent to shipping or the warehouse. A reel usually has sufficient diameter to make two or more sets of rolls.

== Glossary ==
broke: waste paper made during the paper making process, either made during a sheet break or trimmings. It is gathered up and put in a repulper for recycling back into the process.

consistency: the percent dry fiber in a pulp slurry.

couch: French meaning to lie down. Following the couch roll the sheet is lifted off the wire and transferred into the press section.

dandy roll: a mesh covered hollow roll that rides on top of the Fourdrinier. It breaks up fiber clumps to improve the sheet formation and can also be used to make an imprint, as with laid paper. See also watermark.

fan pump: the large pump that circulates white water from the white water chest to the headbox. The pump is a special low pulse design that minimizes the effect of vane pulses which would cause uneven basis weight of paper in the machine direction known as barring. The flow from the fan pump may go through screens and cleaners, if used. On large paper machines fan pumps may be rated in tens of thousands of gallons per minute.

felt: a loop of fabric or synthetic material that goes between press rolls and serves as a place to receive the pressed out water. Felts also support the wet paper web and guide it through the press section. Felts are also used in the dryer section to keep the sheet in close contact with the dryers and increase heat transfer.

filler: a finely divided substance added to paper in the forming process. Fillers improve print quality, brightness and opacity. The most common fillers are clay and calcium carbonate. Titanium dioxide is a filler but also improves brightness and opacity. Use of calcium carbonate filler is the commonly used in alkaline papermaking, while kaolin clay is prevalent in acidic papermaking. Alkaline paper has superior ageing properties.

formation: the degree of uniformity of fiber distribution in finished paper, which is easily seen by holding paper up to the light.

headbox: the pressure chamber where turbulence is applied to break up fiber clumps in the slurry. The main job of the headbox is to distribute the fiber slurry uniformly across the wire.

nip: the contact area where two opposing rolls meet, such as in a press or calender.

pH: the degree of acidity or alkalinity of a solution. Alkaline paper has a very long life. Acid paper deteriorates over time, which caused libraries to either take conservation measures or replace many older books.

size: a chemical or starch, applied to paper to retard the rate of water penetration. Sizing prevents bleeding of ink during printing, improving the sharpness of printing.

slice: the adjustable rectangular orifice, usually at the bottom of the headbox, through which the whitewater jet discharges onto the wire. The slice opening and water pressure together determine the amount and velocity of whitewater flow through the slice. The slice usually has some form of adjustment mechanism to even out the paper weight profile across the machine (CD profile), although a newer method is to inject water into the whitewater across the headbox slice area, thereby using localized consistency to control CD weight profile.

stock: a pulp slurry that has been processed in the stock preparation area with necessary additives, refining and pH adjustment and ready for making paper

web: the continuous flow of un-dried fiber from the couch roll down the paper machine

white water: filtrate from the drainage table. The white water from the table is usually stored in a white water chest from which it is pumped by the fan pump to the headbox.

wire: the woven mesh fabric loop that is used for draining the pulp slurry from the headbox. Until the 1970s bronze wires were used but now they are woven from coarse mono-filament synthetics similar to fishing line but very stiff.

== Materials ==
Stainless steels are used extensively in the pulp and paper industry for two primary reasons, to avoid iron contamination of the product and their corrosion resistance to the various chemicals used in the paper making process. Type 316 stainless steel is a common material used in paper machines.

== See also ==
- Paper chemicals
- Continuous production
- Cutting stock problem
- Quality control system for paper, board and tissue machines
