= Henry Fourdrinier =

English paper-making entrepreneur (1766–1854)

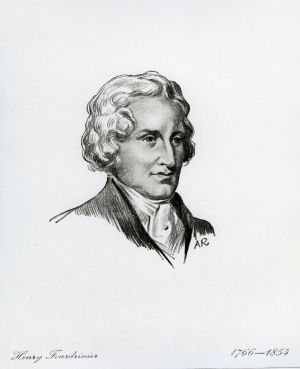
Henry Fourdrinier

Henry Fourdrinier (11 February 1766 – 3 September 1854) was a British paper-making entrepreneur.

He was born in 1766, the son of paper maker and stationer Henry Fourdrinier, and grandson of the engraver Paul Fourdrinier, 1698–1758, sometimes mistakenly called Pierre Fourdrinier. With his brother, Sealy, he commissioned the development of the Fourdrinier machine, a papermaking machine that produced continuous rolls of paper. The machine is an industrialised version of the historical hand paper-making method, which could not satisfy the demands of developing modern society for large quantities of printing and writing materials.

A patent was granted on 24 July 1806, for a machine that could make a long continuous web of paper and was based on the machine developed by Frenchman Louis-Nicolas Robert. This had the dual advantage of considerably higher productivity plus production in roll form, for applications such as wallpaper printing. The range of cut paper sizes was also extended as it was not limited by the frame or deckle size of hand made paper.

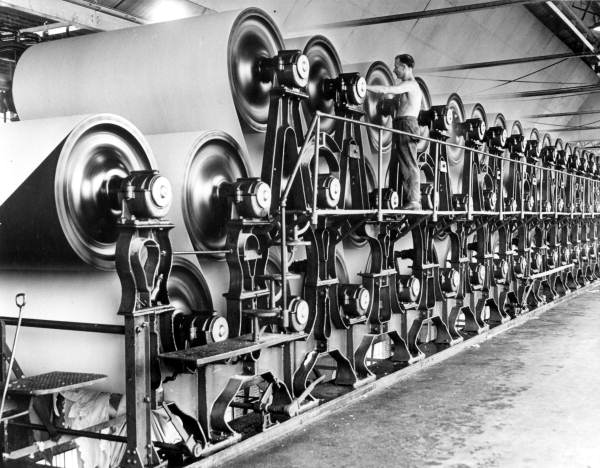
Large Fourdrinier-style paper-making machine. A row of heated drums dry out the paper, which enters the machine as wet pulp. Large rolls are usually sliced into a number of thin rolls, which can feed continuous presses (e.g. newspapers) or be cut into separate sheets.

The invention cost £60000, and caused the brothers to go bankrupt. Due to various laws, it was difficult to protect the patent on the machine, and the new system was widely adopted but with no benefit to the inventors.

In 1814, two machines were made in Peterhof, Russia, by order of the Russian emperor on the condition £700 would be paid to Fourdrinier every year for ten years — but, despite petitioning Tsar Nicholas, no money was ever paid. In 1839, a petition was brought before parliament, and in 1840, £7000 was paid to Fourdrinier and his family.

Fourdrinier died in 1854, at the age of 88.

His sister, Jemima, was the mother of the theologian John Henry Newman.
