= At the Seashore =

1886 painting by Anna Bilińska

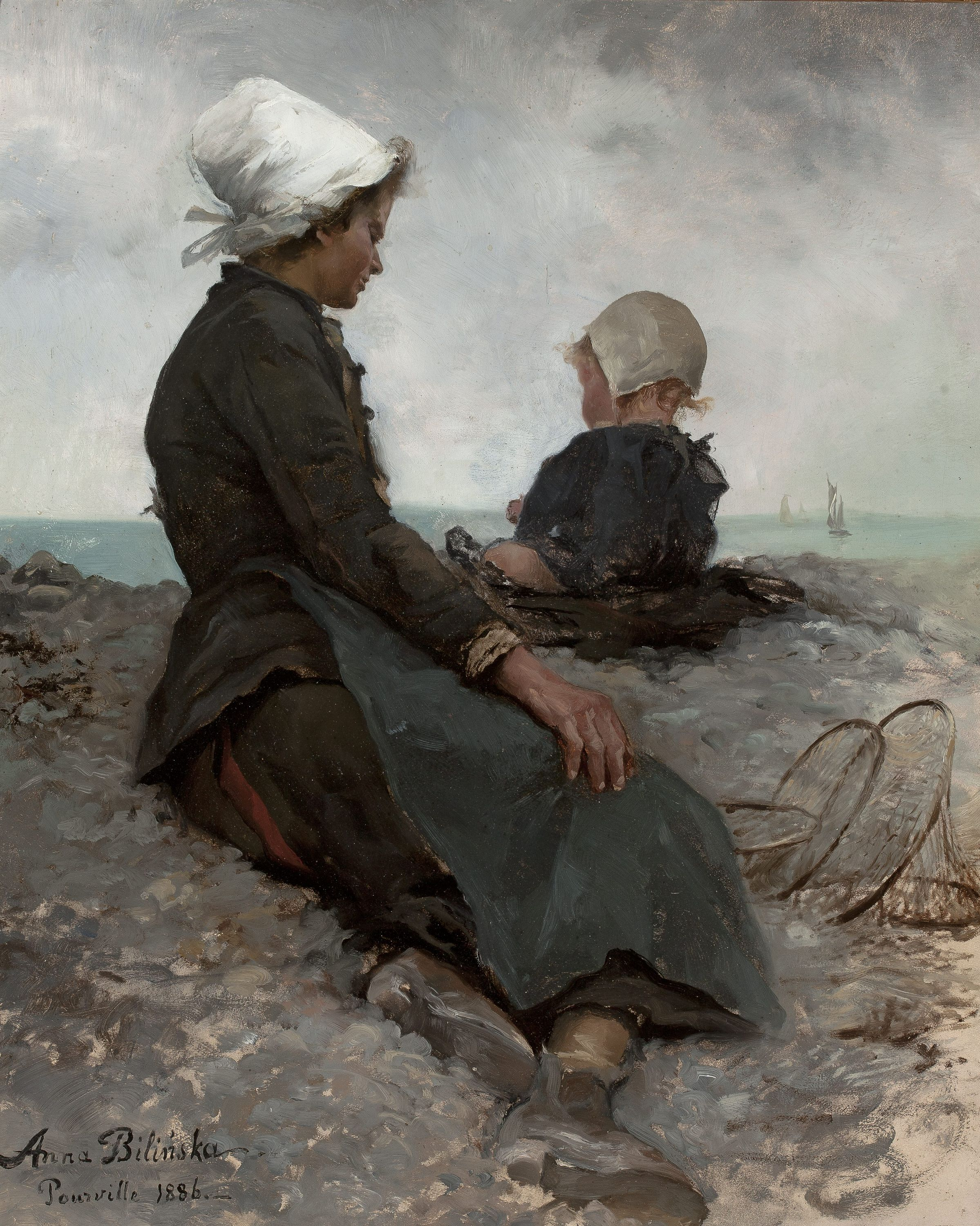
- Artist: Anna Bilińska
- Year: 1886
- Medium: Oil-on-cardboard
- Dimensions: 60 cm × 50 cm (23.6 in × 19.6 in)
- Location: National Museum; Warsaw

At the Seashore (Polish: Nad brzegiem morza) is an 1886 oil painting by Polish painter Anna Bilińska. It is displayed at the National Museum in Warsaw, Poland.

== Description ==
The painting shows a young woman from a fishing village who sits on the sand with her little daughter. A hoop net lies next to the woman on the right. Sailing boats are visible on a calm sea in the distance. The painting is dominated by tones of grey colour.

== Analysis ==
Between 1885 and 1886, Bilińska used to leave Paris and spend her summer holiday in Pourville, Normandy. In this period, the artist experienced a nervous breakdown resulting from the recent death of her father and a close friend – Klementyna Krassowska. At the Seashore is regarded as one of the best and most well-known works in the artist's oeuvre. The painting depicts a realistic scene from a beach located by the English Channel and conveys a profound sense of melancholy. The artist captured not only the gloomy atmosphere and the vastness of the seaside landscape but also the complex nature of motherhood. The figures of the mother and her child, portrayed from behind, are separated by the expanse of the sea, which is often interpreted as a sign of mourning after the loss of a child.

== See also ==
- A Negress
- List of Polish painters
