= Anna Bilińska =

Polish artist (1854–1893)

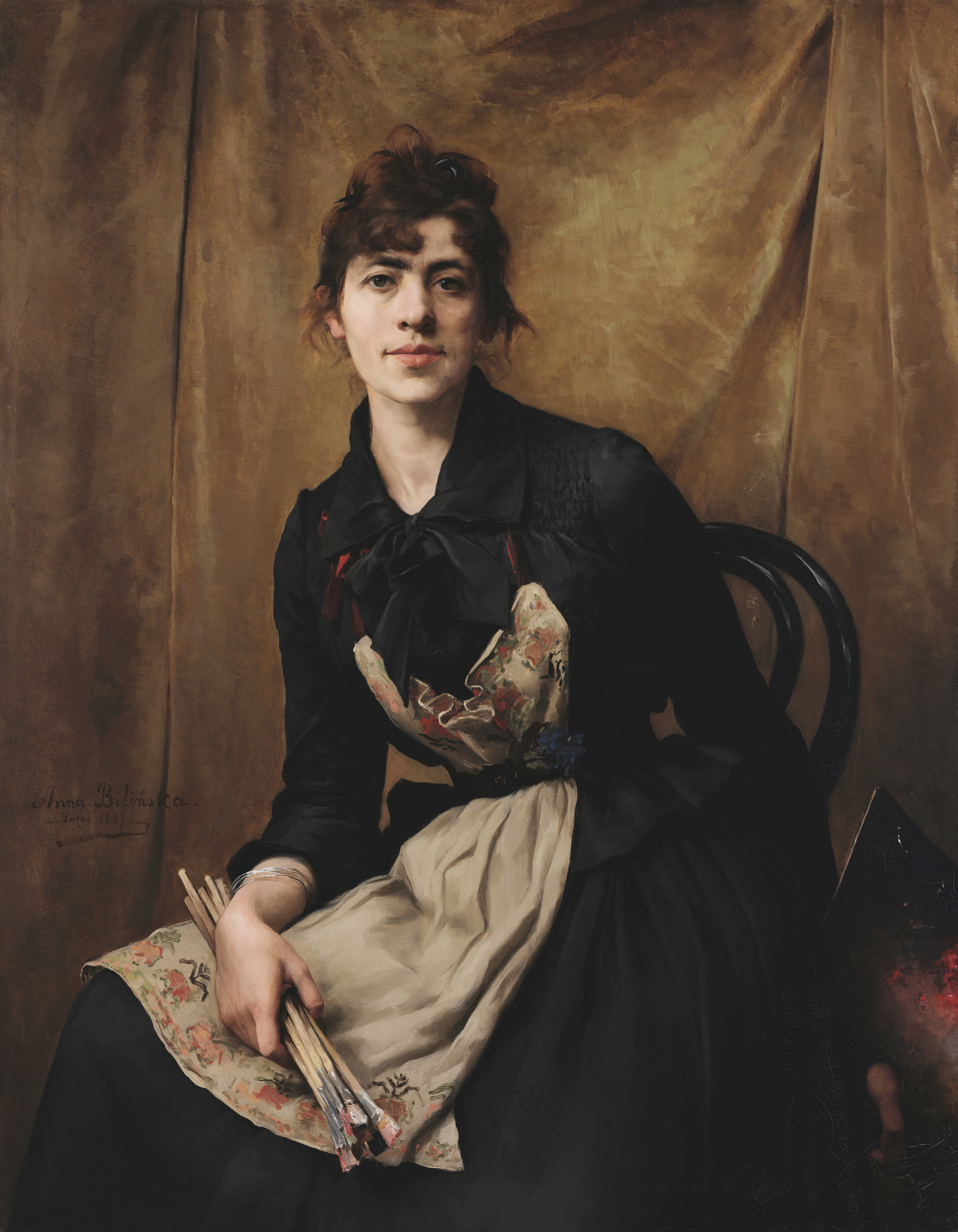
- Self-Portrait with Apron and Brushes, 1887
- Born: 8 December 1854; Zlatopol, Kherson Governorate, Russian Empire
- Died: 8 April 1893 (aged 38); Warsaw, Congress Poland
- Known for: Painting
- Notable work: A Negress (1884); At the Seashore (1886)
- Movement: Realism
- Spouse: Antoni Bohdanowicz

Anna Bilińska (pronounced: [ˈanna biˈliɲska] also known as Anna Bilińska-Bohdanowicz; 8 December 1854 – 8 April 1893) was a Polish painter, known for her portraits. A representative of realism, she spent a decade of her life in Paris, and is considered the "first internationally known Polish woman artist."

== Life ==
=== Early years ===
She was born 1854 in Zlatopol (formerly a frontier town of the Russian Empire, today a part of Novomyrhorod, Ukraine) as Anna Bilińska, and spent her childhood there with her father, a Polish physician. Of her background, she joked that she "ha[d] a Cossack's temperament, but a Polish heart" (Polish: ma temperament kozaczy, ale serce polskie). The family then moved to Central Russia, where Anna's first art teachers were Ignacy Jasiński and Michał Elwiro Andriolli, both deported by the Tsarist government to Vyatka for their part in the January Uprising of 1863–1864.

In 1875, Bilińska's mother moved the family to Warsaw, enrolling her of-age children in the conservatoire. Anna was a talented pianist, an activity considered a suitable achievement for a woman of her class and time. But painting, a more suspect pursuit, would become her preference.

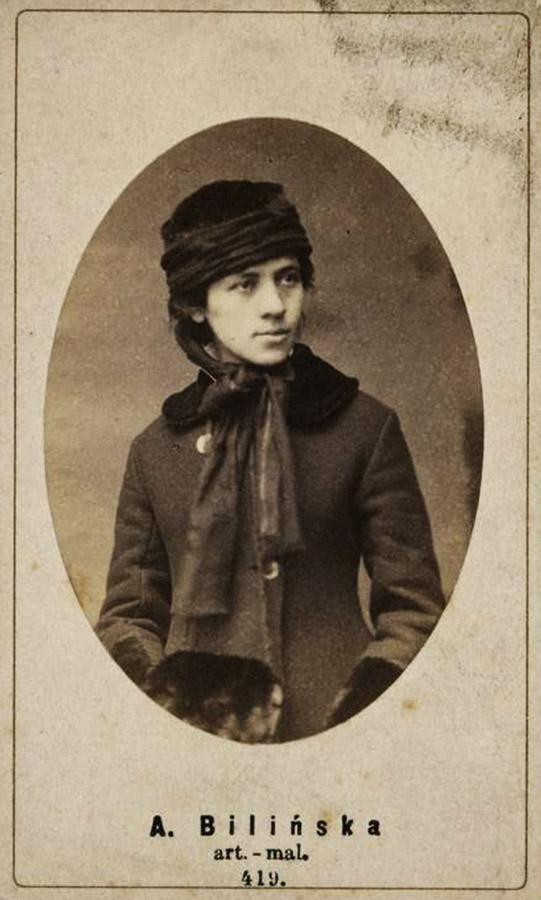
Photograph of Bilińska aged 18, by Wojciech Piechowski, National Museum in Kraków

In 1877, she became a student of the painter Wojciech Gerson and began to exhibit her work at Warsaw's Zachęta Society for the Promotion of Fine Arts (Polish: Towarzystwo Zachęty Sztuk Pięknych). Against her parents' wishes, she hired her own studio at 2 Nowy Świat Street, selling her paintings and paying the studio's rent from her own funds.

=== Europe: travels to Austria, Italy & Paris ===
In early 1882, she accompanied her chronically ill friend Klementyna Krassowska on a journey to Munich, Salzburg, Vienna and northern Italy, before traveling to and settling in Paris, where she studied along with Marie Bashkirtseff and English artist Emmeline Deane at the Académie Julian, and where later she also taught. In 1884, her father, Jan Biliński, and Krassowska died, leaving her emotionally devastated. However, her future was financially secured in Krassowska's last will and she was taken care of by fellow painter Maria Gażycz who lived in Normandy.

In 1889, she presented her Self-Portrait at the Exposition Universelle in Paris for which she was awarded a silver medal and was granted the right to exhibit her works out of competition during future editions of the event. This proved to be her first major international success. In 1889, her works were exhibited at the Royal Academy of Art in London. In 1891, they were displayed at an annual international exhibition in Berlin where she was awarded a gold medal.

She lived in France until 1892, when she married Antoni Bohdanowicz, a doctor of medicine, and took his name. After their marriage, they returned to Warsaw, where she intended to open a Parisian-style art school for women, but fell ill with a heart condition and died a year later on 8 April 1893. She was interred at Warsaw's Powązki Cemetery.

== Works ==
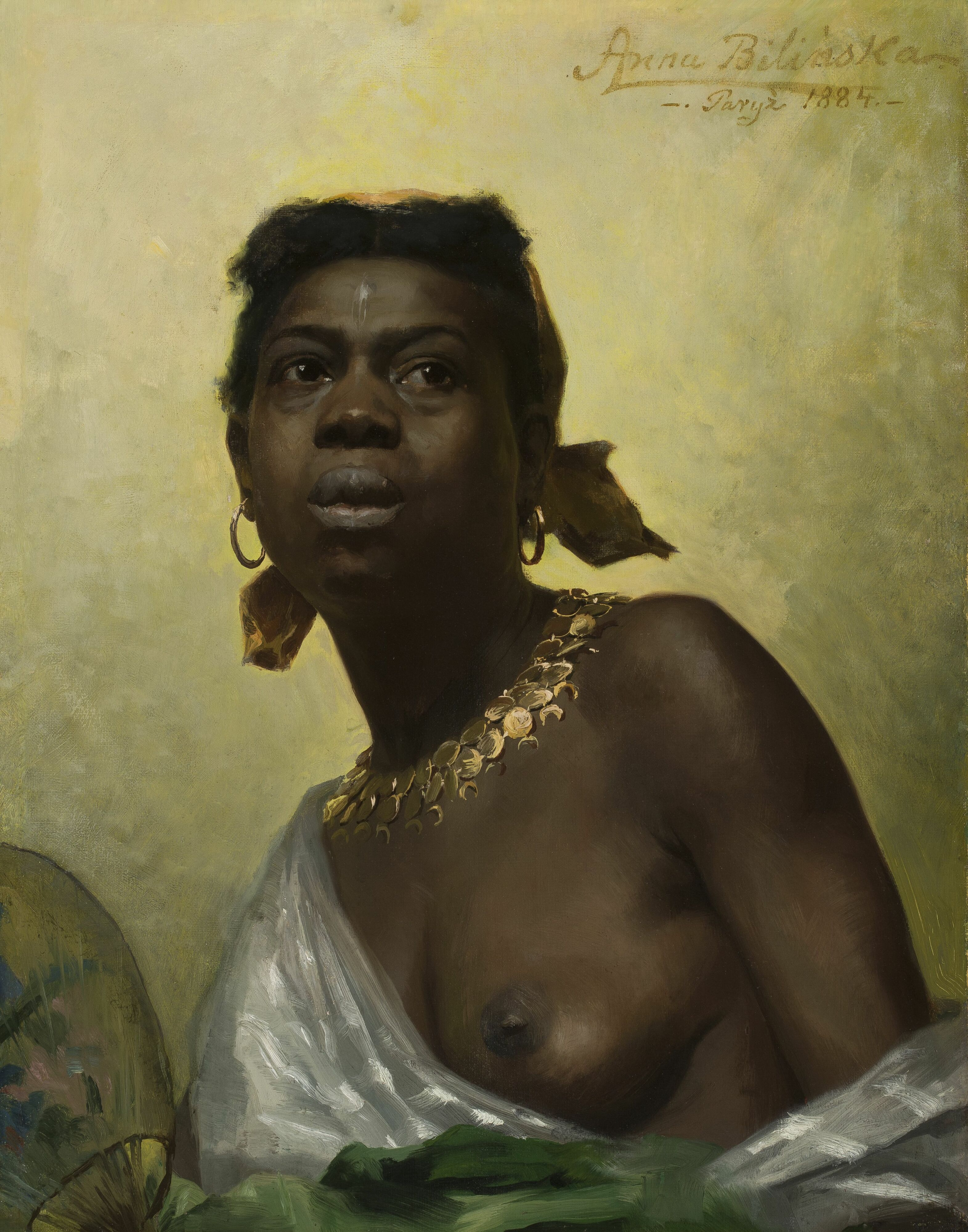
Anna Bilińska, Murzynka - A Negress (1884) NMW. Logged in Poland's official directory of cultural heritage looted during WWII, recovered in 2012.

Anna Bilińska is best known for her portraits, especially those featuring women, painted with great intuition. Her Self-Portrait with Apron and Brushes (1887) developed a new self-portrait pose by placing the artist in front of a model's backdrop, thus stating that she is her own model. Her portrait titled By the Window (1890), painted using the pastel technique, was regarded by 19th-century critics as Bilińska's most modern painting considering its subject matter, framing, and the use of light. It depicts a young girl leaning out of a window towards a sunlit garden and was probably painted during the artist's summer holiday spent in the fishing village of Boyardville. Among her notable male portraits is the portrait of American sculptor George Grey Barnard painted in 1890 at the request of Alfred Corning Clark. She also painted still lifes, genre scenes, and landscapes using oil, watercolors, and sometimes pastels.

Two of Bilińska's paintings went missing after World War II: A Negress (1884) and The Italian Woman (1880). The former was rediscovered at an auction in Germany in 2011 and successfully reclaimed in 2012 thanks to the efforts of the Ministry of Culture and National Heritage of Poland. It is currently displayed at the National Museum in Warsaw.

Her paintings can be found in the National Museum in Warsaw, National Museum in Wrocław, National Museum in Kraków, Victoria Art Gallery in Bath, Musée d'art moderne in Saint-Étienne, Lviv National Art Gallery, Gothenburg Museum of Art, State Museum of Pennsylvania, and the Berlin Musical Instrument Museum, as well as in private collections.

== Legacy ==
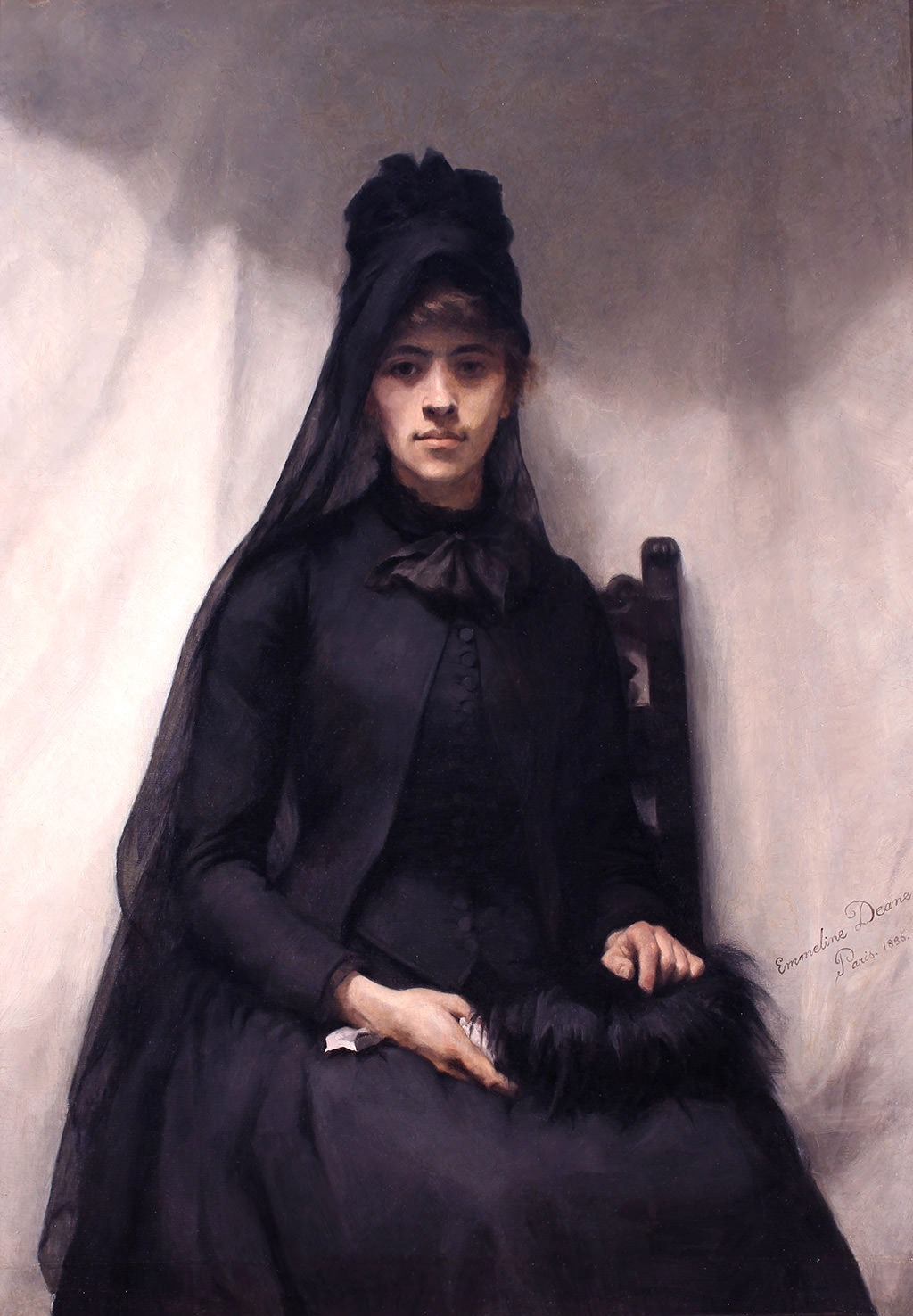
Emmeline Deane, Portrait of the artist Anna Bilińska-Bohdanowicz (1886) Victoria Art Gallery, Bath, UK

Bilińska is considered the first female Polish artist to receive a professional artistic education at an academic level and to earn critical acclaim abroad. She was included in the 2018 American Federation of Arts' exhibition Women Artists in Paris, 1850–1900.

Shortly after Bilińska's father died in 1882, Bilińska's portrait, depicting the artist in deep mourning, was painted by her friend, Emmeline Deane, in Paris. This painting (now in the Victoria Art Gallery) evoked such emotional intensity of loss that, when exhibited in Paris and London, it "caused such a stir that it featured in a cartoon in Punch magazine." The work is considered to be significant because it was not common, at that time, for women painters to create formal salon-style portraits of other women painters, let alone to exhibit them.

Bilińska's work was not well known through the 20th century, even in her home country. Some credit the "prejudices of the time and her own early death and short career" for this lack of recognition, but, if so, it was a fate she held in common with numerous other gifted women painters of the 19th century. In 2017, thirty-seven of these "forgotten female artists" were featured in the traveling exhibition, Women Artists in Paris, 1850–1900. The show codified the works of numerous 19th century women artists whose paintings had begun to be increasingly appreciated. The show was criticized for failing to fully explore why these artists "continue to be underestimated."

In 2021 the National Museum in Warsaw held a major retrospective of Bilińska work, displaying over 120 paintings (including Deane's 1886 portrait). The exhibition's biographical notes provided a timely assessment of her work, proclaiming that Bilińska's paintings had become "part of the canon of Polish art," while simultaneously reflecting that the scholarship on her "entire œuvre and life story" remained, as yet, incomplete. The exhibition reviewers' consensus appeared to be that the show was finally bringing Bilińska the "recognition she deserves," and at the same time advancing further questions about her art and life.

== Exhibitions ==
=== Posthumous ===
- Artystka, Anna Bilińska 1854–1893; (26 Jun – 10 Oct 2021) National Museum in Warsaw, Poland. Solo retrospective.
- Women Artists in Paris, 1850–1900; (22 Oct 2017 – 15 Jan 2018) Denver Art Museum, Colorado (17 Feb – 13 May 2018); Speed Art Museum in Louisville, Kentucky; and (9 Jun – 3 Sep 2018) at the Clark Art Institute, Williamstown, MA.

== Gallery ==
=== Selected paintings ===
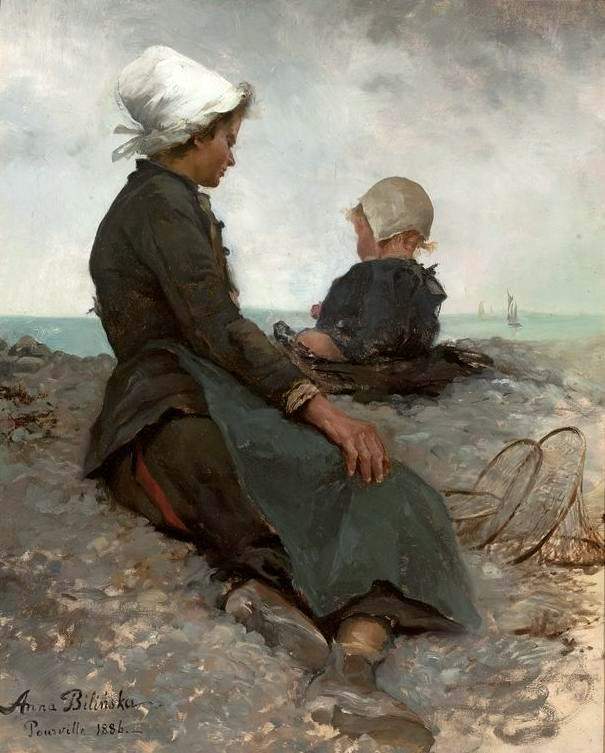
At the Seashore (1886), National Museum in Warsaw

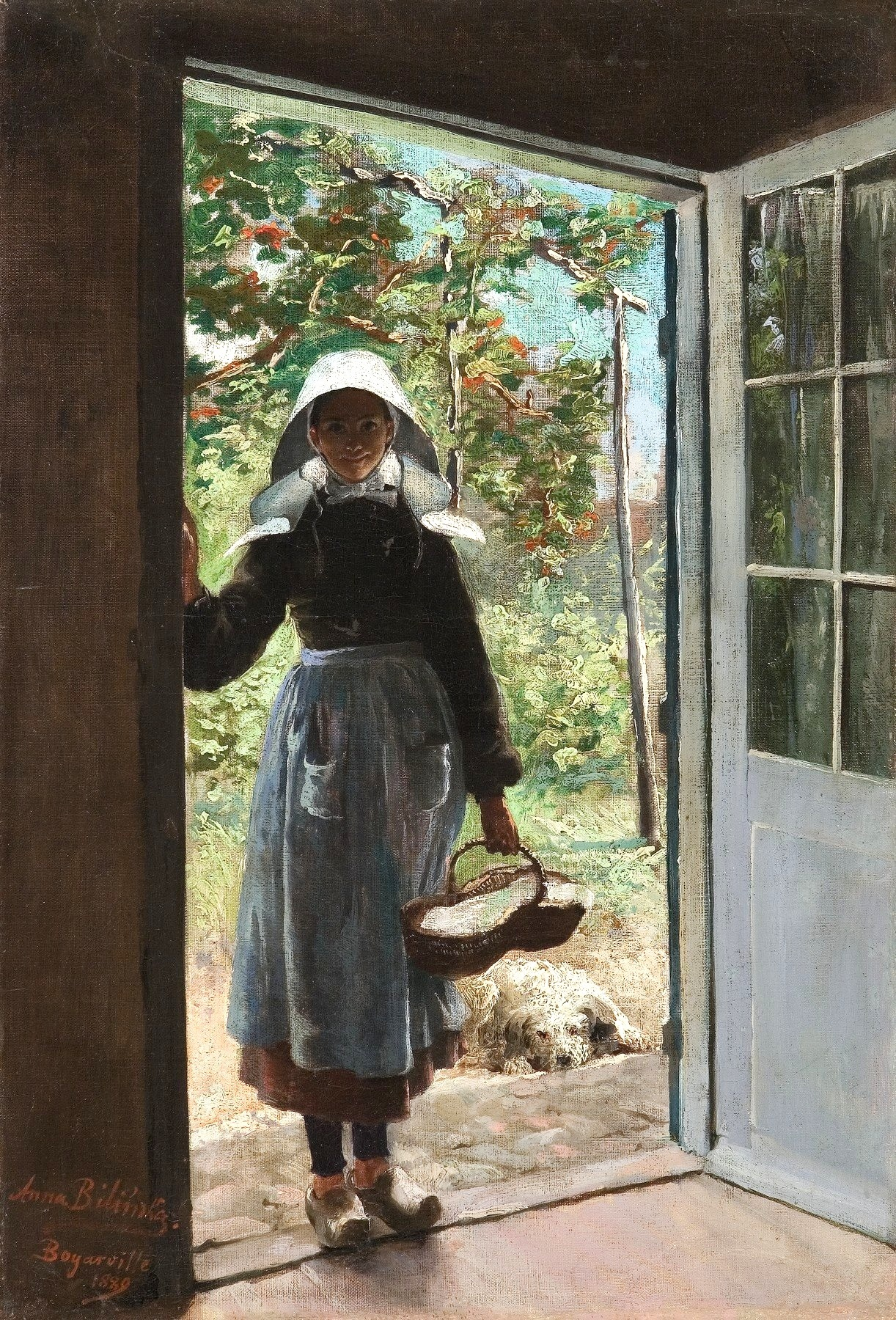
Breton Woman Standing on a Doorstep, 1889, National Museum in Wrocław

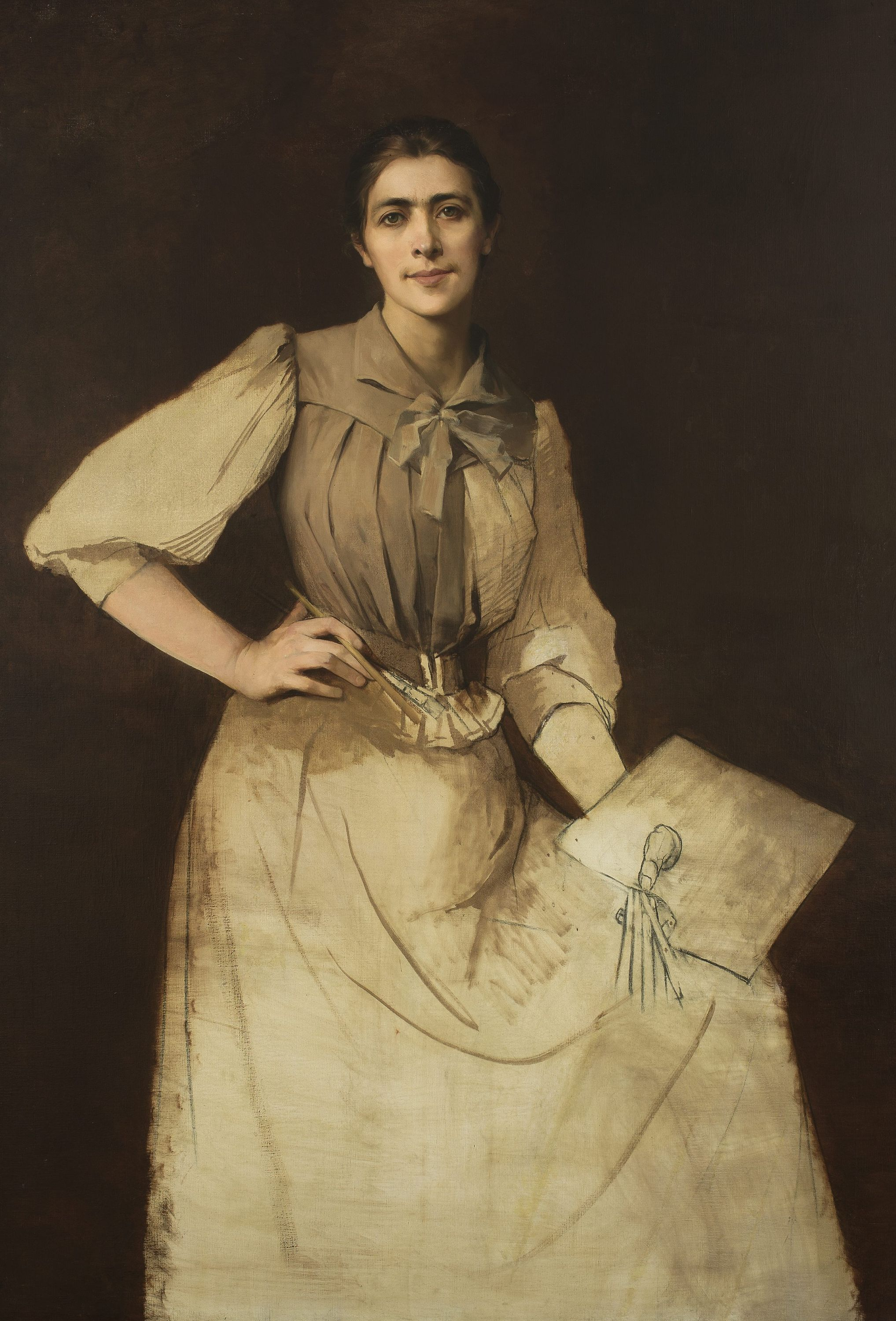
Self-Portrait, unfinished (1892), National Museum in Warsaw

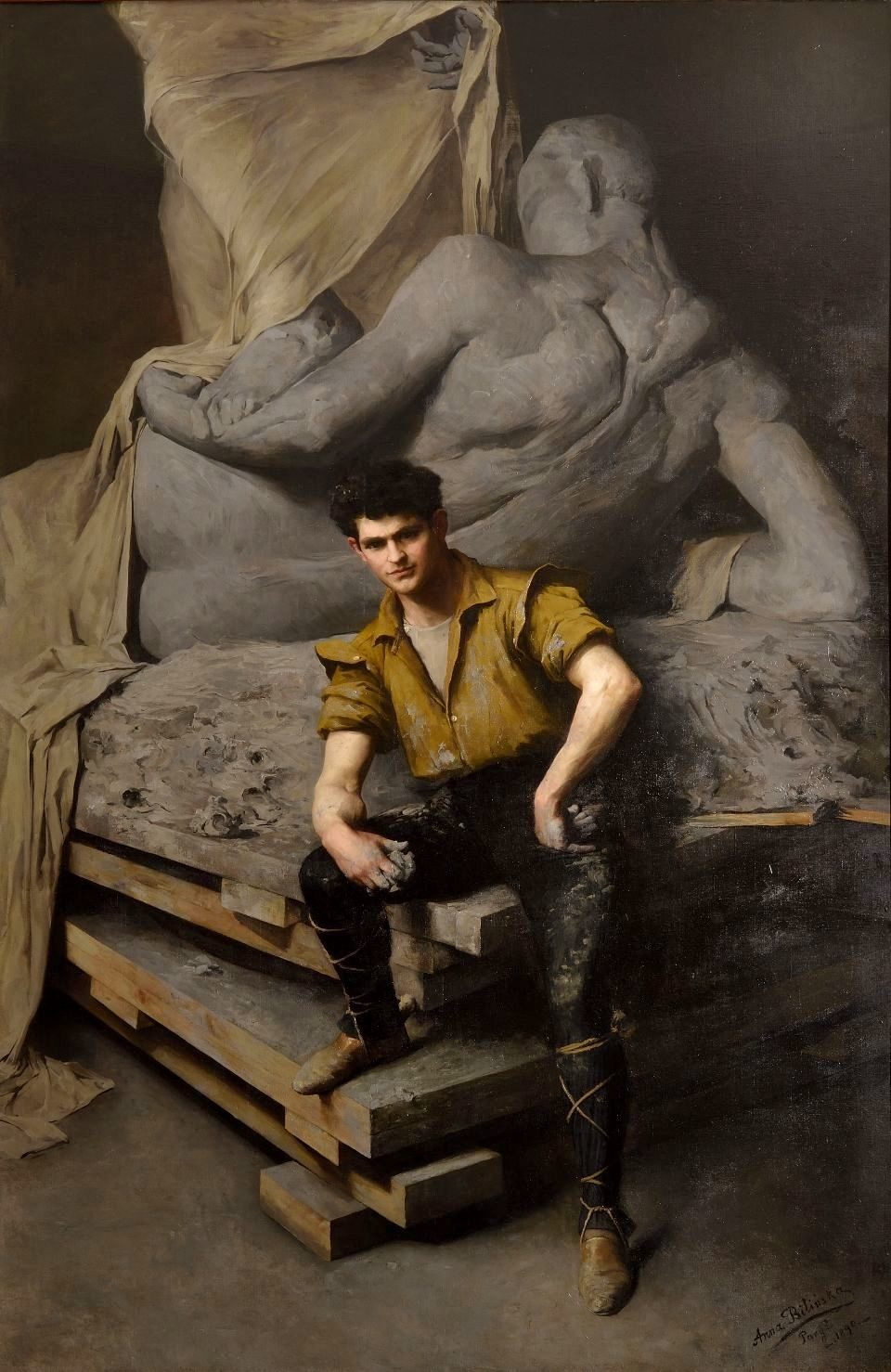
Portrait of Sculptor George Grey Barnard in His Atelier (1890), State Museum of Pennsylvania

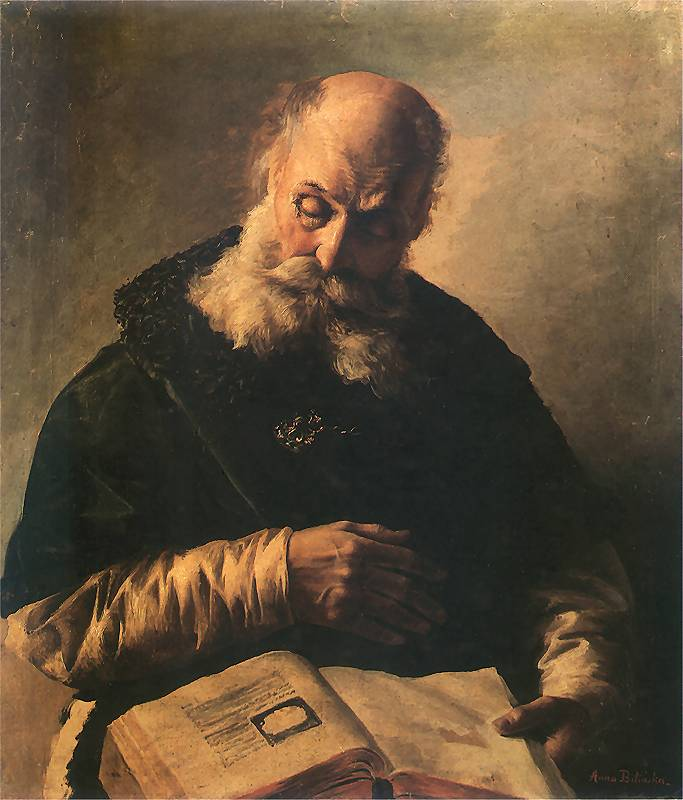
Old Man with a Book (1890s), Lviv National Art Gallery

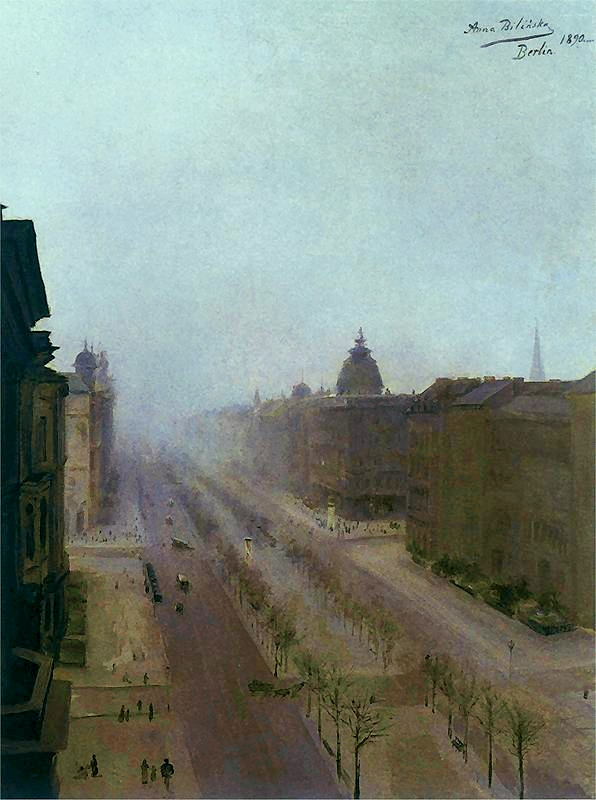
Under the Linden Trees, Berlin (1890), National Museum in Warsaw

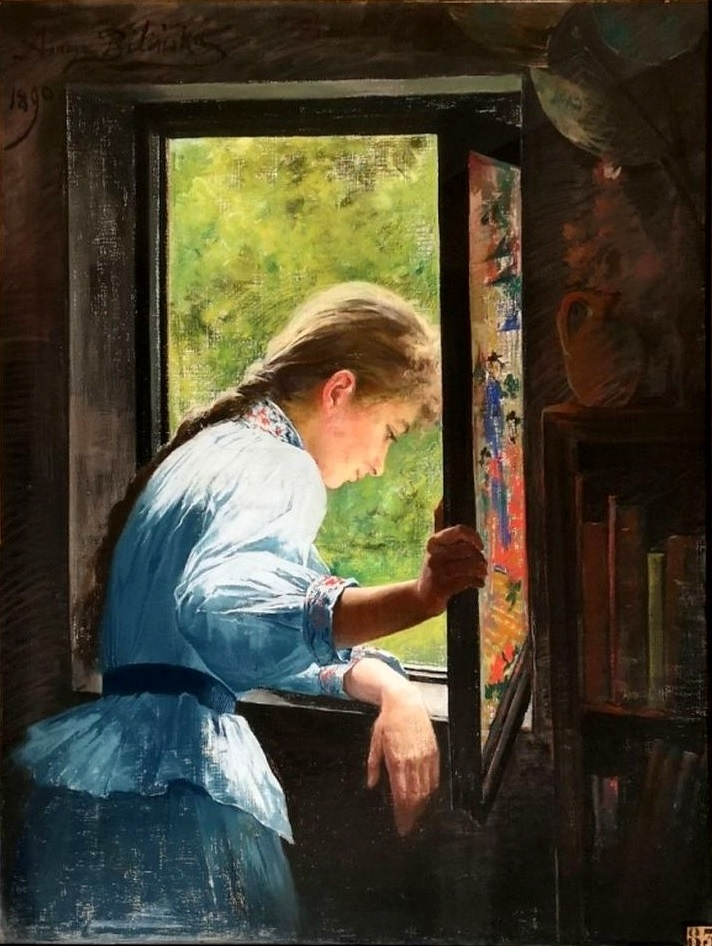
By the Window (1890), Musée d'art moderne in Saint-Étienne

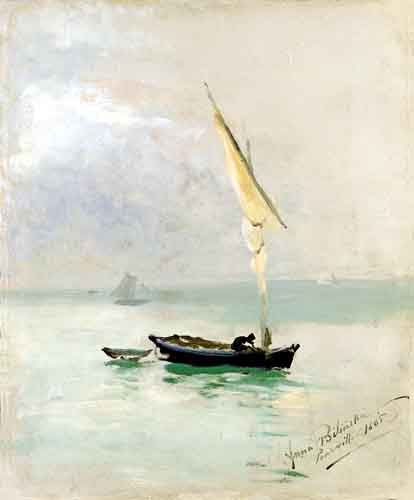
Sailing Boats in Pourville (1885), Private collection

== See also ==
- List of Polish painters

== Bibliography ==
- Clara Erskine Clement, Women in the Fine Arts from the Seventh Century B.C. to The Twentieth Century A.D., 1904
- Magdalena Schlender, Die Selbstbildnisse der polnischen Malerin Anna Bilińska (The self-portraits of the Polish painter Anna Bilińska), Hamburg 2005
- Magdalena Schlender, Anna Bilińska Bohdanowicz, probably 2009.
