= Helen Lavinia Cochrane =

British painter (1868–1946)

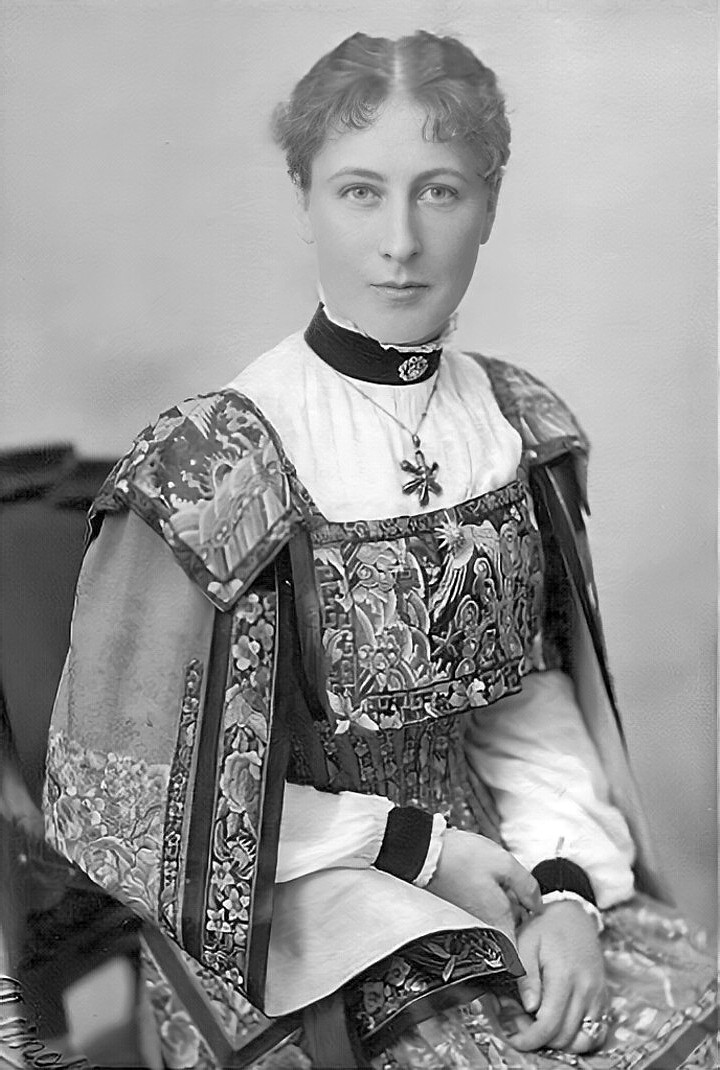
Helen Lavinia Cochrane in 1900

Helen Lavinia Cochrane (née Shaw; 1868 in Bath – 17 November 1946 in Fulham) was a British painter and draughtswoman. She spent many years in Italy, which significantly influenced her work.

== Life ==
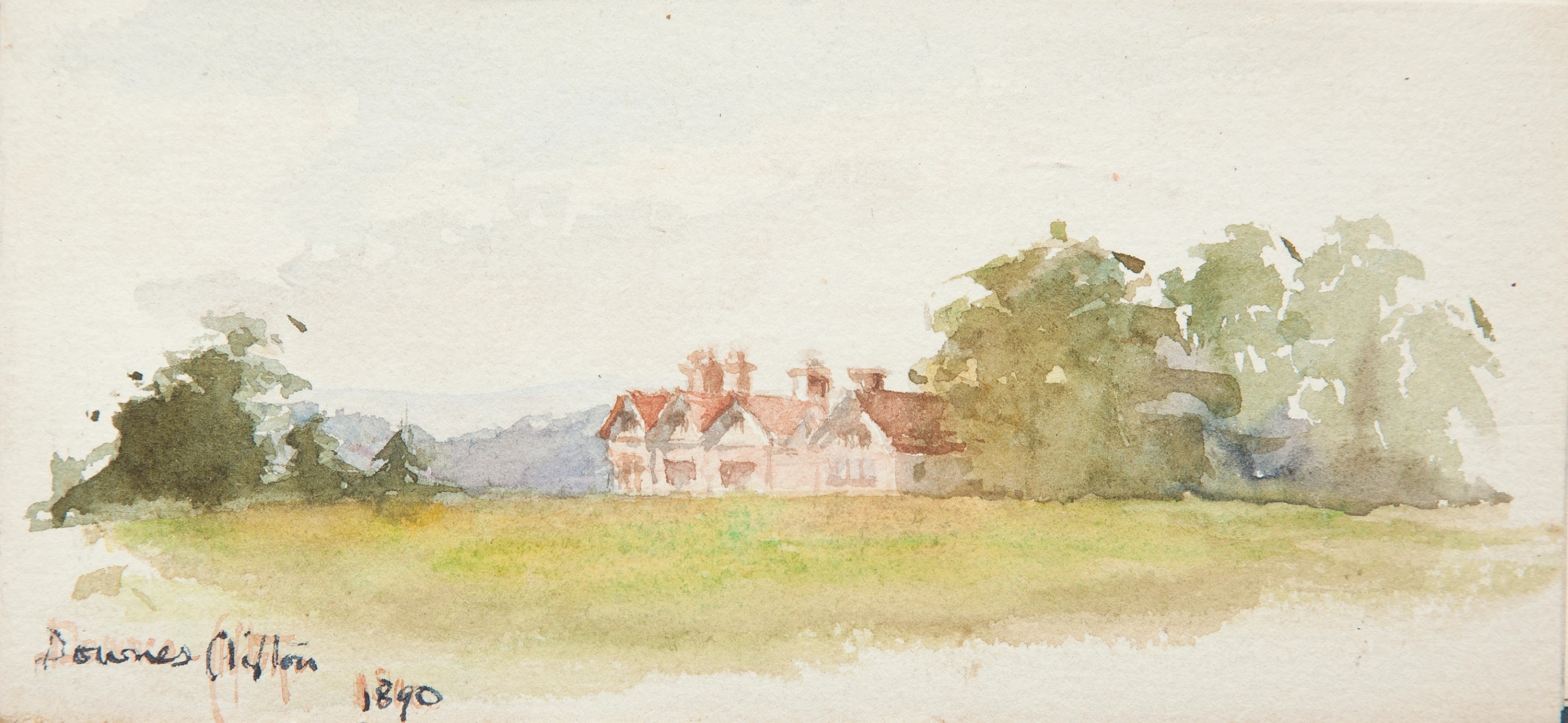
Helen Lavinia Cochrane: Downes Clifton (1890)

Her parents were Henry Shaw (1826–1880), a lawyer in Essex, and Marion Shaw (1834–1891), née Selby-Hele. Henry and Marion Shaw had a total of 11 children, Helen being one of the younger siblings. Before her birth, her family had a good social standing, until her father was implicated in a stock market fraud that led to the family's financial ruin and permanently damaged their reputation. Her father was also sentenced to prison.

In the years that followed, the Shaw family presumably relied on donations from friends and relatives. After the father's release, the family lived in London, moving from place to place. In 1868, the family left London with the intention of settling in Weymouth, Dorset on the Jurassic coast. On the way there, Helen was born in Bath. Around 1875, the family moved to the Cotswolds north of Bristol, having inherited a house there. After the father's death, the family relocated to Bristol.

Helen Cochrane attended the newly founded Clifton High School for Girls, which was designed to provide special support for girls. She developed an interest in art and attended the nearby Royal West of England Academy. After completing high school, she was accepted into the Liverpool School of Art. She later attended the Westminster School of Art in London and traveled to Munich in Bavaria in the 1890s to study portraiture under Franz von Lenbach.

On 29 November 1892, she married the entrepreneur William Percy Cochrane (1860–1937) in Mossley Hill, Lancashire, whom she had probably met while studying in Liverpool. Percy Cochrane came from a wealthy family. The company Cochrane & Co, in addition to owning ironworks in Middlesbrough and mines in Durham, had successfully established other steel and mining operations in the Dudley area. Percy Cochrane had graduated from the University of Cambridge in 1886 and now worked for the various family firms. After their marriage, the couple moved to Newcastle upon Tyne, where Percy Cochrane represented important family interests.

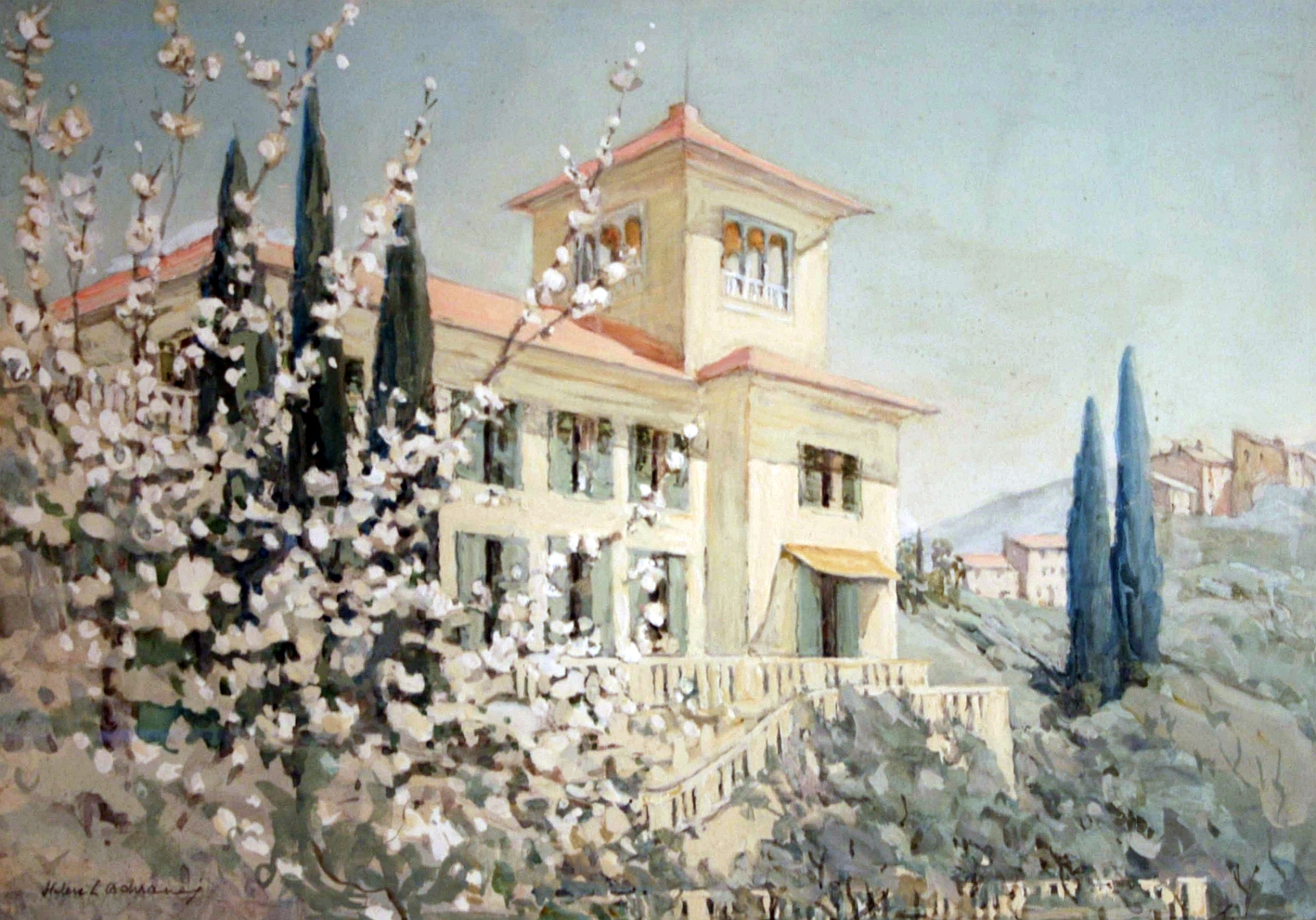
Helen Lavinia Cochrane: Villa Rezzola

In 1898, Helen and Percy Cochrane left England and settled initially in Menton, near Monte Carlo, where there was a large English colony. Later, they moved to Pugliola on the eastern Italian Riviera, located on the Gulf of La Spezia, and bought Villa Rezzola. The poet Percy Bysshe Shelley and his wife Mary Shelley had stayed nearby in San Terenzo. Lord Byron had been their guest, which is why the bay was soon known as the Golfo dei Poeti. The country and its people held a great attraction for Helen Cochrane. Photographs from around 1900 show her in traditional local costume.

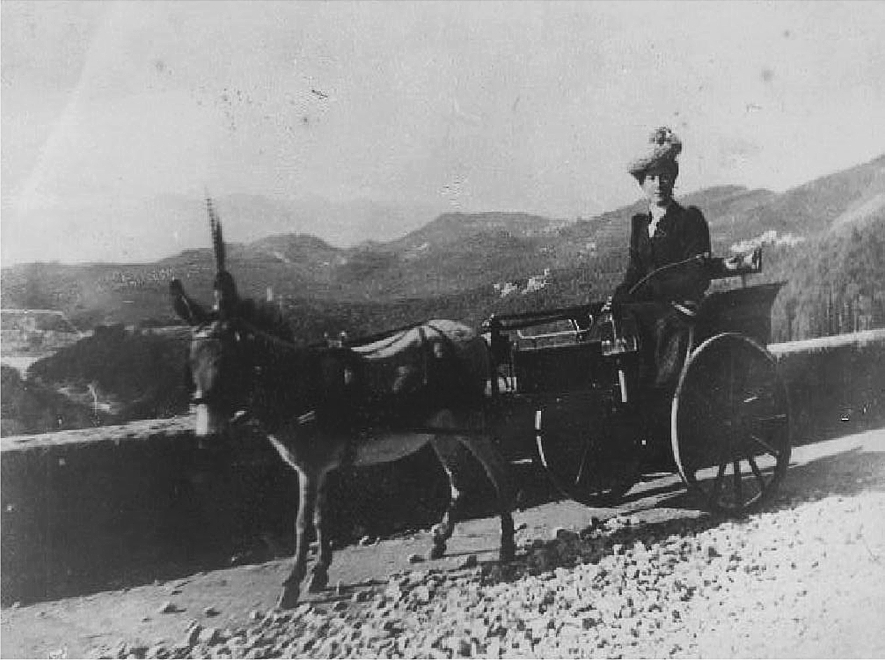
Helen Lavinia Cochrane around 1910 on the Gulf of La Spezia

Helen and Percy Cochrane encountered the difficult living conditions of the local population: unpaved roads, lack of running water, lack of sewage systems, questionable hygienic conditions, lack of medical care, illiteracy, etc. This situation made a deep impression on the wealthy English couple and awakened their philanthropic inclinations, which were typical of British society in the late 19th century.

The Cochranes commissioned a number of public works at their own expense, including a covered washhouse in Bonezzola, a drinking water pipeline from Bonezzola to Bagnola, the construction of a paved road in Pugliola, and a large two-story kindergarten with a dining hall. In nearby Sarzana, they oversaw the expansion of the hospital with an annex for infectious diseases. Cochrane built comfortable farmhouses for his farmers and also provided modern stables and fertilizers.

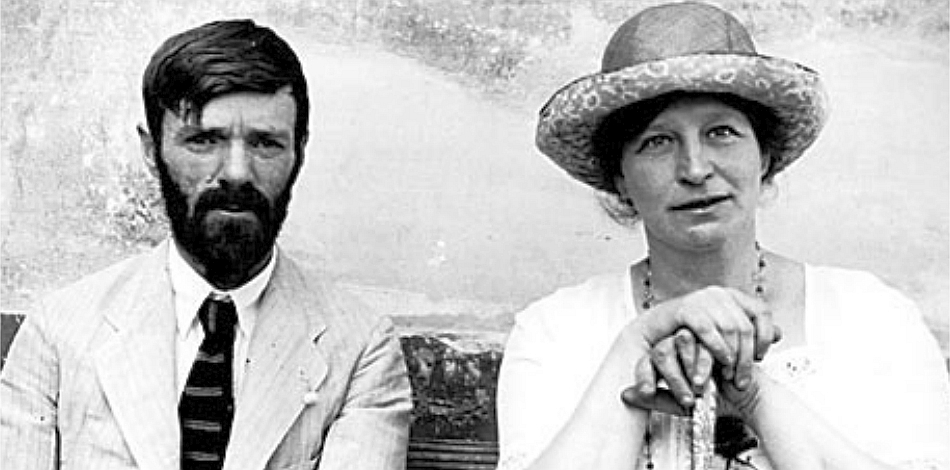
David Herbert Lawrence and Frieda von Richthofen in 1914

The Cochrane villa was frequented by officials and officers of the army and navy, including generals and admirals, and was the site of numerous festivities. Between 1913 and 1914, DH Lawrence and his future wife, Frieda von Richthofen, lived in a house in Fiascherino and regularly visited the Cochranes at their villa. The high-ranking naval officer Reginald Bacon, a cousin of Helen Cochrane, was also a frequent guest of the Cochranes during these years.

After the outbreak of the First World War in 1914, Percy Cochrane and others rented the Imperial Hotel in Menton and set up a military hospital there. Helen Cochrane worked there as a nurse and received the Médaille de la Reconnaissance française in recognition of her services. After Italy entered the war on the side of the Triple Entente in 1915, he and his wife converted the Villa Massà in Sarzana into a modern military hospital with operating rooms. Helen Cochrane hired English nurses and provided drinking water and heating for the building. The hospital's operations were overseen by Helen Cochrane as director and Percy Cochrane as administrator.

The Cochranes' marriage remained childless. In 1911, they adopted their niece Marion Winifred Jacques, a daughter of Helen's sister Evie. Marion was 18 years old at the time of her adoption. She also worked at the Menton military hospital during the First World War. In 1917, Marion died suddenly in London of bacterial endocarditis, shortly after her wedding.

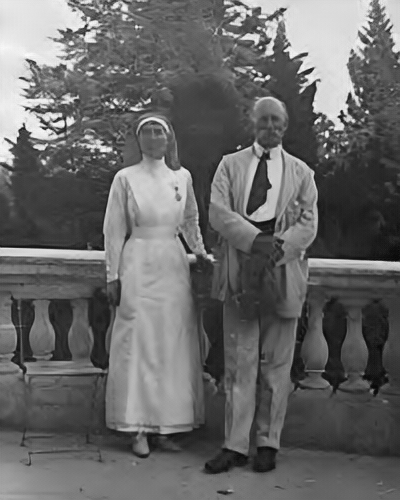
Helen and Percy Cochrane in 1917

Apparently, Helen and Percy Cochrane became estranged during their work helping the many war victims, as the couple separated after the war. Percy Cochrane's health also contributed to this. In 1920, Percy Cochrane left Pugliola and moved to Menton, where he lived with Rose Emily Sims until his death in 1937. Helen Cochrane, however, continued to live at Villa Rezzola and entertained prominent figures, including the artists Emmeline Deane, William Rothenstein, Max Beerbohm, and the physicist Oliver Lodge.

In the following years, Helen Cochrane undertook numerous trips, including to Venice, Rome, Sardinia, Corfu, and the Balearic Islands. After Benito Mussolini seized power and established a dictatorship in the 1920s, living conditions for the British immigrants changed little. However, the Abyssinian War of 1935 caused relations between Italy and Great Britain to deteriorate significantly.

Like several others, Helen Cochrane decided to leave Italy for fear of reprisals from the regime. She sold Villa Rezzola to Countess Mara Braida Carnevale and moved to London in 1935. Helen Cochrane settled in the Fulham district and witnessed the German bombing raids on London during the Second World War. She survived the war and died in Fulham in 1946 at the age of 78. She bequeathed her small collection of paintings, which included her own works as well as pictures by Emmeline Deane, to the Victoria Art Gallery in Bath.

== Work ==
The diverse artistic oeuvre developed by Helen Cochrane over the course of about half a century is virtually unknown today. Most of her work is lost or in private ownership. Only a few works are held in museums or public archives. The Victoria Art Gallery in Bath has some paintings in its collection. Traces of her work have survived in the catalogues of some exhibitions. Her works, most of which are undated, include oil paintings, watercolors, tempera, and drawings. Helen Cochrane was a member of the Royal Institution of Great Britain (RI) and the Society of Women Artists (SWA).

In the 1880s and 1890s, Helen Cochrane created watercolors and sketches of Bristol, Newcastle-upon-Tyne, and the surrounding landscapes, as well as some oil portraits. A substantial output survives from subsequent decades, particularly watercolors, mainly depicting the landscapes and locations of the Gulf of La Spezia, including Pugliola, Lerici, Tellaro, Porto Venere, but also places in Lunigiana such as Sarzana, Ameglia, Fosdinovo, and Aulla. Also preserved are watercolors of the country house where D.H. Lawrence lived from 1913 to 1914.

Her watercolours are professionally executed and depict calm and pleasant subjects. DH Lawrence described Helen Cochrane as a talented watercolorist. Her few tempera works, however, document in detail the working practices of Italian rural life in the 1920s, with a clearly expressed affection for the people and the land. She completed some of these tempera paintings only after her return to England. In her later years, she created several paintings depicting the fires and destruction in London caused by the German bombings.

During the 1920s and 1930s, Helen Cochrane exhibited her work in galleries several times during her stays in London. Her paintings were also shown at the Walker Art Gallery, the Royal Academy of Arts (RA), and the Royal Society of British Artists (RBA). The Times of London described her work in 1925 as a series of pleasant associations that evoke no expectation of reality, but only the memory of beauty.

== Gallery ==
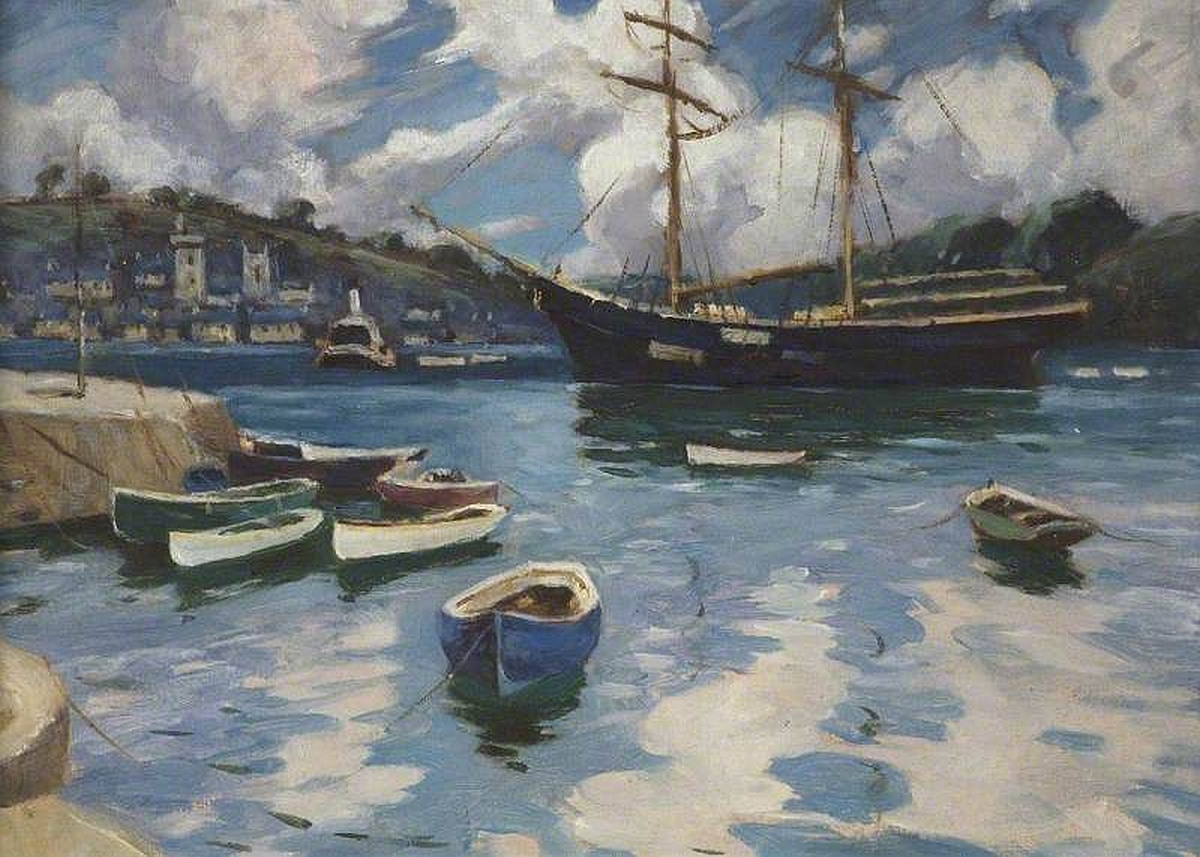
Harbour Scene

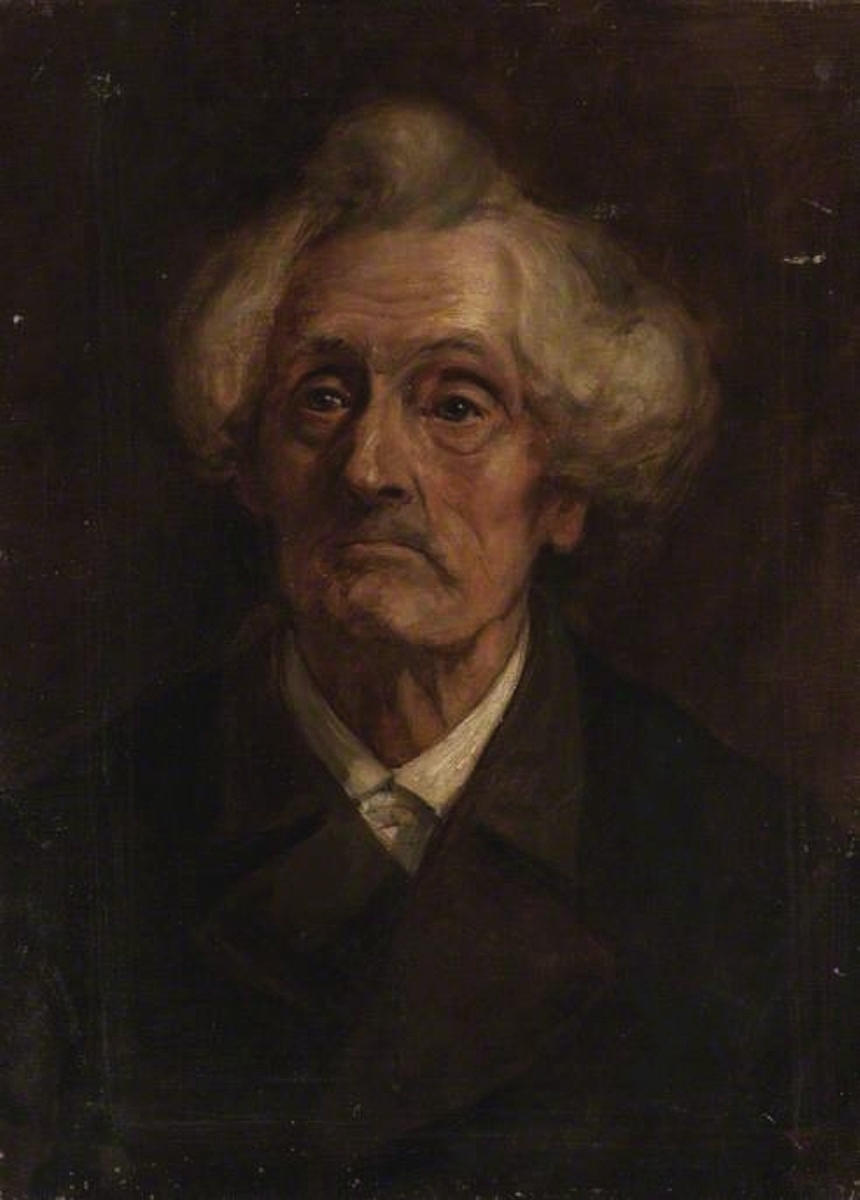
Study of a Man (1889)

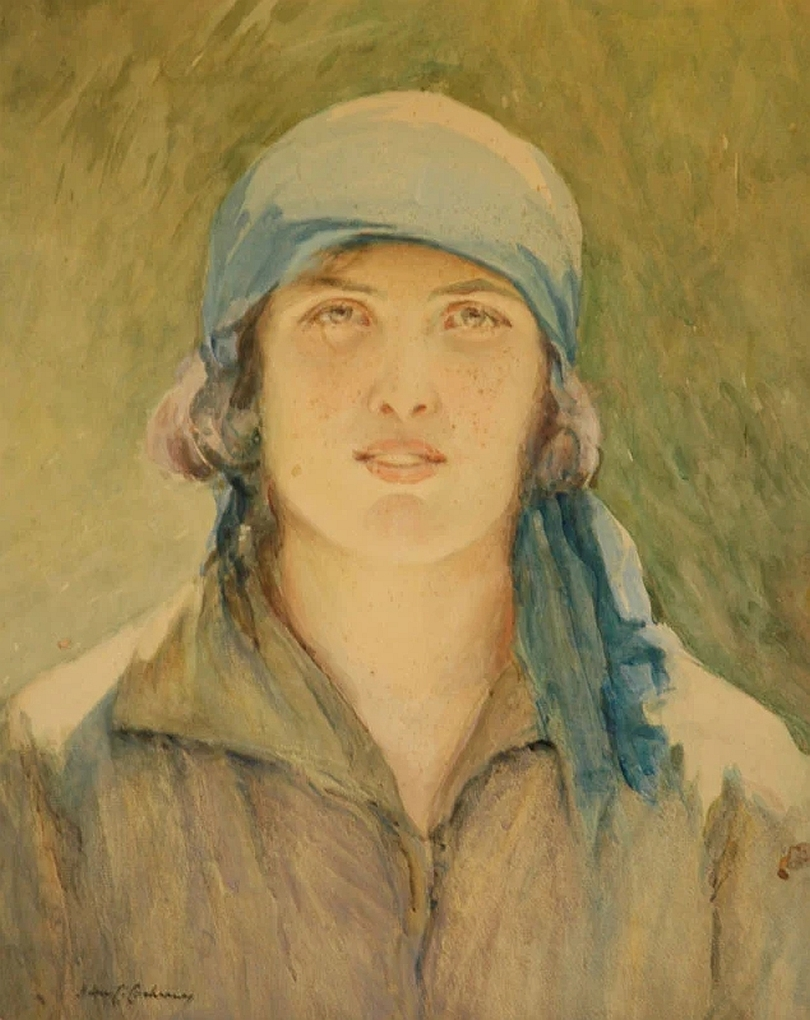
Young Woman

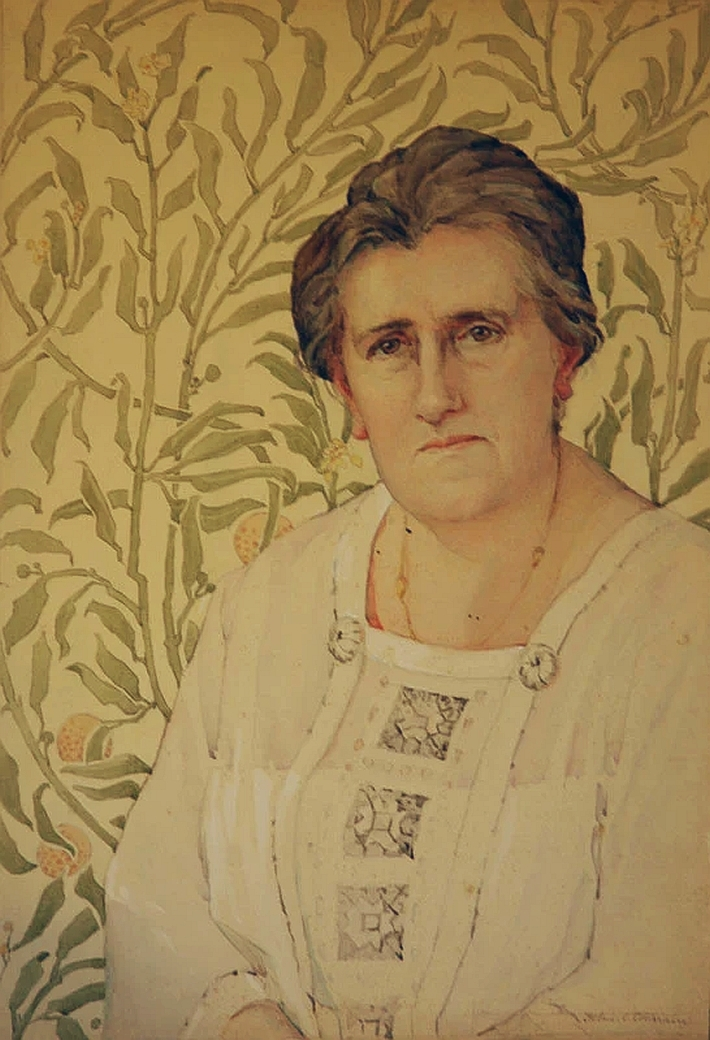
Old Lady (Gertrude Metcalfe-Shaw)

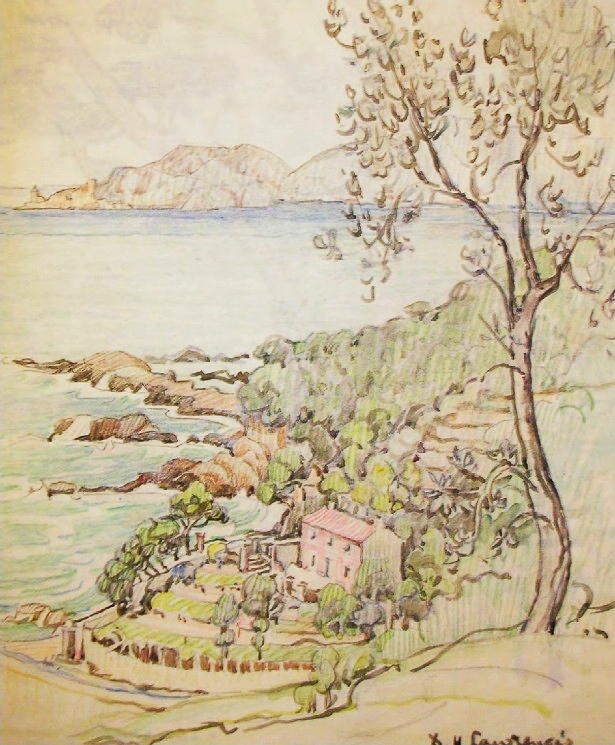
D.H. Lawrence’s Cottage

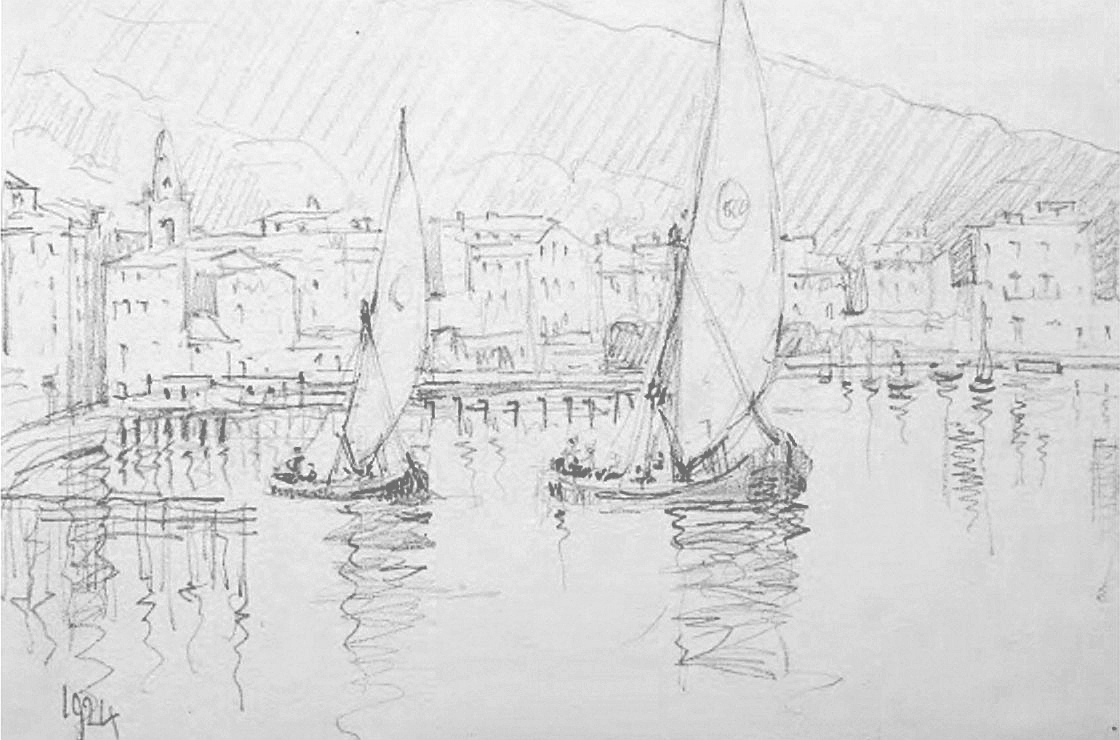
Lerici (1924)

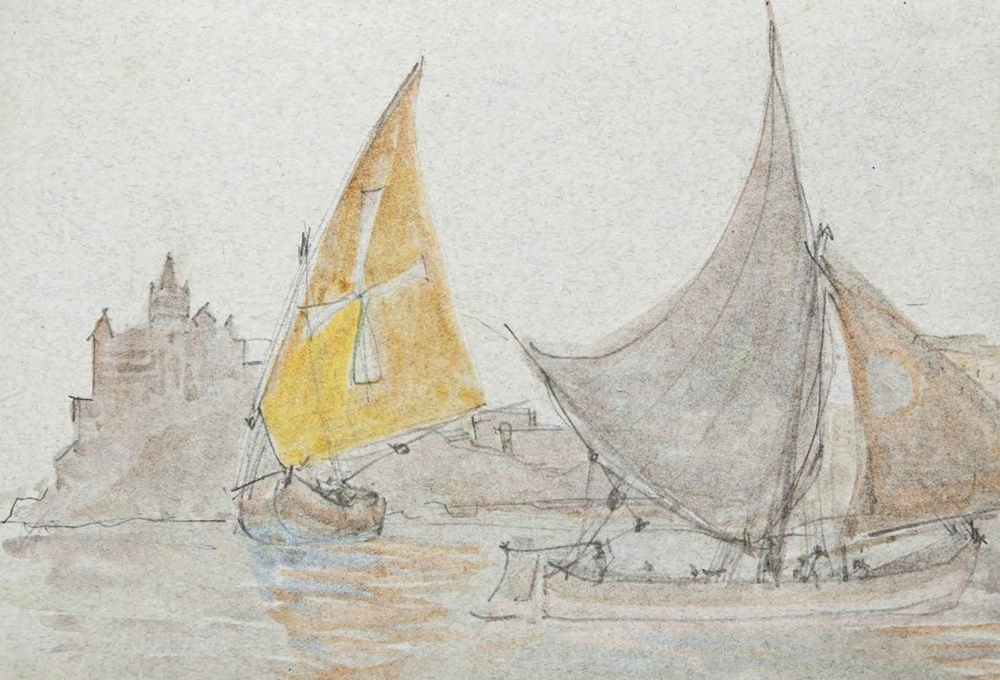
Sailing Boats at Porto Venere

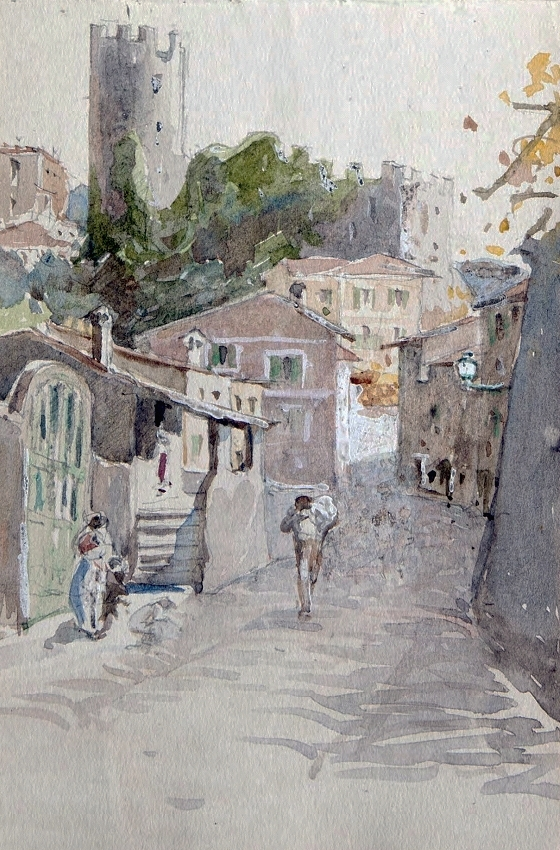
Ameglia

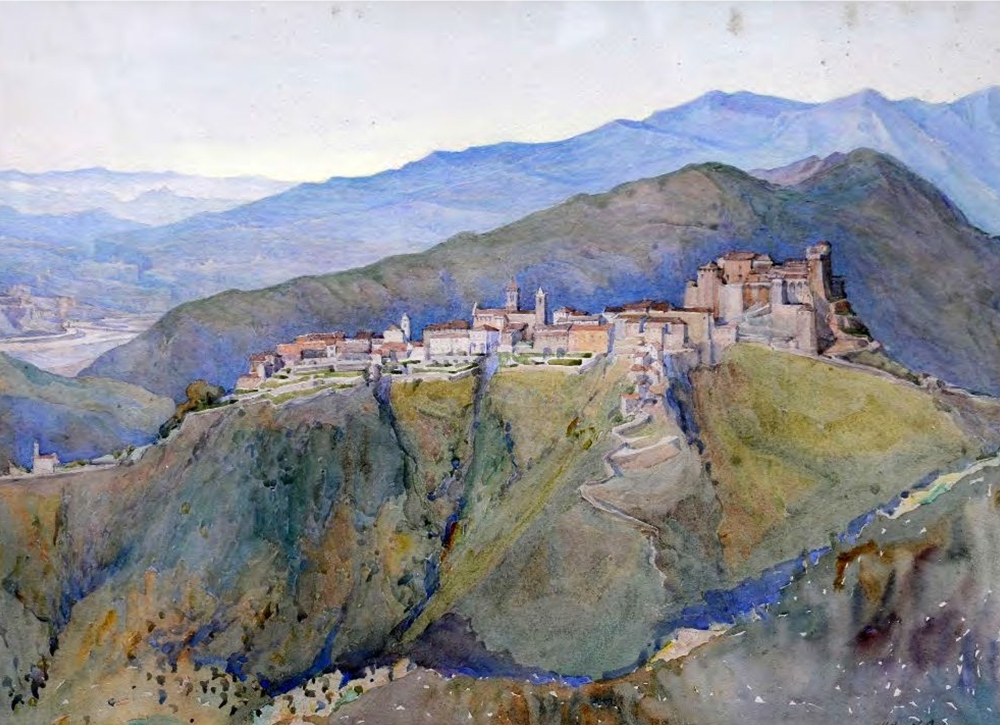
Fosdinovo

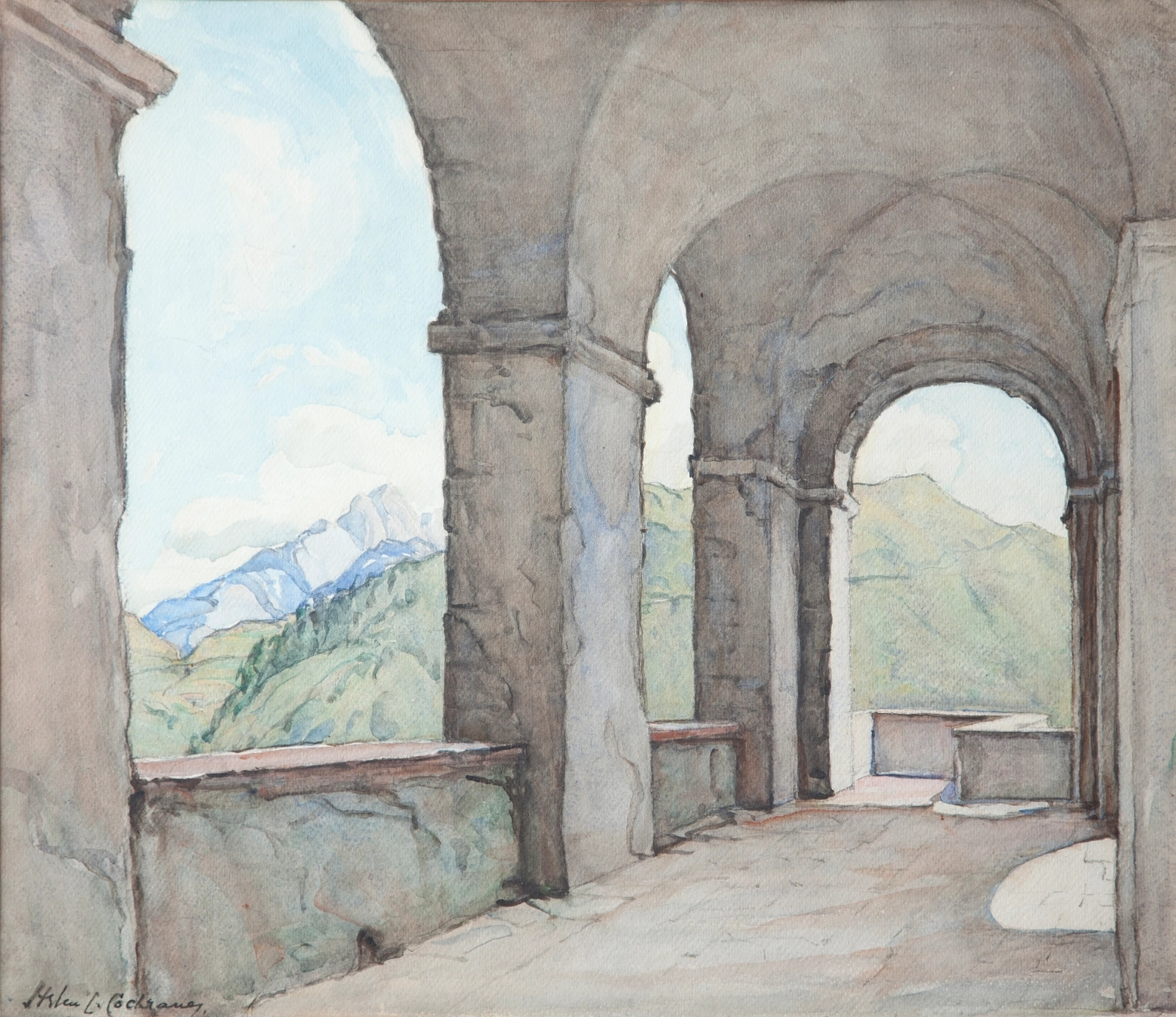
Castello Malaspina, Fosdinovo

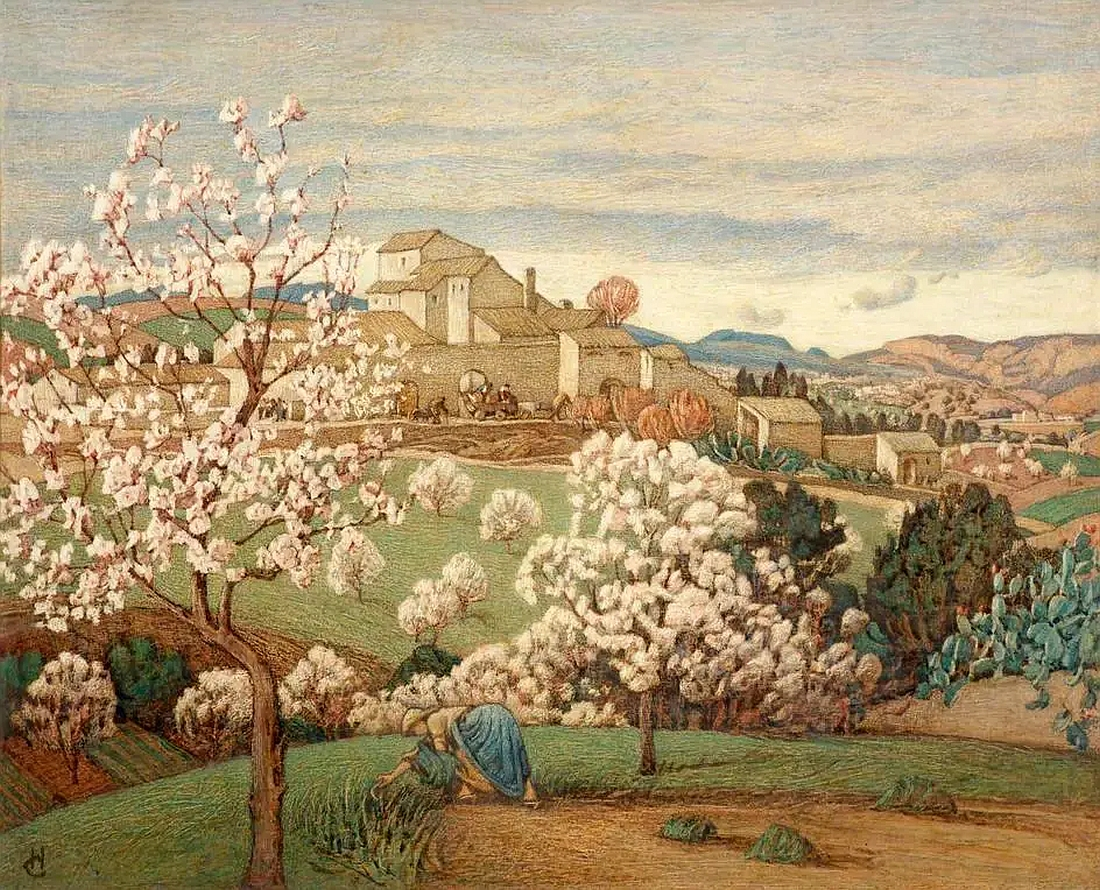
Almond Blossom, Majorca

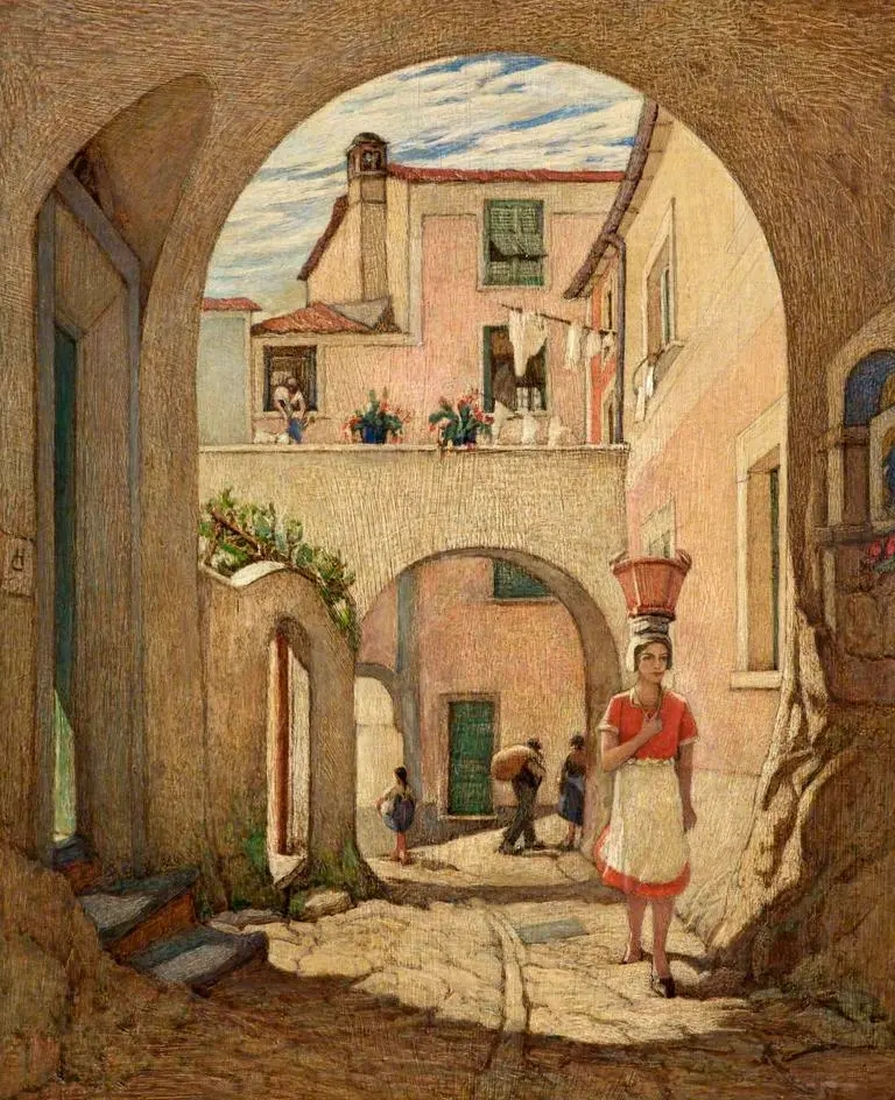
Village road, Pugliola

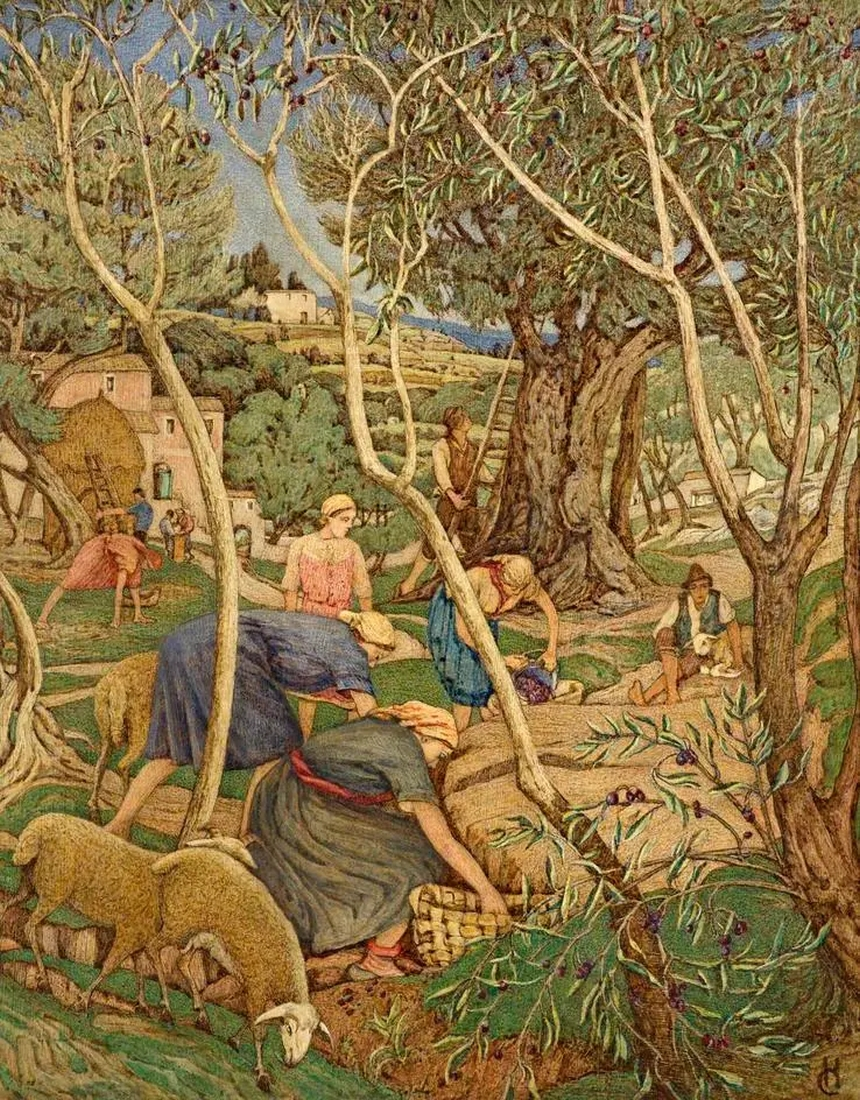
Olive Gatherers (1939)

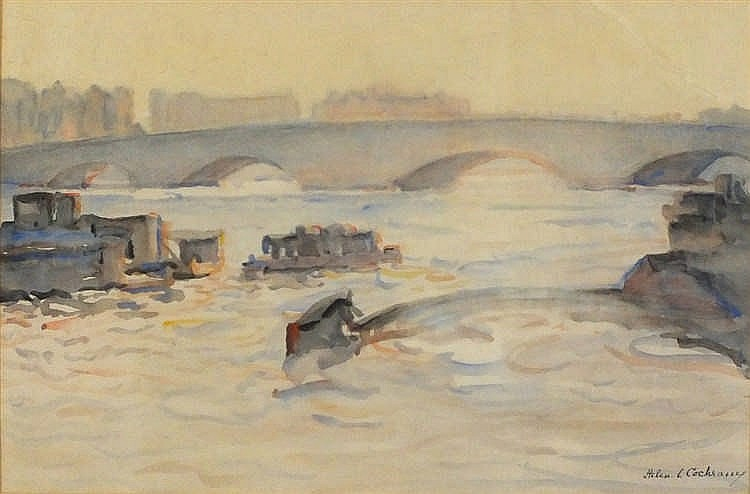
Evening, Putney Bridge (1940)

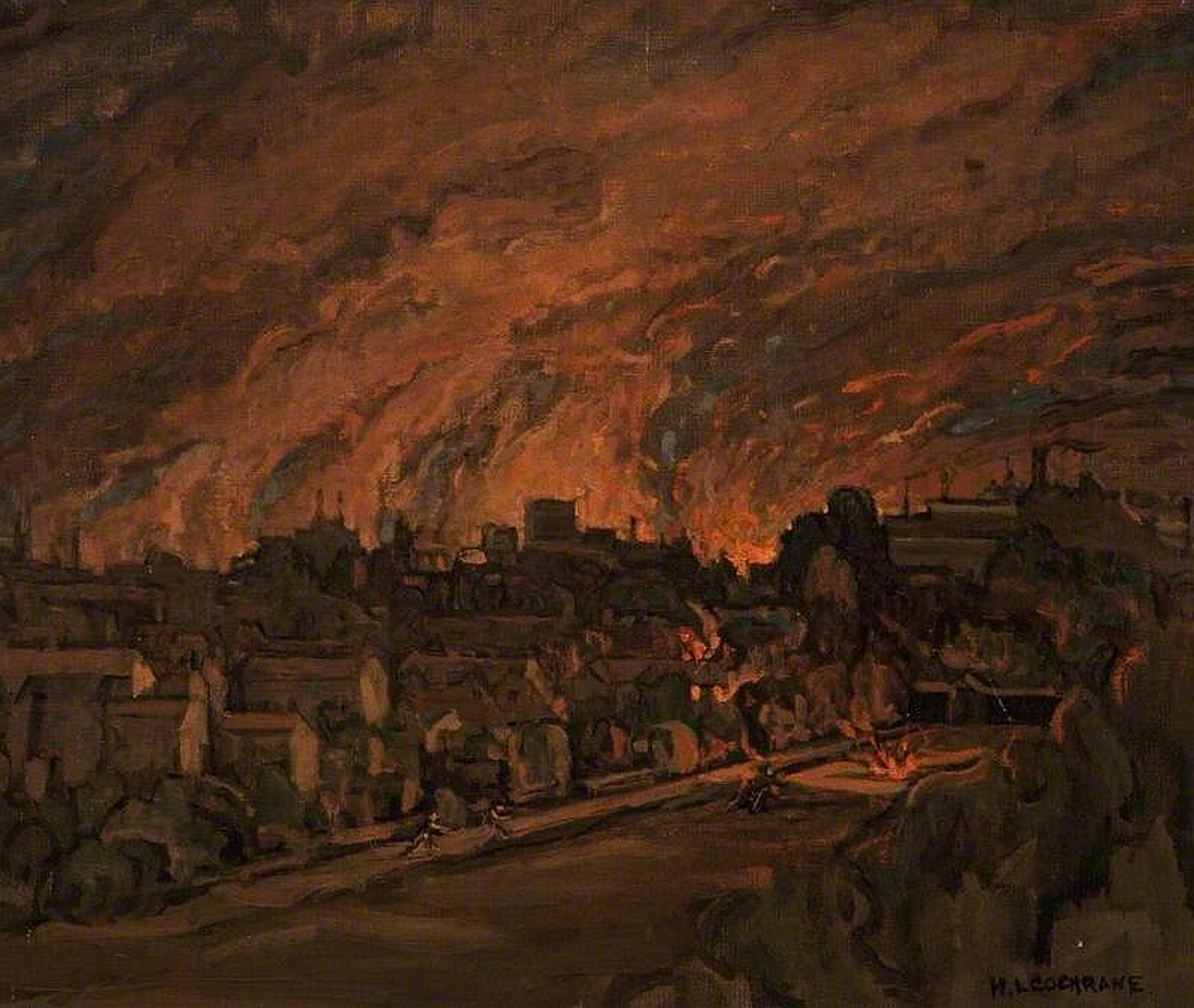
London Dock Fires (1940)

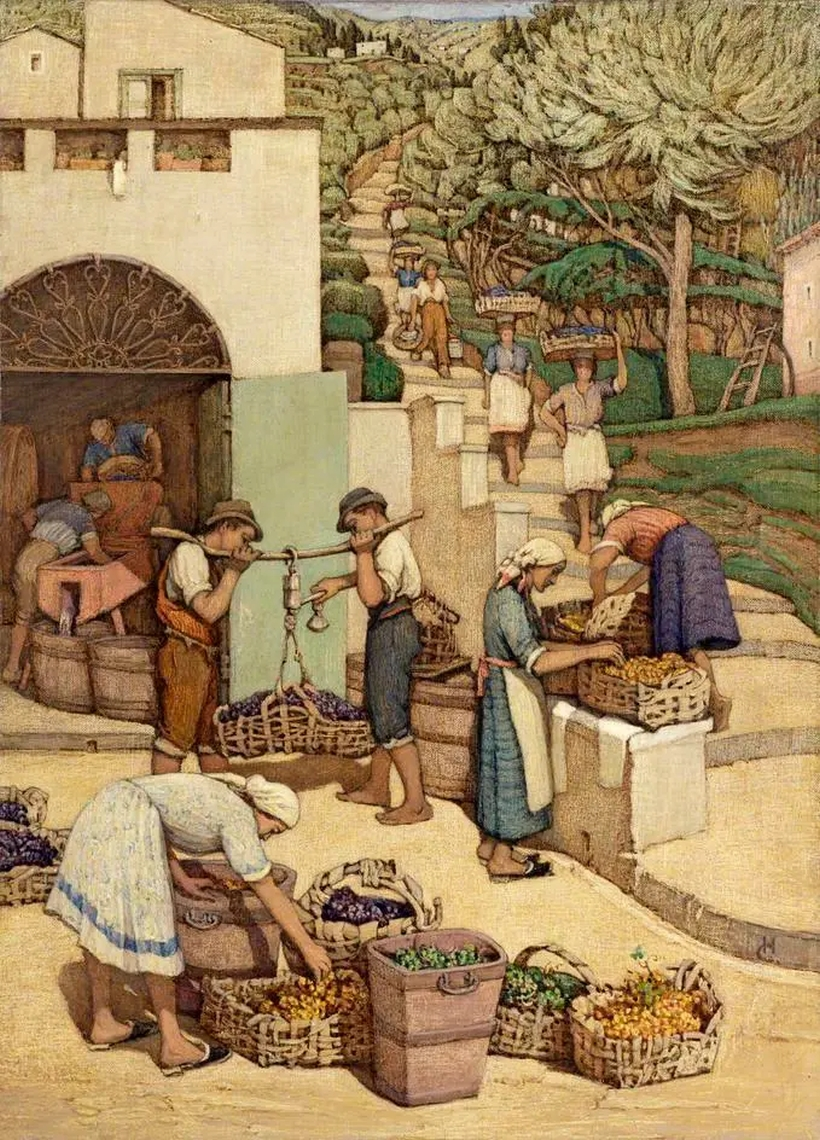
Bringing Down Mountain Grapes (1942)

== Solo exhibitions (selection) ==
- 1925: Gallery of the Fine Art Society, London
- 1929: Gallery of the Fine Art Society, London
- 1938: Gallery of the Fine Art Society, London
- 1945: Fulham Library, London

== Literature ==
- Vaughan Bryers, Fabio Rolla: Villa Rezzola a Pugliola nel Golfo della Spezia. 2019 (Digitalisat).
