= Emmeline Deane =

British painter

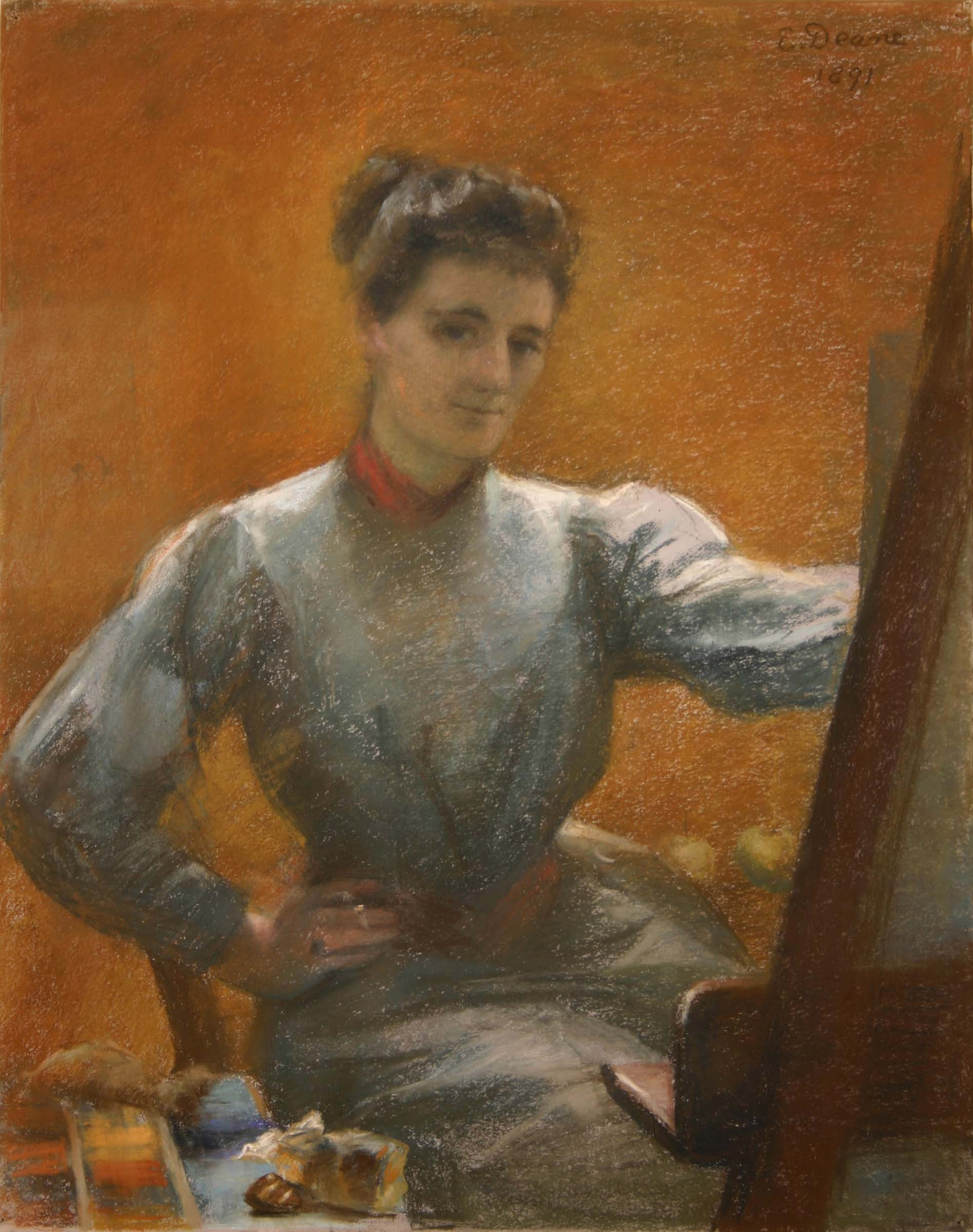
- self-portrait, 1891
- Born: 1858; Bath
- Died: 1944 (aged 85–86); Uxbridge
- Occupation: Painter
- Parent(s): John Bathurst Deane
- Relatives: Mary Bathurst Deane, Eleanor Deane

Emmeline Deane (1858 – 1944) was a British portrait painter.

Emmeline Deane was born in Bath, one of thirteen children of the Rev. John Bathurst Deane, a South African-born English clergyman and author, and Louisa Deane, daughter of Sealy Fourdrinier. Her siblings included novelist Mary Bathurst Deane and Eleanor Deane Wodehouse, mother of author P. G. Wodehouse.

Deane trained at the Académie Julian in Paris. She exhibited numerous times at the Royal Academy between 1879 and 1892. Her works include a portrait of Cardinal John Henry Newman, her first cousin once removed, that is in the National Portrait Gallery and a celebrated portrait of painter Anna Bilińska, her classmate in Paris, in mourning dress that is in the Victoria Art Gallery. Bilińska's portrait, depicting the artist in deep mourning, was painted by Deane in Paris shortly after Bilińska's father died in 1882. This painting evoked such emotional intensity of loss that, when exhibited in Paris and London, it "caused such a stir that it featured in a cartoon in Punch magazine." The work is considered to be significant because it was not common, at that time, for women painters to create formal salon-style portraits of other women painters, let alone to exhibit them.

Emmeline Deane died in 1944 in Uxbridge.
