= Maria Gażycz =

Polish artist (1860–1935)

- Марыя Гажыч
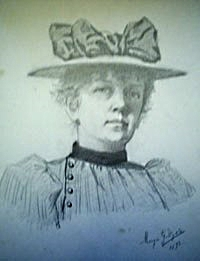
- Self-portrait, drawing from the album
- Born: Maria Nowina-Chrzanowska; 20 March 1860; Vishera, Kursk Governorate
- Died: 13 September 1935 (aged 75); Grodno, Grodno County, Białystok Voivodeship, Republic of Poland
- Occupations: Painter, art restorer

Maria Gażycz, née Maria Nowina-Chrzanowska (20 March 1860, Vishera, Kursk Governorate – 13 September 1935, Grodno) was a Belarusian-born Polish figure painter, art restorer, and nun in the order of the Sisters of the Holy Family of Nazareth.

== Biography ==
Her father was an engineer; involved in the building of railways and bridges in Kursk. Her Swedish mother, Elzbieta, was a member of the aristocratic Nobel family. According to her mother's wishes, she was raised in the strict Orthodox tradition. Their winters were generally spent in Warsaw.

She and her three siblings were educated at home. From 1874 to 1878, she studied in Warsaw with Wojciech Gerson. In 1878, she had her first exhibition at the Zachęta and married Konstantin Gażycz (1848-1900), who owned an estate in the Grodno Region. They had a son who died in infancy.

Later, she studied in Munich and, from 1891 to 1895, attended the Académie Julian in Paris, where she worked with William-Adolphe Bouguereau, Tony Robert-Fleury and Jules Joseph Lefebvre.

When she was widowed, she went to live with her sister, Janina, in Kraków. The following year she converted to Catholicism and, in 1906, entered the convent of the Sisters of Nazareth in Rome. She took her first vows in 1908, and her perpetual vows in 1912. After that, she signed her paintings as "Sister Paula of Nazareth".

Until 1919, she served at the Sisters' convent dedicated to the Annunciation in Grodno, followed by service in Lublin. From 1923 to 1928, she was Mistress of novices in Albano and was Superior of the convent there until 1932. As her health began to fail, she retired to Grodno, where she died.

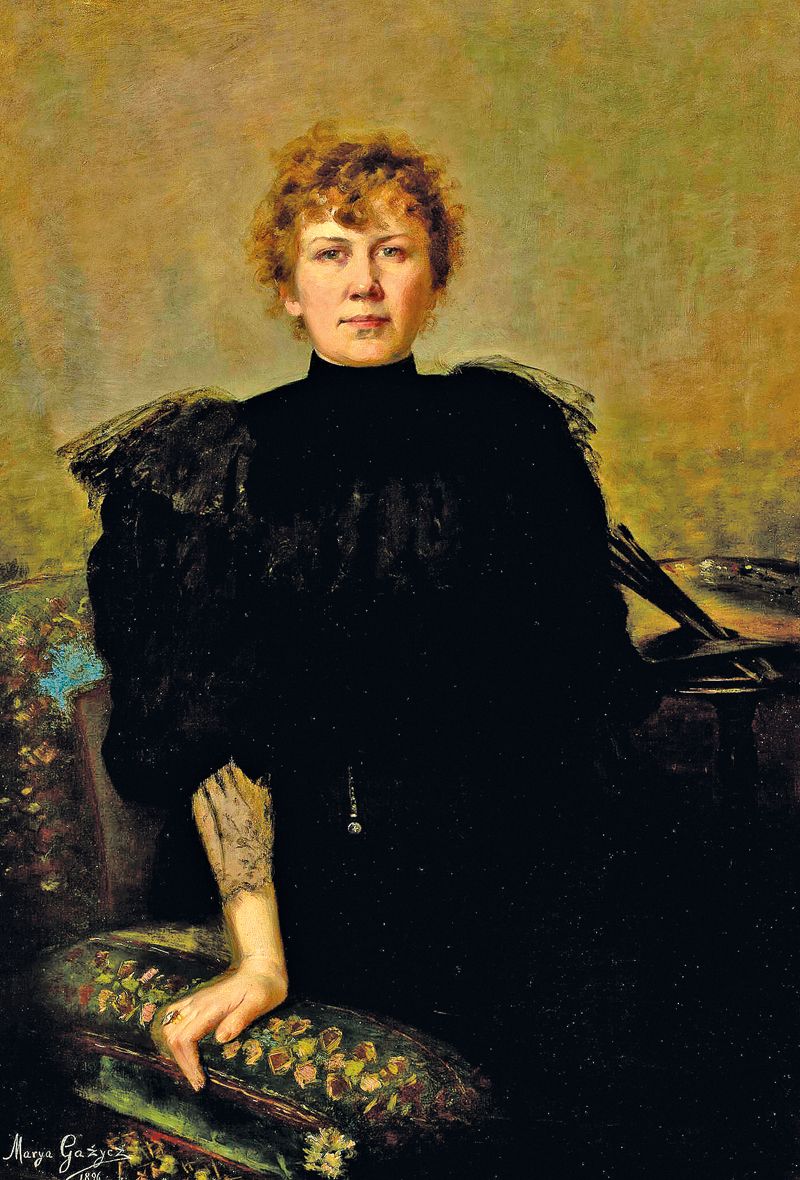
Self-portrait with Palette (1896)

== Selected paintings ==
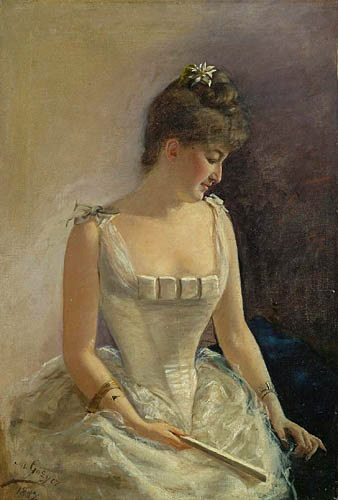
Lady Dressed for a Ball

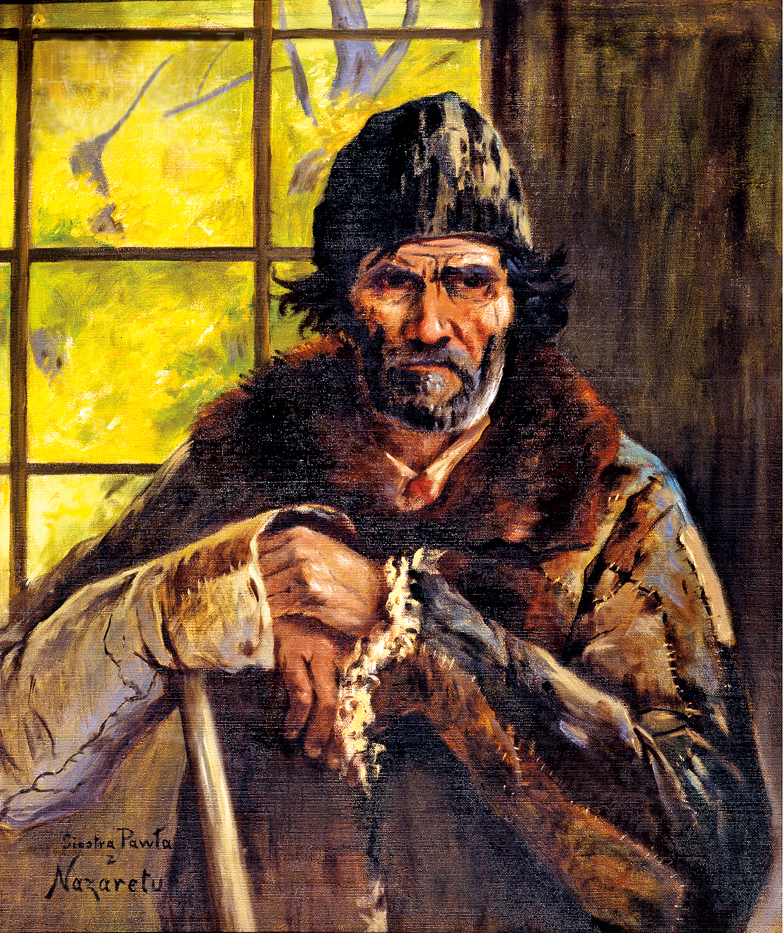
Peasant

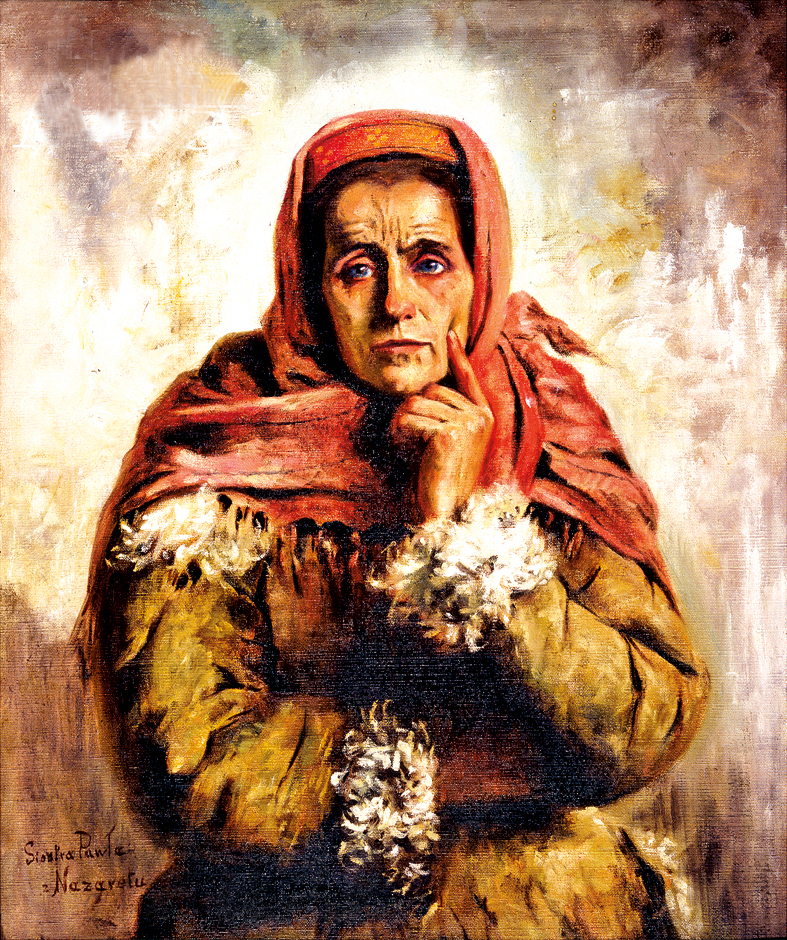
Peasant Woman

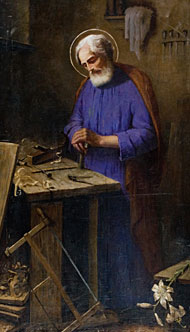
Saint Joseph
