= A Negress =

1884 painting by Anna Bilińska

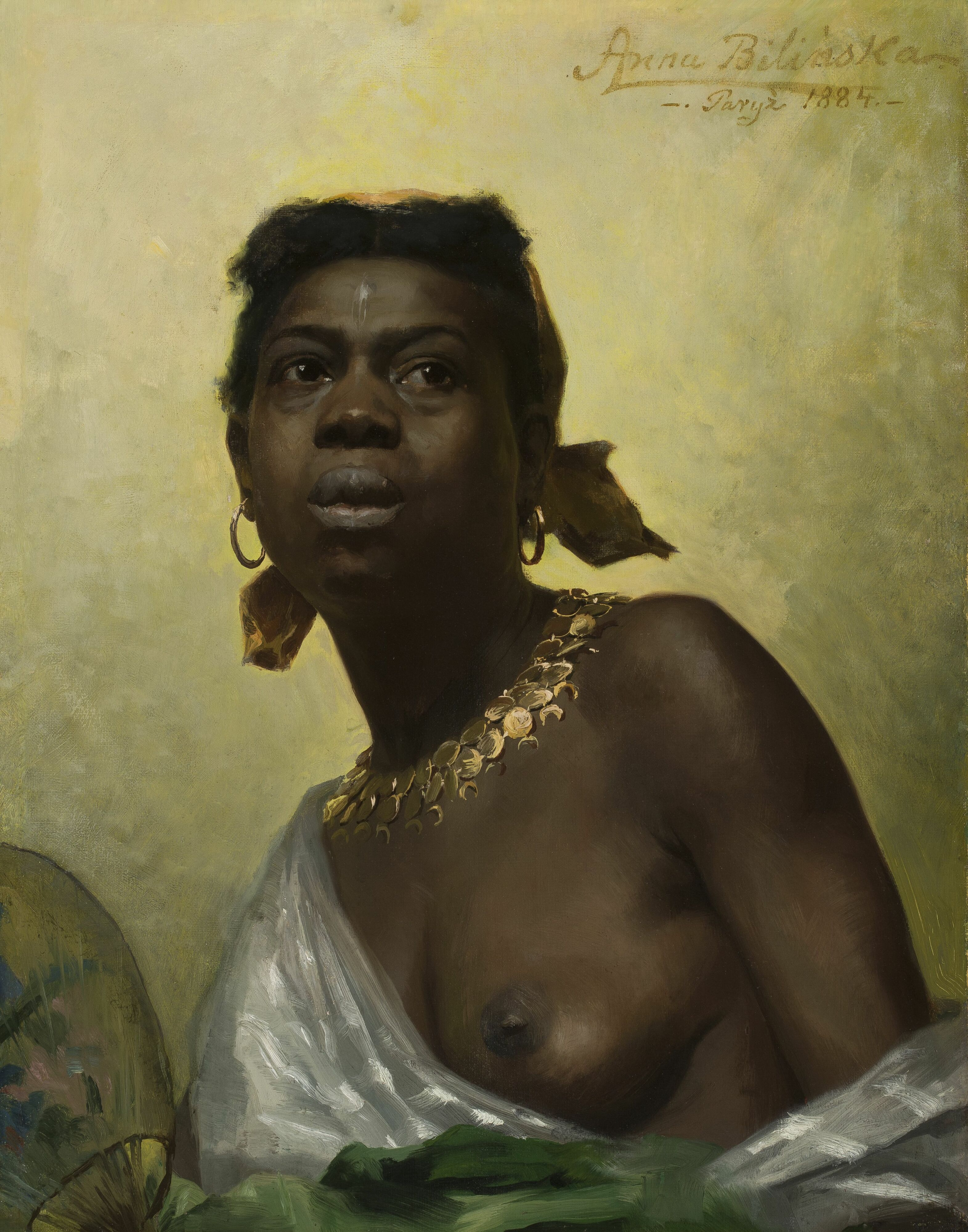
- Artist: Anna Bilińska
- Year: 1884
- Medium: Oil on canvas
- Dimensions: 63 cm × 48.8 cm (25 in × 19.2 in)
- Location: National Museum; Warsaw

A Negress (Polish: Murzynka) is an 1884 oil painting by the Polish artist Anna Bilińska. The painting was stolen from the National Museum in Warsaw during World War II and remained missing until it appeared at auction in 2011 and was returned to the museum in 2012.

== Description ==
The work was painted in Paris, while the artist was studying under Tony Robert-Fleury at the Académie Julian. It may take inspiration from the Portrait of Madeleine made in 1800 by Marie-Guillemine Benoist.

The painting is a realist half-length portrait of a black woman, shown from waist up dressed in a white robe which has slipped off one shoulder, exposing the left breast. She is wearing a gold necklace, gold hoop earrings, and a yellow head scarf, and holding a Japanese fan to her right with trailing green fabric. The sitter may have been a life model posed on a stage. She is viewed from below, tightly framed against a plain light background, looking back over the head of the viewer, with an uncomfortable expression: perhaps self-conscious or embarrassed. The paint is applied thinly but the work is highly finished, in academic style. This type of painting of an exotic person was popular in the late nineteenth century. The canvas is prominently signed and dated in the upper right corner, "Anna Bilińska / - Paryż 1884 -".

== History ==
The painting was exhibited in Paris and in London in 1888, and was probably brought to Poland after the artist's death in 1893 by her husband, the doctor Antoni Bohdanowicz. It was acquired by the Polish art collector Dominik Witke-Jeżewski before 1916. He deposited the canvas with the rest of his collection at the National Museum in Warsaw in 1933. In 1939, the painting was purchased by the National Museum for 700 zlotys (roughly equivalent to $3,100 in 2025). The painting was stolen in unknown circumstances at some point during World War II and was sought by Poland after 1945. The painting reappeared in 2011 when it was put up for auction at Villa Grisebach in Germany. It was purchased for Poland thanks to the effort of the Polish Ministry of Culture and National Heritage and the support of the Kronenberg Foundation of Citi Handlowy Bank. The picture has been on display again at the National Museum in Warsaw since 2012.

== See also ==
- Looted art
- World War II looting of Poland
