= List of types of paper =

Paper is a material medium that can be produced from multiple types of cellulose. Papers of similar materials can be further altered into different types by specific processing, some with defining additives.

== Types of paper by cellulose source ==
- Bark —
  - Amate
  - Banana bark paper
  - Barkcloth
  - Daluang paper
  - Dó paper
  - Hanji
  - Khoi paper
  - Lokta paper and Bhutanese paper
  - Saa paper
  - Samarkand paper
  - Washi
- Bast fiber —
  - Hemp paper
  - India paper
- Leaf fiber —
  - Abacá Manila paper
  - Aburatorigami
- Pith —
  - Bagasse paper
  - Papyrus
  - Pith paper
- Fruit fiber and seed fiber —
  - Banana peel paper
  - Cotton paper
- Wood —
  - Pulpwood paper
- Mixed fiber —
  - Mummy paper
  - Rag paper
  - Xuan paper

== Types of paper by process ==
- Acid-free paper
- Air-laid paper
- Blotting paper
- Blue paper
- Cardboard —
  - Cardstock
  - Corrugated fiberboard
  - Paperboard
  - Bristol board
- Coated paper
- Wax paper
- Crêpe paper
- Glassine
- Kraft paper
- Laid paper
- Ingres paper
- Momigami
- Onionskin
- Bible paper
- Seed paper
- Tissue paper
- Vulcanized fibre
- Leatheroid
- Wasli
- Wove paper

== Types of paper by use ==
- Parchment paper
- Photographic paper
- Wallpaper

=== Commercial use ===
- Bank paper
- Bond paper
- Butcher paper
- Electrical insulation paper
- Rolling paper
- Rosin paper
- Security paper
- Tar paper
- Thermal paper
- Transfer paper

=== Craft ===
Those for paper craft include:

- Construction paper
- Origami paper

=== Stationery ===
Those for stationery include:

- Contact paper
- Carbonless copy paper
- Inkjet paper
- Ruled paper
  - Graph paper
  - Genkō yōshi
- Special fine paper
- Tracing paper
- Writing paper

== See also ==
- List of art media
- Writing material
