= Mulberry paper =

Paper type originating in East Asia

Mulberry paper is a category of paper made from the bast fiber of mulberry tree bark, primarily the paper mulberry (Broussonetia papyrifera). Originating from East Asia, mulberry paper production spread along several routes including Silk Road trading, Austronesian expansion, and the transmission of Buddhism, fostering unique mulberry papermaking traditions across Asia and Oceania.

== Overview ==
Bark cloth has been made in China since at least 8,000 BCE. The oldest recorded reference to screened paper containing mulberry fibers is Cai Lun's rag paper, Cao Huo paper, from 105 CE. The technique of using new bast fibers was in production in China by the 3rd century AD and spread to north and east where the Moraceae plants were growing (Thymelaeaceae plants were also used).

Mulberry paper became the preferred writing material under the Song dynasty.

In manuscript paper, pure mulberry content usually indicates Chinese (or even more Eastern) origin, as this is where the mulberry trees could be found at a time: while plants were also growing in oases along the Silk Road, it was much more profitable to use these for cultivating the silkworms. As a result, in regions to the west of China, rag paper technology kept being used.

== List of mulberry papers ==
- Cai Huo paper
- Daluang
- Hanji
- Kōzogami
- Samarkand paper
- Saa paper
- Tapa cloth
- Xuan paper

== See also ==
- List of types of paper

== Sources ==
- Helman-Ważny, Agnieszka (2021-10-11). "A Tale of Papermaking along the Silk Road". Exploring Written Artefacts. De Gruyter. doi:10.1515/9783110753301-022. ISBN 978-3-11-075330-1.
