= Bark paper =

Bark paper may refer to:

- Amate, a form of paper manufactured in Mexico.
- Banana paper, a paper made from the bark of the banana plant.
- Dó paper, a paper traditionally produced in many villages in Vietnam.
- Korean paper, traditional handmade paper from Korea.
- Washi, a type of paper made in Japan.
