= Pulp and paper industry in Indonesia =

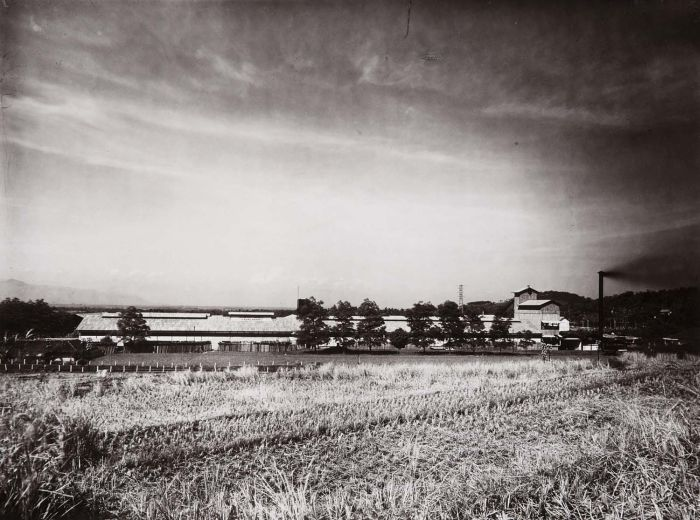
The Padalarang paper mill, the country's first modern paper factory, during the colonial era

Pulp and paper is a major industry in Indonesia, one of the largest producers of pulp and paper in Asia. The modern industry began in 1922 with the establishment of a paper mill during the Dutch colonial period and expanded rapidly between 1970 and the late 1990s to fulfil domestic demand and later as an export sector. Following the Asian financial crisis, the industry became more export-oriented and a major contributor to Indonesian exports. The industry controls around 10 million hectares of land as part of pulp plantations, with a major environmental footprint and accusations of violence.

== History ==
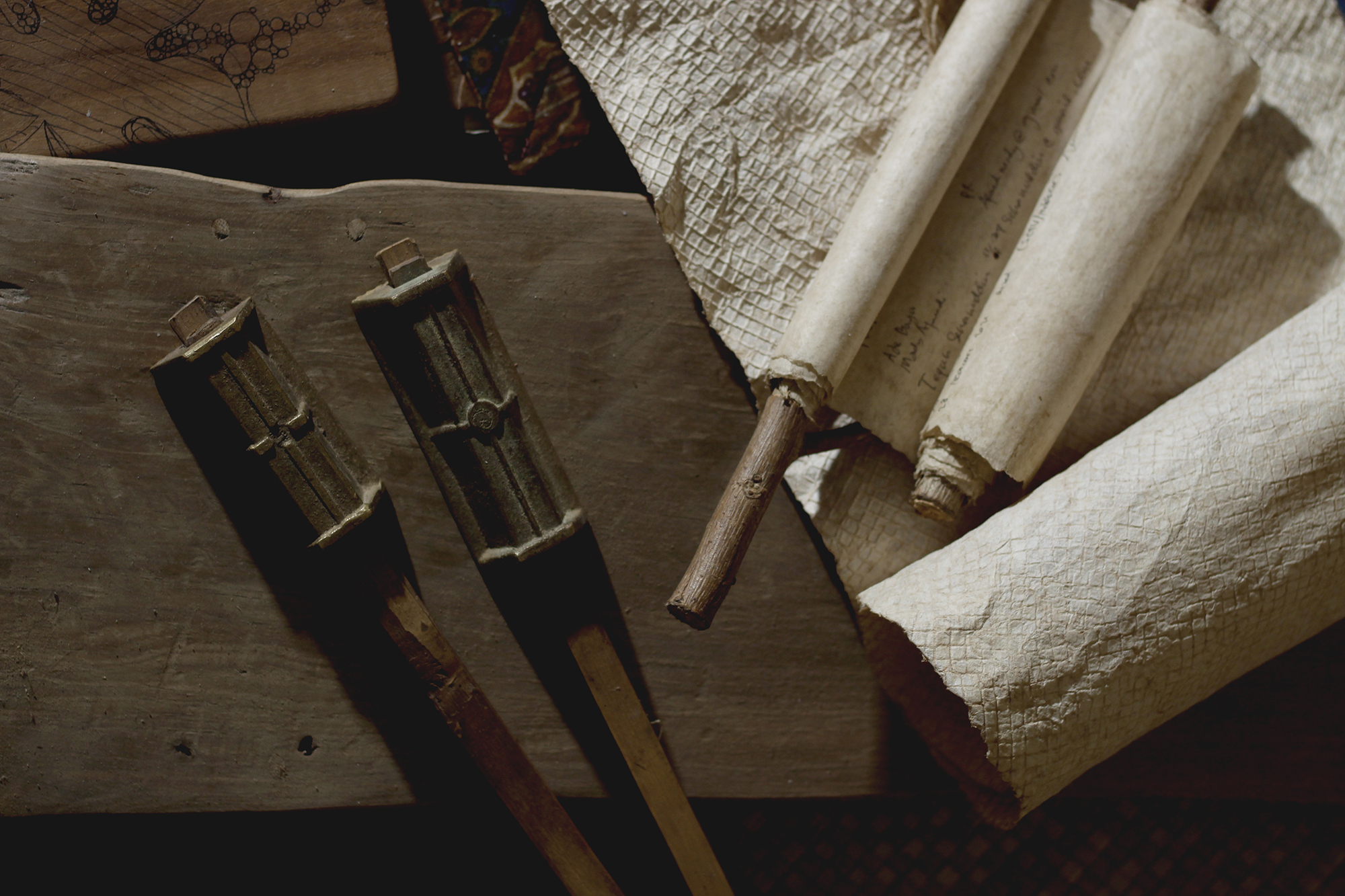
Traditional daluang paper

Before Dutch colonisation, a traditional form of paper known as daluang, made from the bark of the paper mulberry, had been produced in Java. The Dutch East India Company briefly operated a paper mill in the 17th century, but the mill was shut, and paper scarcity was commonplace. The company used daluang and Chinese paper as a substitute for European paper until the 19th century. Daluang production, centered in Ponorogo Regency, declined during the late colonial period and had essentially disappeared from large-scale production after the end of the Second World War.

The first modern paper mill in Indonesia, N.V. Papieren Fabriek, was opened on 22 May 1922 in Padalarang. It focused on manufacturing security paper for official documents, and the site was chosen due to its access to freshwater. The second factory, N.V. Papierfabriek Letjes in Probolinggo Regency, was opened in 1939 and commenced production in February 1940. The two mills were nationalised by the Indonesian government in the late 1950s, and five more mills were established across the country until 1970 as part of the ongoing import substitution policy. By 1984, the country had 31 paper mills with a production capacity of over 600,000 tons per year, compared to under 45,000 in 1970.

After 1984, the government switched to an export-oriented policy for pulp and paper production, granting concessions of forest land to producers and providing financial incentives such as tax breaks and subsidies. Consequently, production increased even further—pulp production increased 17-fold between 1984 and 1997, while paper production capacity increased almost 12-fold. The Asian financial crisis and the drop in domestic paper consumption made companies more export-oriented. As of 2021, most Indonesian pulp plantations were located in Sumatra or Kalimantan, although concessions have been granted for new plantations in Papua.

== Economic impact ==
In 2022, the Ministry of Industry estimated that Indonesia's pulp and paper industry employed 161,000 workers directly and 1.2 million workers indirectly. The industry had an installed production capacity of 12.1 million tonnes of pulp and 18.3 million tonnes of paper annually, the eighth largest in the world. The industry generated USD 7 billion in exports in 2018, 4% of all Indonesian exports. However, the export volume was dominated by a few companies—Sinar Mas Group and Royal Golden Eagle exported 95% of all pulp exports. Of the national pulp production, 42 per cent was processed into paper domestically, and 41 per cent was exported to China. In 2022, the industry contributed 6.2% to Indonesia's non-oil and gas exports, worth USD 7.5 billion.

== Environment and society ==
Within concessions granted to pulp producers, 170,000 hectares (420,000 acres) of forest were lost in 2015–2019. In 2022, the industry generated 86 million metric tons of CO2 equivalent, comparable to the emissions of New Zealand. This was primarily caused by deforestation and associated peat and forest fires. Conversion of forests and peatlands to pulp plantations in the country peaked in 2004 when over 200,000 hectares were converted.

According to WALHI, Indonesian pulp and paper companies collectively control over 10 million hectares (25 million acres) of land in concessions, with the largest groups Asia Pulp and Paper and APRIL controlling 2.6 million hectares (6.4 million acres) and 1 million hectares (2.5 million acres), respectively. WALHI has accused the two groups of engaging in covert violence and intimidation tactics as part of land grab campaigns against smallholders.
