= Streptomyces broussonetiae =

Scientific classification
- Domain: Bacteria
- Kingdom: Bacillati
- Phylum: Actinomycetota
- Class: Actinomycetia
- Order: Streptomycetales
- Family: Streptomycetaceae
- Genus: Streptomyces
- Species: S. broussonetiae

Binomial name
- Streptomyces broussonetiae Mo et al. 2020

Type strain
- T44

Species of bacterium

Streptomyces broussonetiae is a bacterium species from the genus of Streptomyces which has been isolated from rhizospheric soil of the plant Broussonetia papyrifera.

== See also ==
- List of Streptomyces species
