= Banana paper =

Paper made from banana plant fiber

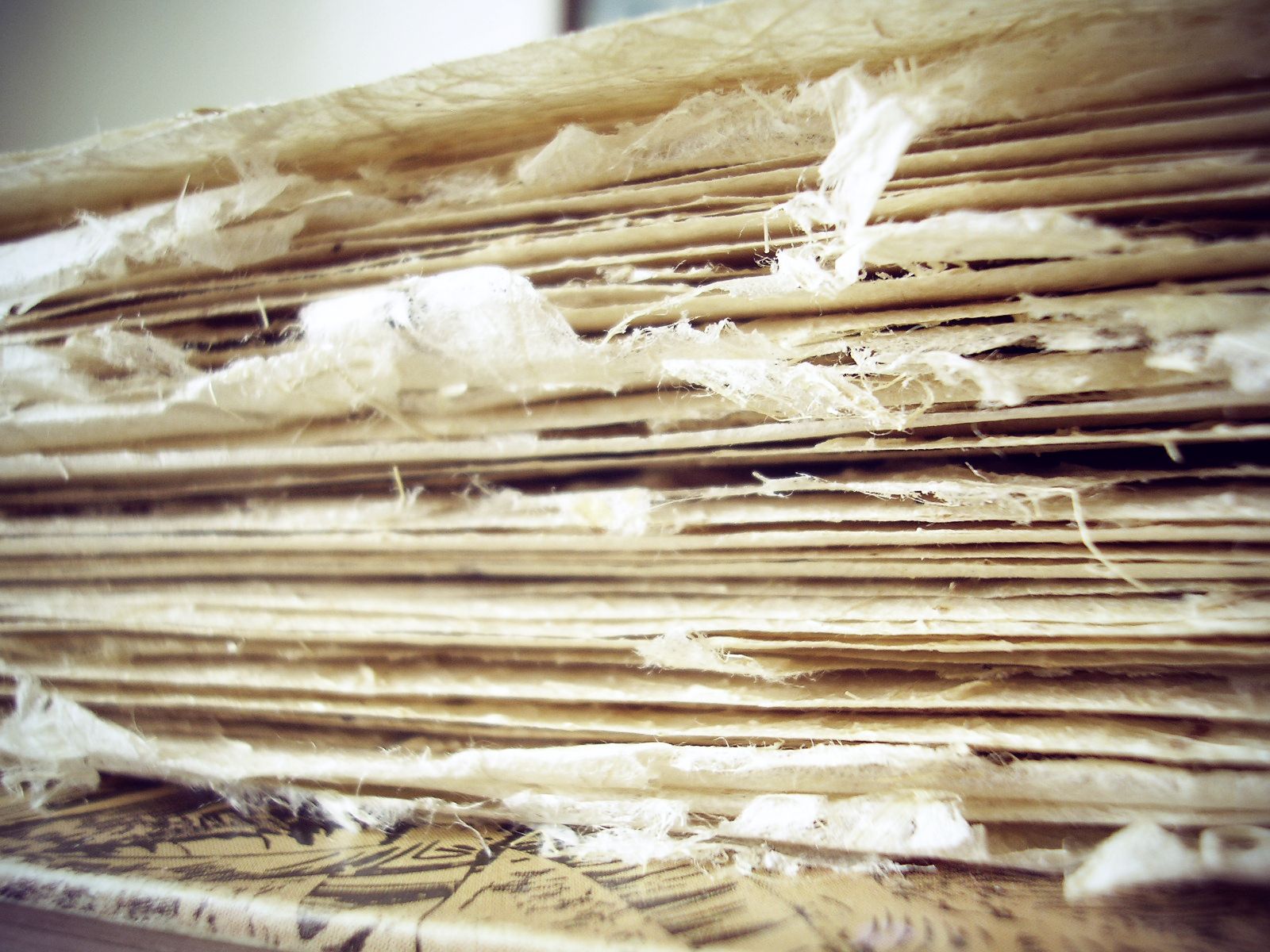
Banana plant paper

Banana paper is a type of paper made from the natural fibers of the banana plant.

== History ==
=== Basho paper ===
Basho paper (Japanese: Basho-shi, Okinawan: bashuukabi, basuuchi) is a banana fiber paper created in Ryukyu (today Okinawa, Japan). After the methods of mulberry paper production were brought to Ryukyu from Satsuma Province, Japan in the 16th century, fibers from the banana Musa basjoo (Japanese: 芭蕉, bashō) were substituted for the paper mulberry to create banana paper. First created in Naha in 1717, basho paper was used for everyday purposes until its decline in the mid-late 19th century. Basho papermaking was revived with the Mingei craft revival movement of the 20th century.

=== Manila paper ===
Invented in the 1830s in the United States, Manila paper was produced in the Philippines from discarded Abacá fiber, or "Manila hemp." True Manila hemp paper was discontinued by the late 19th century as pulpwood paper became dominant.

=== 20th century ===
Banana paper was first patented in the United States on March 16, 1912, by Charles M. Taylor and Howard Kay Cook. They both learned that cellulose fiber can be easily removed from the waste of the banana plant, and that the fiber is well adapted to making durable paper. Taylor and Cook applied for the patent on March 16, 1912. The application was granted on May 2, 1916, and they received a lifetime patent. The patent is now expired.

== Properties ==
Banana paper has a lower density, higher stiffness, higher disposability, higher renewability, and higher tensile strength compared to wood pulp paper.

Raw banana paper has a coarse surface due to the presence of hemicellulose, lignin, and other waxy components in the fiber. Hemicellulose is located between and within the cellulose fibrils and is incorporated into the cellulose structure. The fiber or pulp with high hemicellulose content has a high maximum tensile strength and a low maximum tear index. The cellulosic fibers enclose the outside of cellulose fibers, acting as natural binders.

Long wrapped fiber bundles are a key component of banana paper. Length is also a significant fiber property, as longer fibers contain more fiber joints. These fiber joints contribute to a stronger network of fibers. Long fiber manufactured papers usually have better strength properties than short fiber manufactured papers. Banana fiber can vary in weight and thickness depending on the specific part of the banana stem used. Sturdy, thick fibers can be taken from the outer sheaths, and softer fibers can be extracted from the inner sheaths.

== Manufacturing process ==
The paper can be handmade or produced by machinery. Both the handmade and machine processes have similar steps. First, banana stems are collected as they contain more than 4% fiber which can be used to manufacture banana paper. The fiber from the banana is removed and washed in order to eliminate natural resins that can decrease the strength and durability of the paper. The washed fibers are used to form a stronger fiber (agricultural fiber). Then, the process of pulping makes pulp used in the production of paper. This pulp is used to produce the post-consumer fiber and is mixed with the agricultural fiber. Lastly, the mixed fibers are either molded together by a deckle (a tool used for handmade processes of molding fibers) or a machine.

== Environmental impact ==
After bananas are harvested from plantations, the stems and trunks are usually discarded. However, these parts contain available sources of fibers. If the scrapped stems and trunks are utilized, this can lead to a decrease in synthetic fiber production. Synthetic fiber production requires extra energy, fertilizer, and chemicals. Banana paper does not require any chemicals to be used during manufacturing. Banana paper is also more durable and has a longer lifetime than conventional paper. Therefore, the manufacturing of banana paper does not add to environmental pollution. Banana paper reduces pollution by having lower disposal costs and less agricultural waste enter landfills and rivers. The production of banana paper uses less energy compared to traditional paper production as the traditional paper industry is one of the largest sources of energy consumption. Therefore, banana paper is less impactful on natural resources, such as forests.

== Future of industry ==
The global banana paper market size was approximately $490 million in 2021, and is projected to reach $760 million by 2031, according to Business Research Insights, a global market research firm. The banana paper market is expanding because of a growing number of uses for banana paper such as paper pens, business cards, greeting cards, notebooks, and other stationery items. The market is specifically expanding in Europe, North America, South America, and APAC (Asia-Pacific). The expanding banana paper market is further supported by its low production cost. Factors contributing to the low production cost include relatively inexpensive banana fiber extraction machinery and ease of operation of these machines by unskilled workers.
