= Samarkand paper =

Uzbek mulberry paper

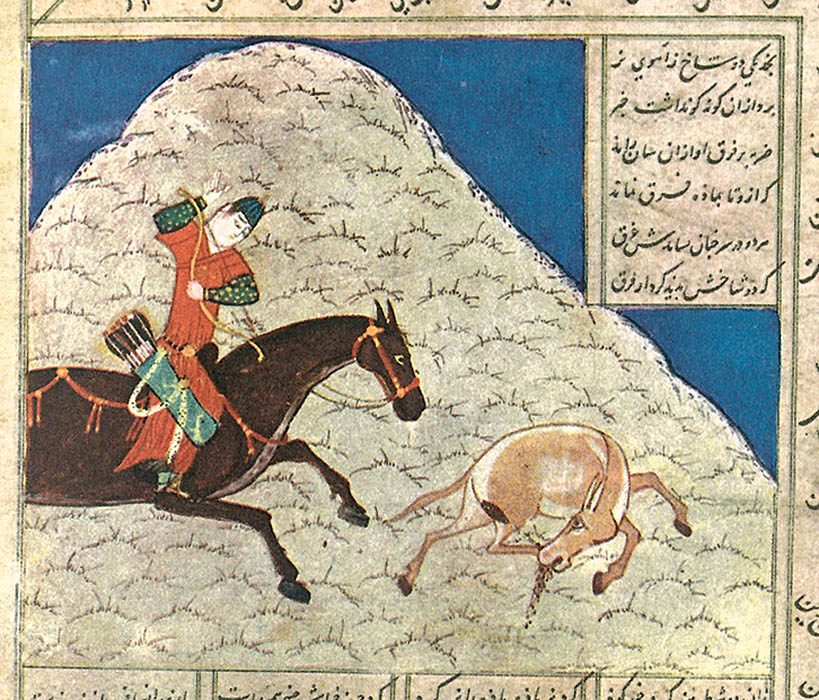
- Samarqand qog‘ozi
- Type: Mulberry paper; Handmade paper
- Material: Mulberry bark
- Place of origin: Samarkand, Uzbekistan
- Introduced: 4th-8th century CE
- Manufacturer: Uzbek people

Samarkand paper (Uzbek: Samarqand qog‘ozi), also known as silk paper, is a type of handmade mulberry paper from Samarkand, Uzbekistan. The paper saw wide use during the Islamic Golden Age, valued as a luxury good.

== History ==
Paper was introduced to the region through the Silk Road. Sogdian language paper letters to Samarkandi merchants have been dated to 313 CE. Chinese xuan paper was a trade good present in Samarkand by the early 8th century.

The Samarkand paper industry began around the 8th century, contemporaneous to Baghdad's paper mills. Samarkand paper supplanted papyrus and became preferred over parchment for Qurans and miniatures, for easier storage and lighter weight. Two varieties of Samarkand paper existed; rag paper, preferred for religious texts; and mulberry paper, for general use. A defining feature of Samarkand paper was the burnishing process, where a rock or shell smoothed the surface.

Production of Samarkand paper declined after the Russian conquest of Central Asia of the 19th century. It remains a niche industry today, involved in tourism.

=== Kashmiri paper ===
In the 15th century, Zayn al-Abidin the Great of the Kashmir Sultanate granted jagirs to Samarkandi papermakers to begin a papermaking industry. The paper from Kashmir became known as koshur kagaz, or Kashmiri paper.

=== Battle of Talas origin ===
A popular theory for the introduction of paper to Samarkand is the capture of Chinese papermakers from the Tang dynasty by the Abbasids in the Battle of Talas, 751 CE. The origin is likely apocryphal, given significant archaeological findings of paper in the region that predate the battle.

== Production ==
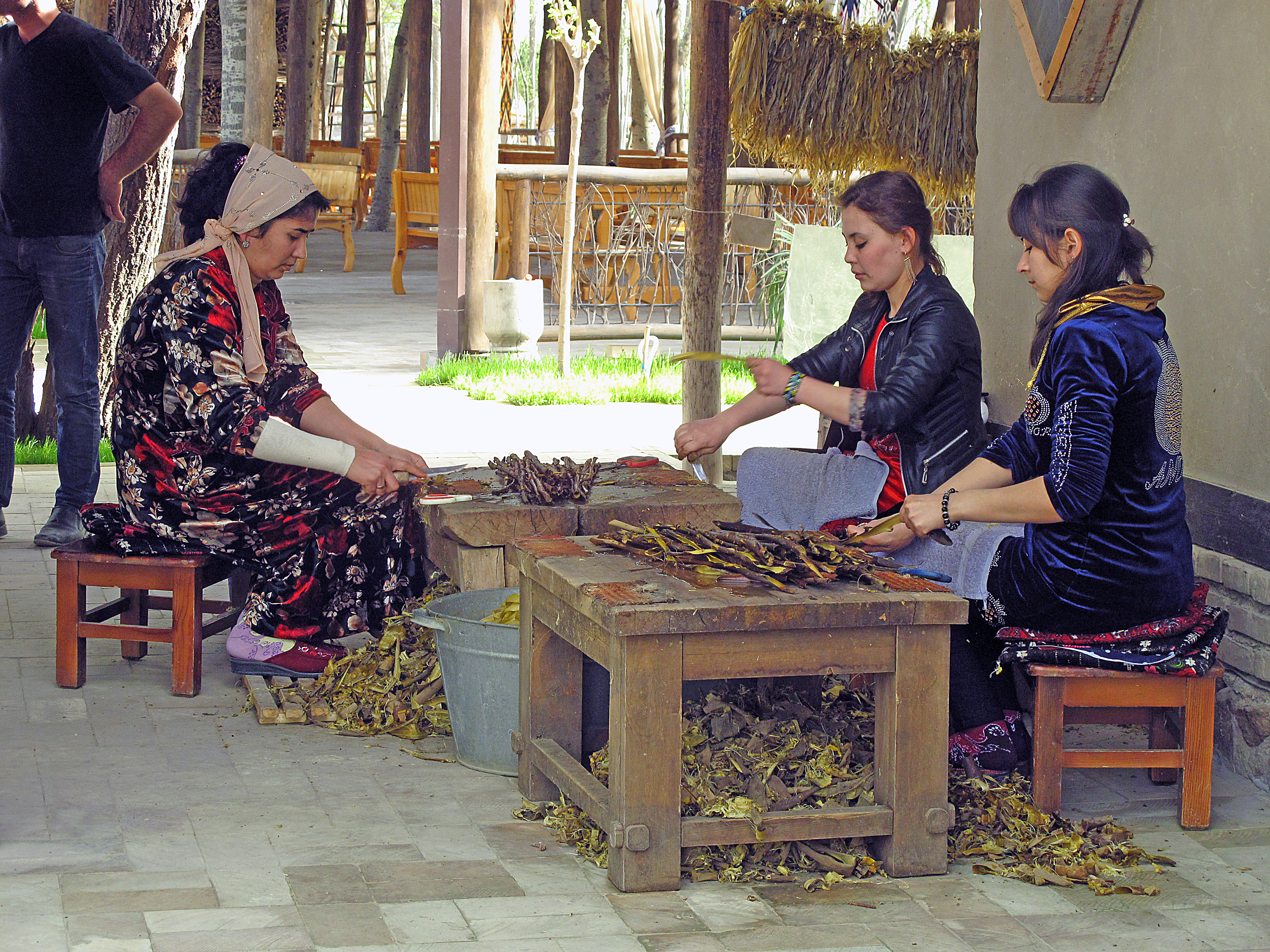
Samarkandi paper mill workers peeling mulberry bark. In background, drying bark

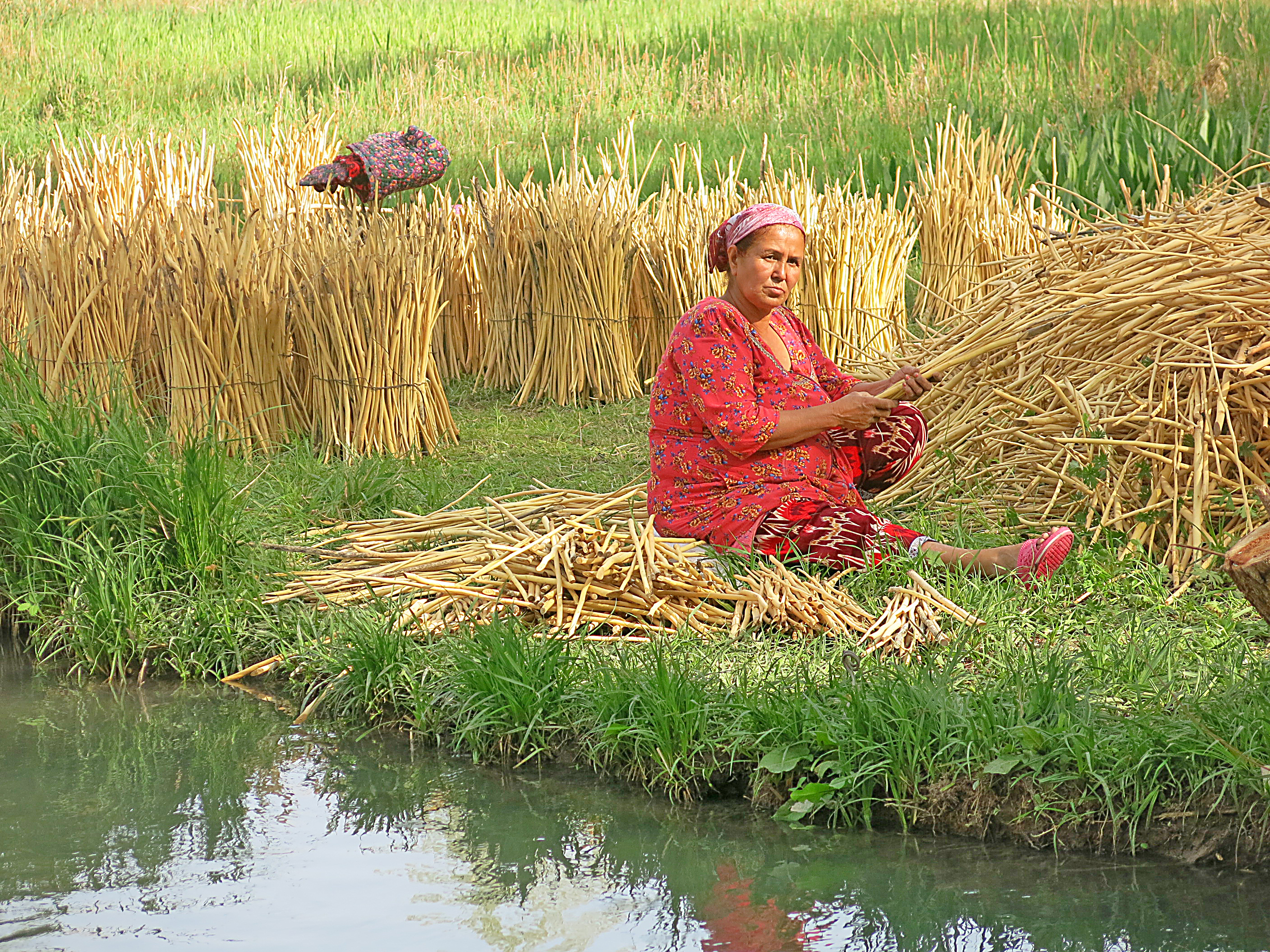
Peeled mulberry branches bundled for drying

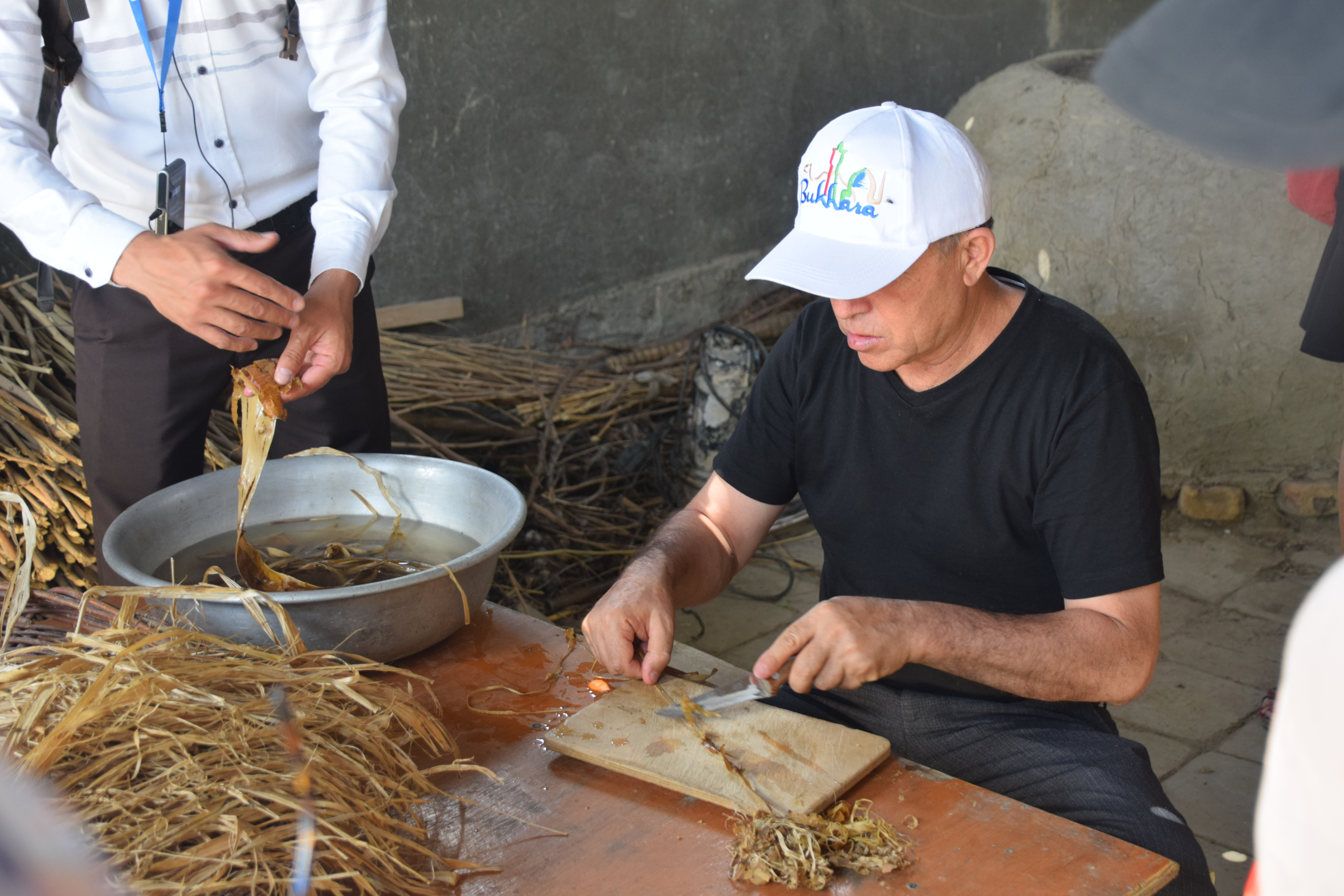
Separating soaked bark

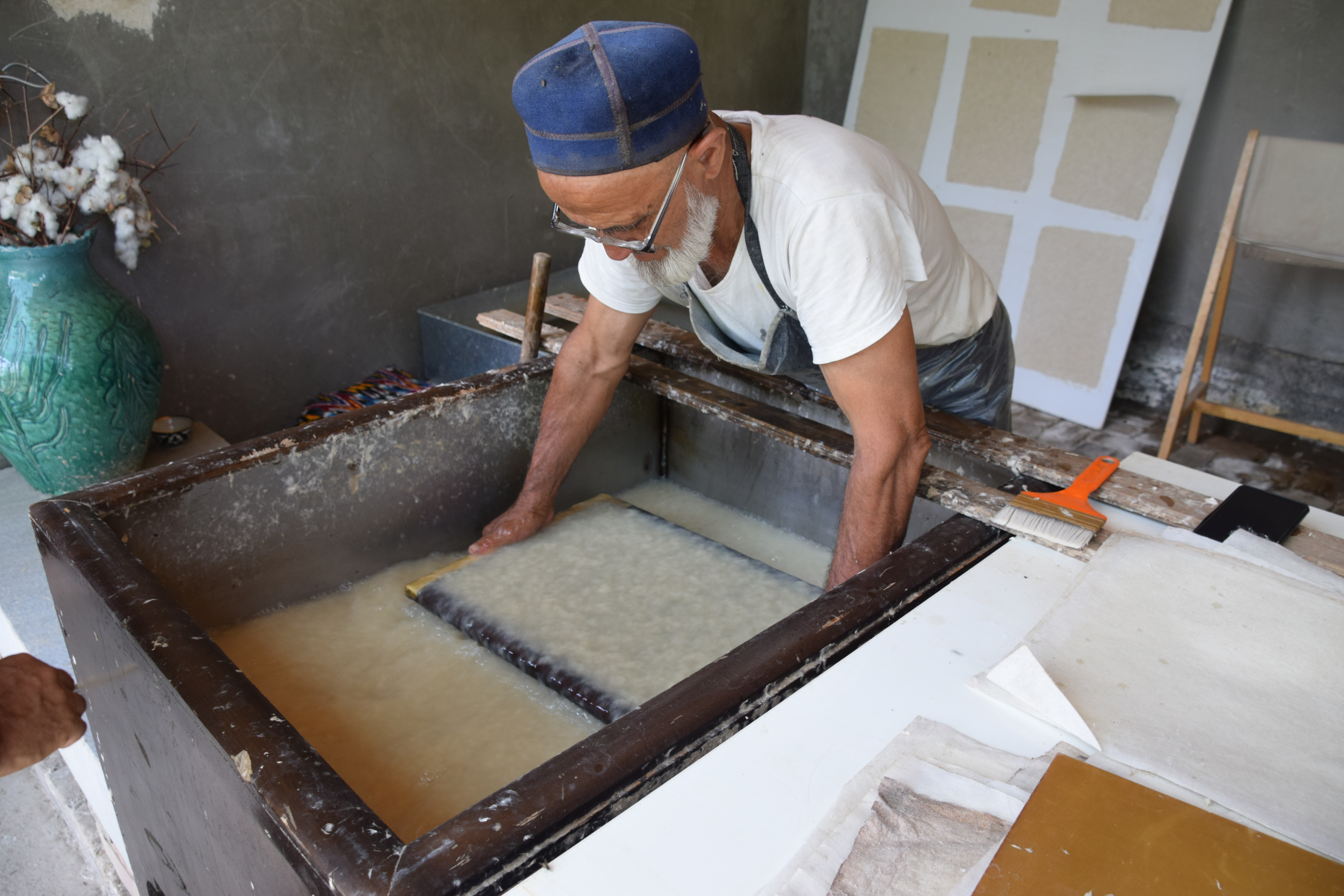
Screening pulp slurry. In background, drying sheets

Modern Samarkand paper is made using the inner bark of young mulberry branches. The branches are boiled so the bark can be removed and the inner bast fiber split off. The bast is then beaten into a pulp, sieved, burnished and dried. The final paper is smooth and off-white.

== See also ==
- Islamic calligraphy
- Islamic miniature
- Xuan paper
- Washi
- List of types of paper
