= Kashmiri paper =

Kashmiri handmade paper

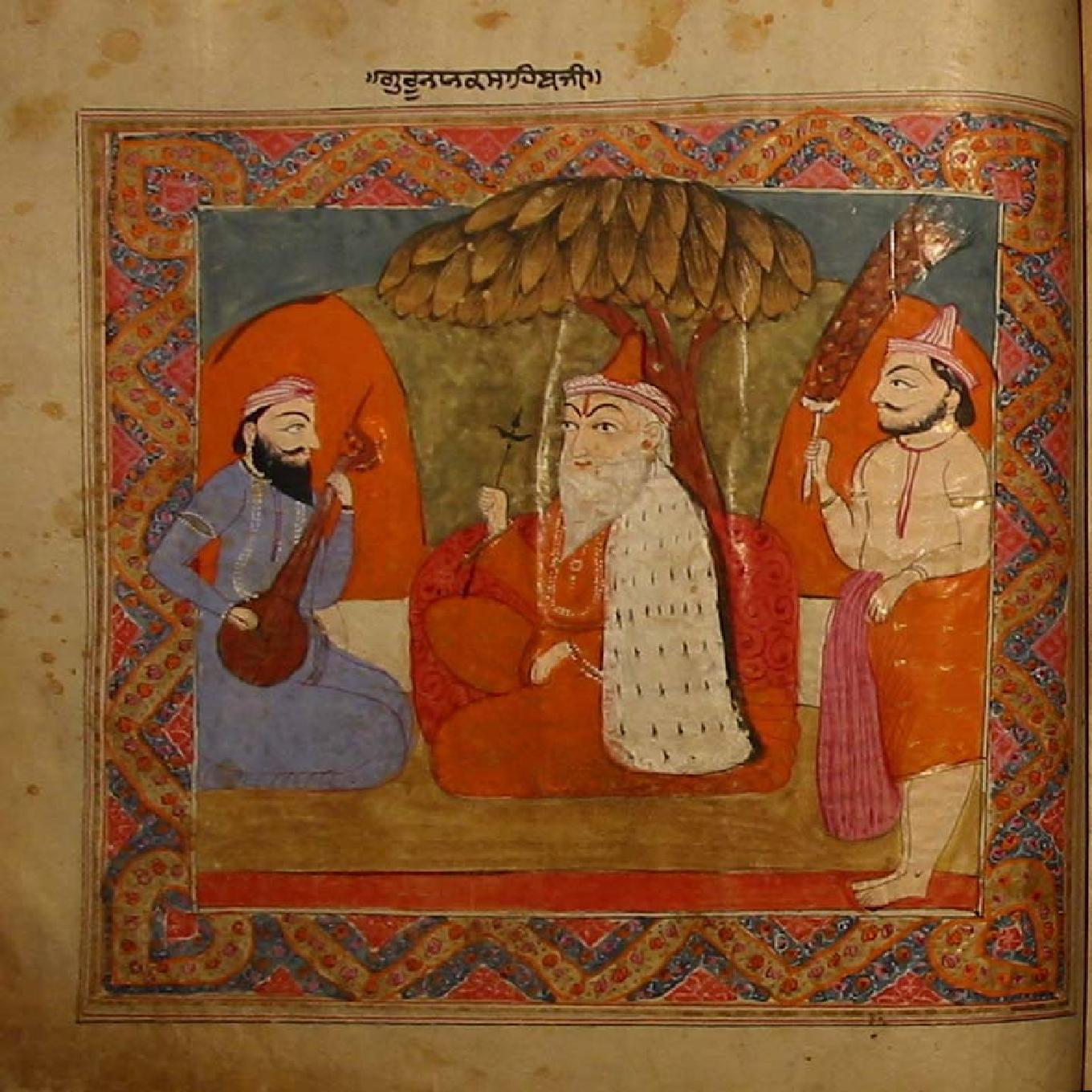
- Koshur kagaz
- Type: Handmade paper
- Material: Rags, hemp, sunn hemp
- Place of origin: Kashmir
- Introduced: 15th century
- Manufacturer: Kashmiri people

Kashmiri paper (Kashmiri: Koshur kagaz) is a handmade paper from Kashmir. Introduced in the 15th century, the paper was renowned for its white color, smooth texture and lack of imperfections, features uncommon before the paper machine.

== History ==
In the 15th century in the Kashmir Sultanate, Zayn al-Abidin the Great granted jagirs to Samarkand papermakers to establish a domestic paper industry. Other Northwestern South Asian papermakers, or kághazis, claimed lineage from Kashmiri papermaking for prestige, such as the kághazis of Sialkot. Kághazis were majority Muslims as rag-picking was taboo among Hindus. By the 19th century, kághazis across the Indian subcontinent struggled to compete against the rise of jail industry, imported paper and mechanization.

Kashmiri paper saw some resurgence with the 20th century Swadeshi movement, but has largely remained a niche industry.

== Production ==
Kashmiri paper is a rag and hemp-based paper. Sunn hemp was sometimes favored over true hemp. Constituent fibers are beaten, retted in lye, then sun-bleached into pulp cakes. The cakes are dissolved into a slurry, screened with a deckle in two layers, then pasted on a wall to dry. The dried sheets are sized in a three-part process: first, the paper is abraded; second, rice flour is worked into the paper; and finally, the surface is burnished. The sizing process can be repeated multiple times for higher grade, glossier finishes.

== See also ==
- Kashmir papier-mâché
- Samarkand paper
- Lokta paper
