= Islamic miniature =

Small Islamic paintings on paper

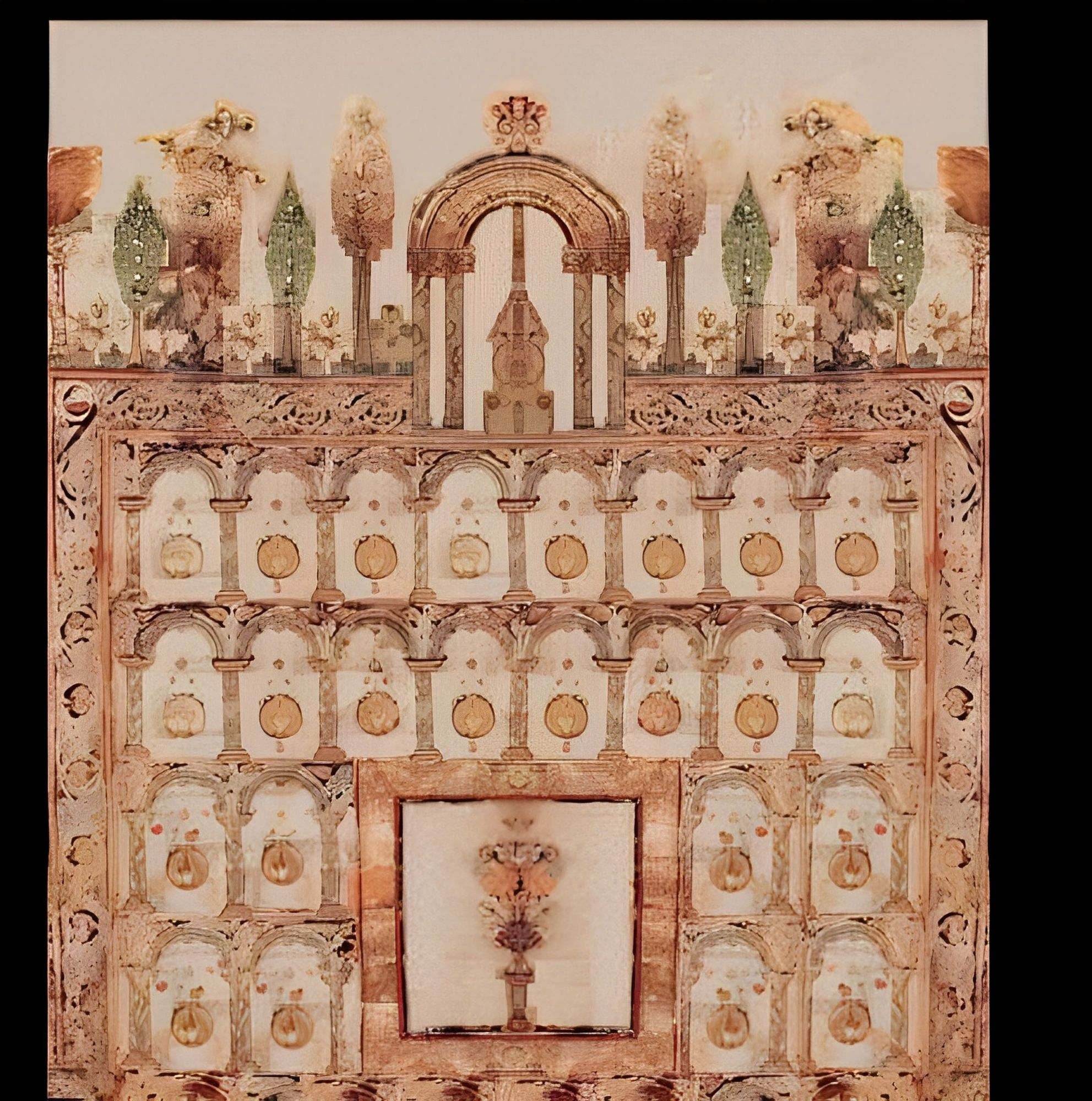
A miniature from the Umayyad period portraying a mosque and a garden c. 690 AD, from the Great Mosque of Sanaa's manuscripts

Islamic miniatures are small paintings on paper, usually book or manuscript illustrations but also sometimes separate artworks, intended for muraqqa albums. The earliest examples date from around 1000, with a flourishing of the artform from around 1200. The field is divided by scholars into four types, Arabic, Persian, Mughal (Indian), Ottoman (Turkish).

As in the art history of Europe, "miniature" is generally reserved for images including people, with abstract or geometrical decorative schemes on the pages of books called "illumination". These are much more common, and less sensitive, often found in grand copies of the Quran, as for example in Ottoman illumination.

== History ==
For a long time, Islamic art from outside the Persianate world was considered aniconic in academic research. Known pictures including human figures from the milieu of Muslim courts have been described as an "aberration" by the early 20th-century writer Sir Thomas Arnold (d. 1930). He asserted that such images only belong to a later Persianate and Turkic cultural period. However, figurative arts existed since the formative stage of Islam. Small miniatures were not seen in public, as they were kept in the libraries or houses of the elites. However the depiction of Muhammad himself remained something to be approached with care, and various conventions such as masks and clouds were adopted to at least hide his face; sometimes miniatures were adusted at a later period to include this.

Figurative arts enjoyed prestige among both orthodox Sunni circles as well as Shia Muslims of the early Islamic period. They have been prominent among Arabic speaking caliphates of Baghdad, Cairo, and Cordova, inspired by Sasanid and Byzantine models. Furthermore, even later non-Arabic rulers, ordering figurative arts in the 14th-17th century, were zealous enforcers of the laws of the Sharia.

It has been claimed that the rejection of figurative arts at a later stage may be better explained as an attempt to hide the subjugation of Arabian culture by the Ottomans rather than religious prohibition.

== See also ==
- Arabic miniature
- Ottoman miniature
- Persian miniature
- Mughal miniature
