= Daluang paper =

Indonesian beaten bark paper

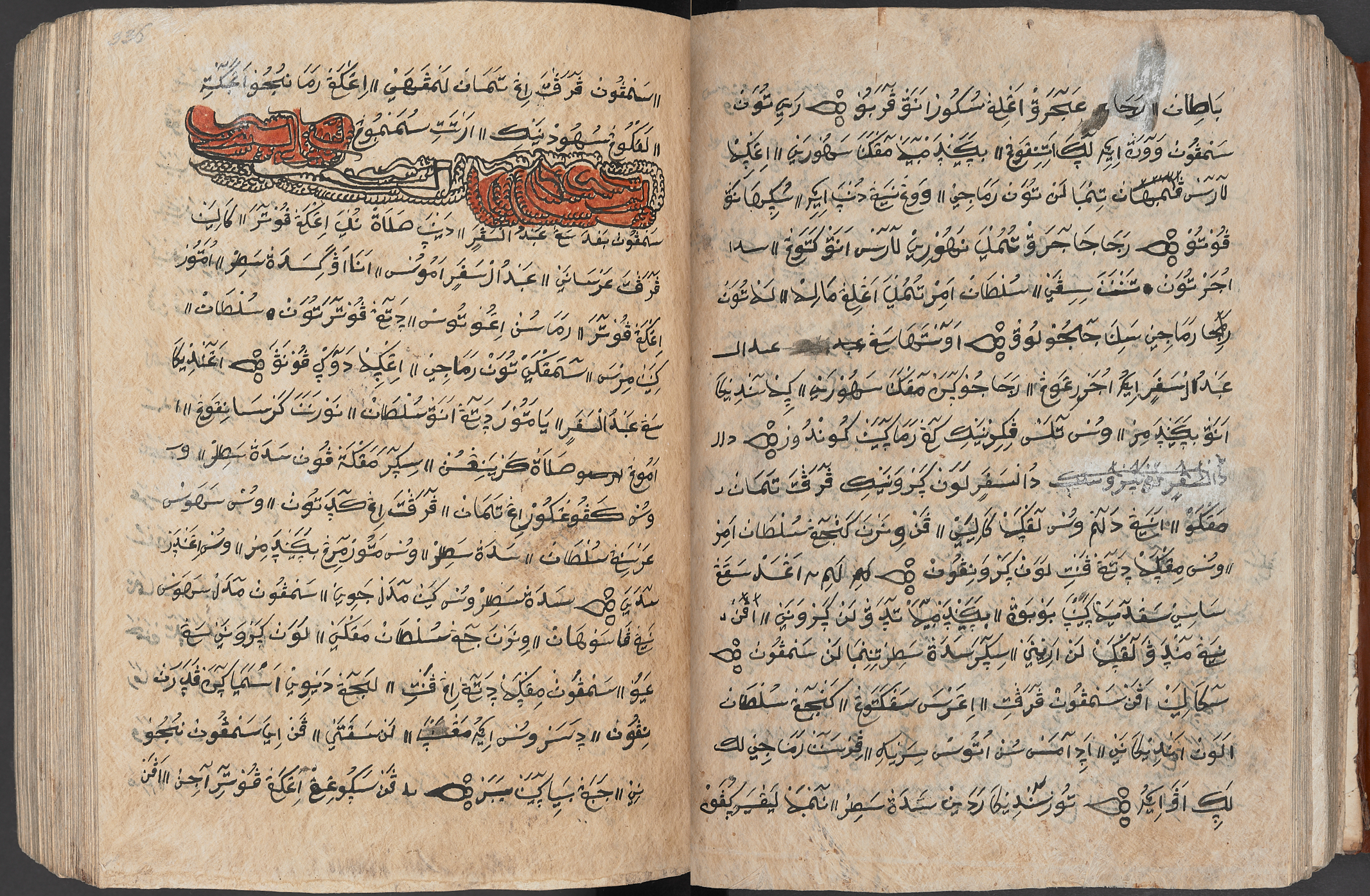
- Menak Amir Hamza, 18th century
- Type: Handmade paper
- Material: Paper mulberry bark
- Production method: Beaten bark
- Place of origin: Java, Madura, Lesser Sunda Islands

Daluang paper (Javanese: dluwang or dlancang), also known as gedog paper or Ponorogo paper, is a variety of paper (Note: Daluang does not fit a definition of paper based on a required material of macerated pulp. Daluang is still frequently referred to as and used as a kind of paper.) indigenous to Java, Madura, and the Lesser Sunda Islands. Made from beaten paper mulberry bark, it is varyingly considered a close relative to or a type of tapa cloth or barkcloth.

== History ==
Paper mulberry trees from Indonesia are genetically descended from trees in Taiwan, suggesting their propagation according to the Out of Taiwan theory. Bark beaters dating to the Neolithic period have been found in Java.

Daluang is mentioned multiple times in the 9th century Kakawin Ramayana. The epic details that daluang clothing was worn by pandits. The paper continued to be used as a niche clothing material into the 16th and 17th centuries. By the 18th century, daluang was used as a material of the ketu, the traditional pedanda crown.

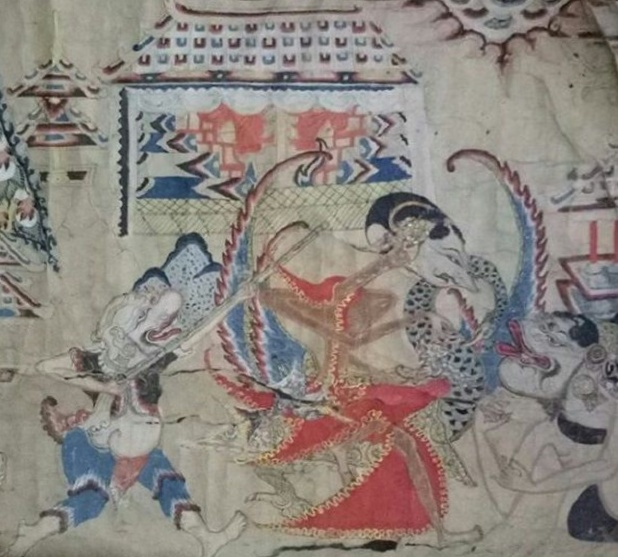
Wayang beber on daluang

=== Wayang beber ===
By the 14th century in Majapahit, the art of wayang beber emerged, centering on scrolls of daluang. The scroll would be slowly unrolled between two rods, progressing through panels of a story.

=== Modern era ===
After the late 16th century spread of Islam to Java, daluang became a favored writing material for Islamic Javanese literature versus palm-leaf lontar, as daluang better handled Pegon script; for example, the 1,520-folio Menak Amir Hamza was written on daluang.

During Company rule in the Dutch East Indies, VOC agents struggled to maintain paper supplies; to compensate, daluang was substituted for envelopes and wrapping paper. The Dutch East Indies administration continued to use daluang in this way. While daluang did see use during the Japanese occupation of the Dutch East Indies as an ersatz clothing material, by the post-World War II era, production was supplanted by industrial pulpwood paper.

Daluang is a minor traditional craft today. The Indonesian Ministry of Education and Culture recognized daluang as intangible cultural heritage in 2014. Local artisans produce daluang for their own traditional handicrafts such as wayang beber.

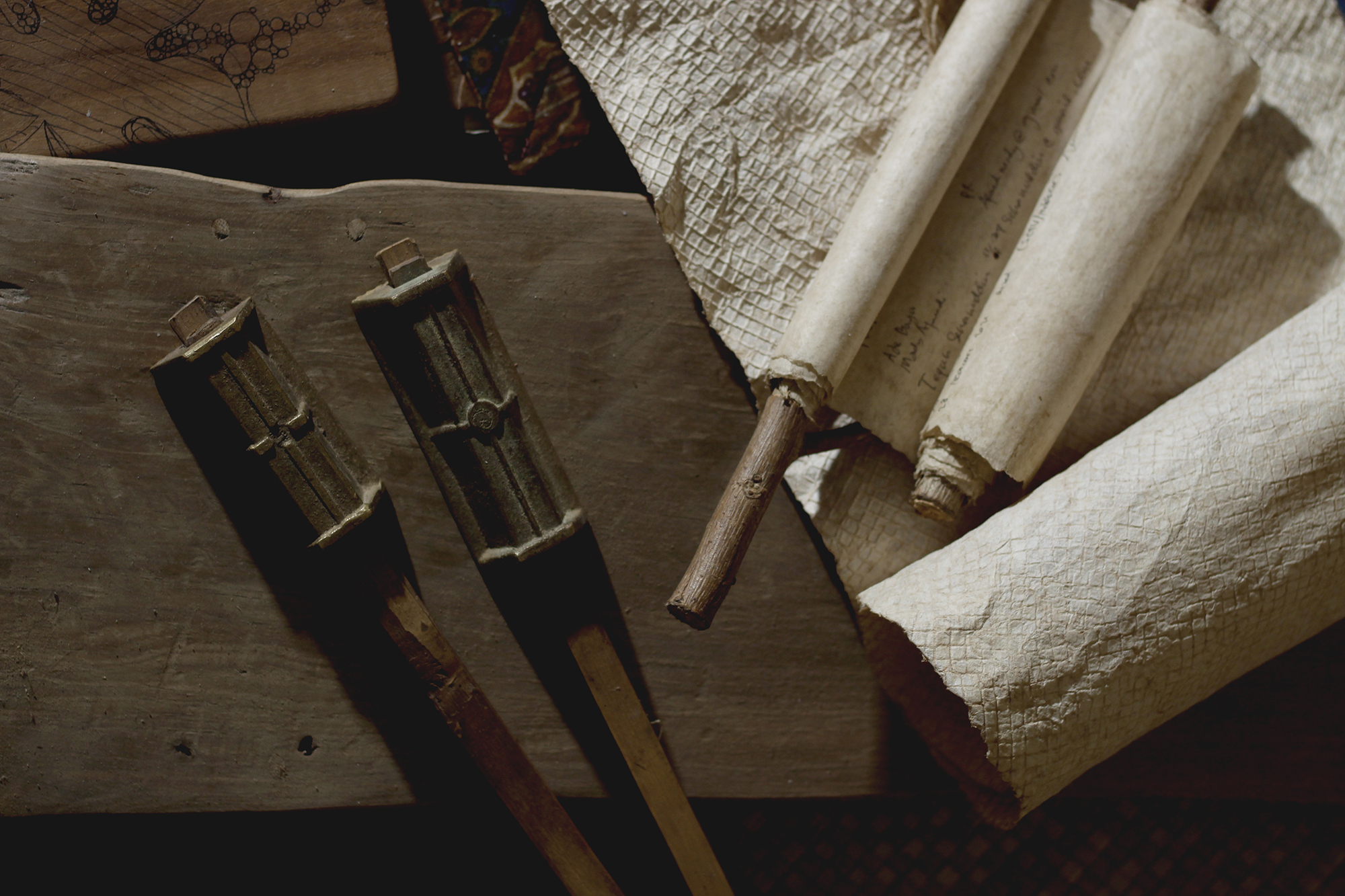
Daluang with brass pamepeuh bark beaters

== Production and uses ==
Daluang is made from paper mulberry bark (Note: Other names: Sundanese: saeh; Javanese: glugu or galugu; Madurese: dhalubang or dhulubang; Kambera: kembala.). The outer bark is separated from the inner bast fiber, washed, and dried. The dried bast is then soaked before pounding with specialized bark pounders (pamepeuh). The paper is flipped multiple times during pounding to thin the bark by 2-3 times. The wet paper can be submerged and further manipulated as needed before drying on a banana tree. The paper is finalized by burnishing to smooth the texture; burnishing tools include shells, rattan, and coconut shells.

== Rumors of cassava paper ==
European academics searching for 'true' indigenous paper, i.e. pulp-screened paper, followed rumors of cassava paper; names include kertas telo and kertas merang merang bagor. These rumors were in actuality largely Chinese paper introduced to the area through trading.

== See also ==
- Barkcloth
- Tapa cloth
- Washi
- Korean paper
- Samarkand paper
