= Seed paper =

Type of handmade paper

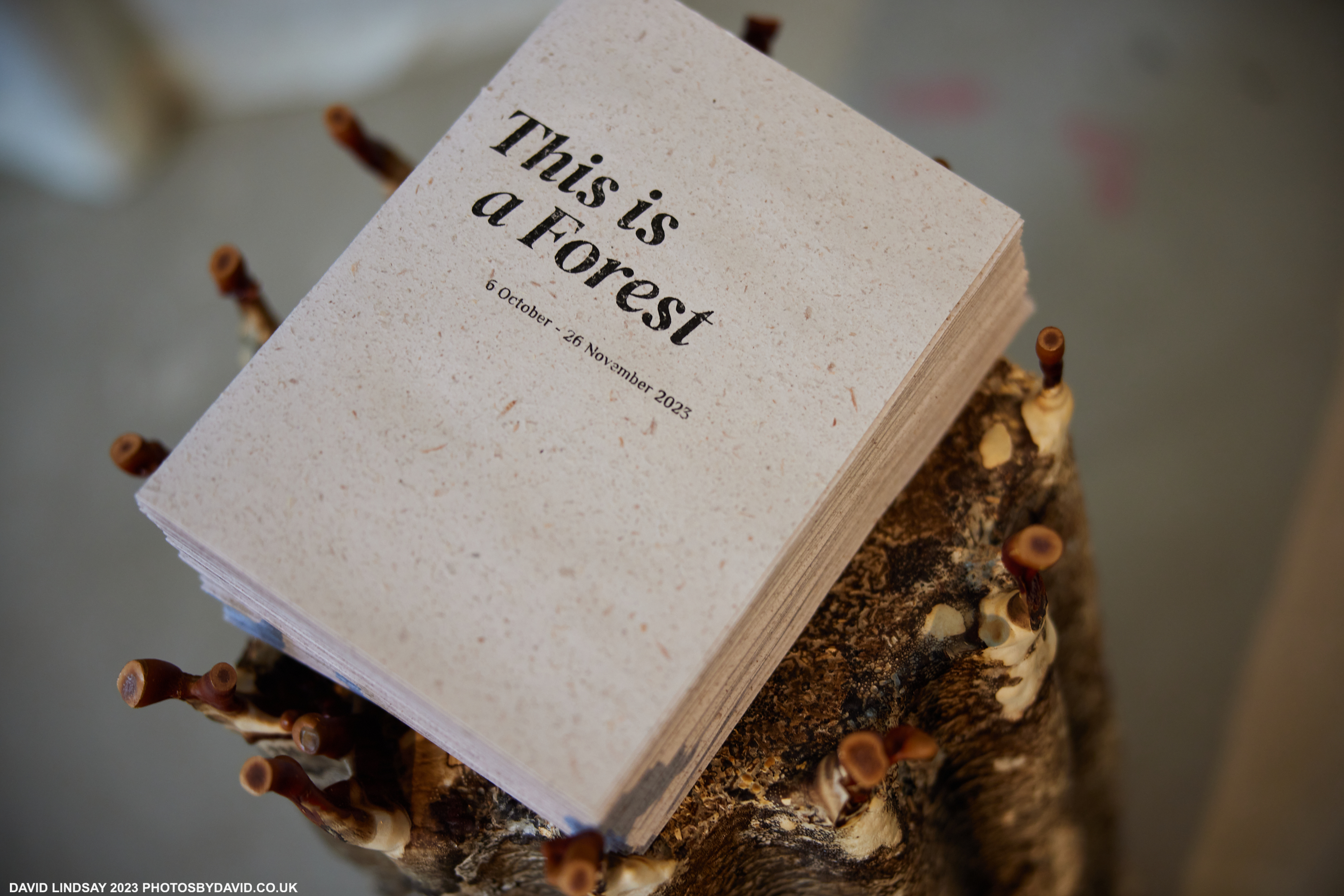
Leaflets printed onto seed paper

Seed paper is a type of paper that includes any number of different plant seeds, which can still germinate and sprout after the papermaking process. Papermakers have been producing paper including seeds in the United States since 1941, but international papermakers have practiced seed inclusion in the paper for centuries. A wide variety of flower, vegetable, and tree seeds can also be used in seed paper for decorative effect.

== Description ==
Seed paper is a type of paper that includes any number of different plant seeds. If prepared into plantable seed paper (or sprouting seed paper), the seeds themselves can still germinate after the papermaking process and they can sprout when the paper is planted in soil. It can be made at home.

== History ==
Papermakers have been producing paper including seeds in the United States since 1941, but international papermakers have practiced seed inclusion in the paper for centuries. Seed paper has traditionally been handmade in smaller batches and is often made-to-order for clients.

Sprouting seed paper has enjoyed a resurgence of popularity in the United States recently.

== Use ==
Seed paper can be used for stationery, cards, invitations, decorative wraps, bags, and packaging.

=== Decoration ===
A wide variety of flower, vegetable, and tree seeds can also be used in seed paper for decorative effect. The seeds and flowers in the paper can create decorative effects and colors. Depending on the type of seed and the process used, different colors, thickness, and patterns can be created.

=== Bags ===
Seed paper may be fashioned into seed paper bags, which are biodegradable alternatives to plastic bags.
