= Korean paper =

Traditional Korean craft

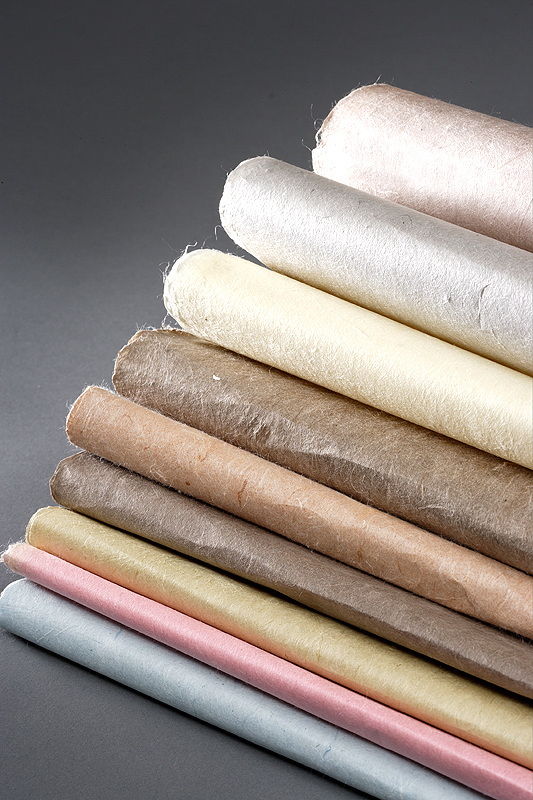

Korean name
- Hangul: 한지
- Hanja: 韓紙
- RR: hanji
- MR: hanji

Korean paper or hanji (Korean: 한지) is traditional handmade paper from Korea. Hanji is made from the inner bark of the paper mulberry (Broussonetia papyrifera; 닥; dak), a tree native to Korea that grows well on its rocky mountainsides. Another crucial material used in its creation is the mucilage that oozes from the roots of Abelmoschus manihot. This substance helps suspend the individual fibers in water.

Traditional hanji is made in laminated sheets using the we bal method (a sheet formation technique), which allows for multi-directional grain. The process of creating hanji also employs dochim, a method of pounding finished sheets to compact fibers and lessen ink bleed.

== History ==
=== Ancient ===
Papermaking arrived in Korea not long after its beginnings in China. Its origins in Korea are believed to fall somewhere between the 3rd century and the end of the 6th century. At first, paper was made crudely out of hemp and ramie scraps (마지; maji). In 1931, a piece of hanji was found at an archeological dig at a tomb site from the Lelang period (108 BCE–313 CE).

During the Three Kingdoms period (57 BCE–668 CE), each kingdom used paper to record their official histories. In 610, The Buddhist monk Damjing whom Goguryeo presented to Japan was able to make the production method of paper and ink. The world's oldest surviving wood block print is the Buddhist Dharani Sutra called the Pure Light Dharani Sutra. Listed as Korea's National Treasure No. 126, it was printed onto hanji c. 704 and is still in good condition, bearing the papermaker's name. Paper crafts were also developed in the Three Kingdoms period, such as kites and other household items, and continued to flourish as hanji production increased. Silla Kingdom, one of the Three Kingdoms, settled the paper industry deeply into Korean culture, and called it gyerimji.

=== Goryeo period ===
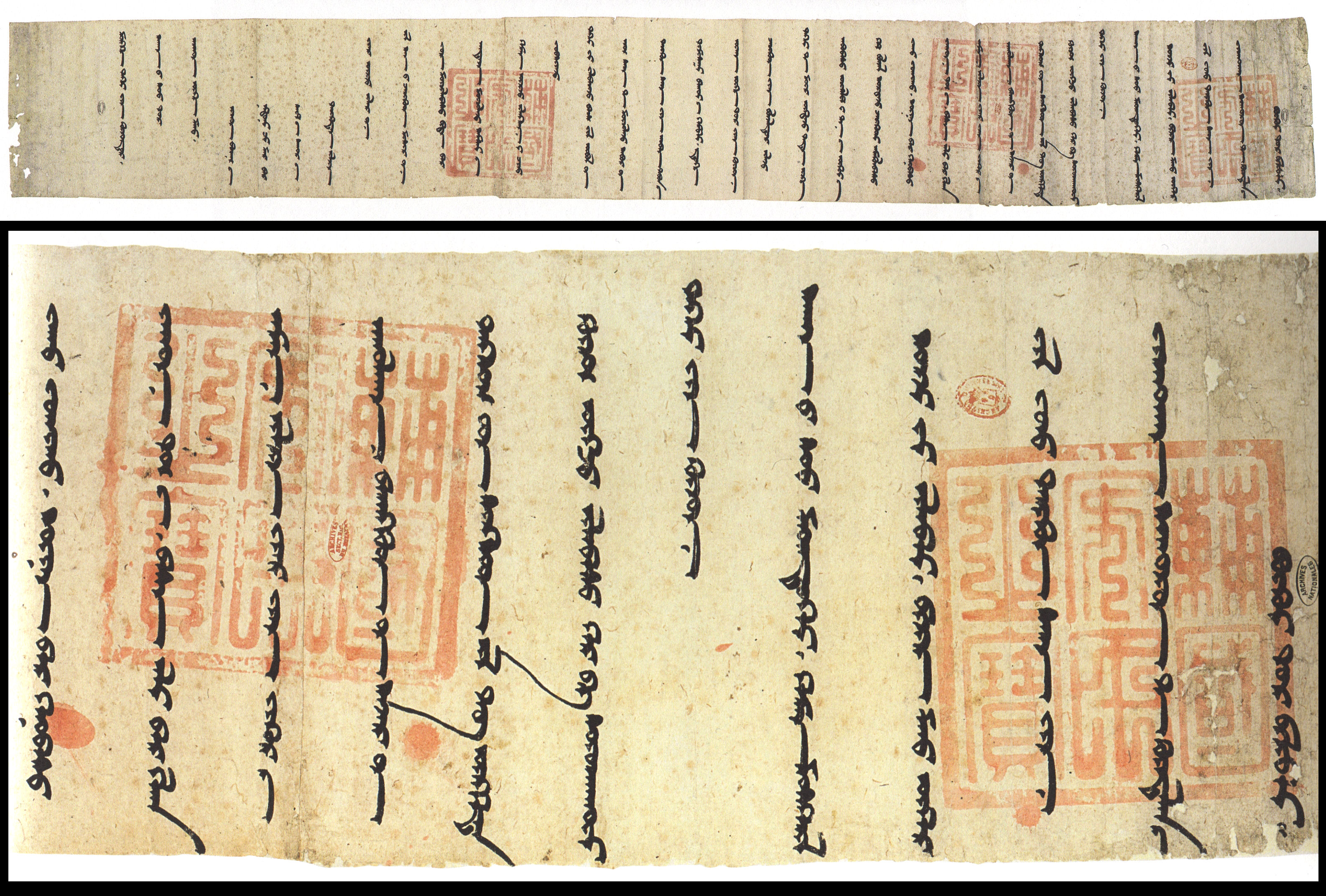
1289 letter of 4th ilkhan Arghun to Philip the Fair, in Mongolian language and classical Mongolian script, with detail of the introduction. The letter was remitted to the French king by Buscarel of Gisolfe. The seal is that of the Great Khan, with Chinese Script: “輔國安民之寶”, which means "Seal of the upholder of the State and the purveyor of peace to the People". The paper is Korean manufacture, in the Goryeo period. 182x25 cm. French National Archives.

Hanji's golden age peaked in the Goryeo period (918–1392), which saw the rise in quality and use of hanji in conjunction with printmaking. Paper was used to make money, Buddhist texts, and medical and history books. The government encouraged dak cultivation and paper production, and dak was planted countrywide in the 12th century. Often called Goryeoji, hanji became famous in Asia for its strength and luster, and became a heavy trade item to China.

The Goryeo period is famous for two major landmarks in Korean printmaking and paper history. One was the carving of the Tripitaka Koreana onto over 80,000 wooden blocks, which contain no errors and are still extant in their original home at Haeinsa, a Buddhist temple in South Gyeongsang Province. It was carved twice, due to its destruction by Mongol invasions in 1232; the final version was completed in 1251. The second accomplishment was the printing in 1377 of Jikji, a guide for students of Buddhism, and the world's oldest extant book printed using metal movable type. Printed onto hanji, it is housed today in the National Library of France, and displays proof of movable metal type well before Gutenberg's time.

=== Joseon period ===
The beginning of the Joseon period (1392–1910) saw continued flourishing of the hanji industry as paper permeated daily lives of Koreans through books, household items, and popular items such as fans and tobacco pouches. From the start of the Joseon period in an effort to promote austerity, artificial flowers that had been made from wax and silk were replaced by paper versions. Later, paper flowers were also used to replace other versions for Buddhist rites and festivals.

Variations of hanji became common, such as colored paper, and paper made from mixed fibers including pine bark, rice straw, and bamboo. This came partly from a need to find new materials beyond dak due to the huge demand for books. The government created an administrative agency devoted to paper production, and also supplied troops with paper armor, which was waterproof, a good insulator, and provided protection against arrows and swords. Oiled hanji was used to make greenhouses c. 1450 because the paper, made of natural materials, could control temperature, humidity, and light effectively. However, the Joseon government pressured Buddhist monks to increase their production of hanji that they were already making for Buddhist scriptures since the 15th century.

As the final blow to hanji, western methods of paper mass production were introduced in 1884.

=== After liberation ===
In the 1970s, the New Village Movement that aimed to modernize Korea rapidly also led to further decimation of the hanji industry, as it eradicated traditional straw-thatched homes that used hanji to cover floors, walls, ceilings, windows, and doors. The most recent threat to the Korean paper industry is the rise of inexpensive paper made in China, where labor costs and overhead are significantly lower than in Korea.

As of 2009, twenty-six hanji mills remain operational in South Korea. They make hanji for artists, calligraphers, conservators, temples, and laypeople.

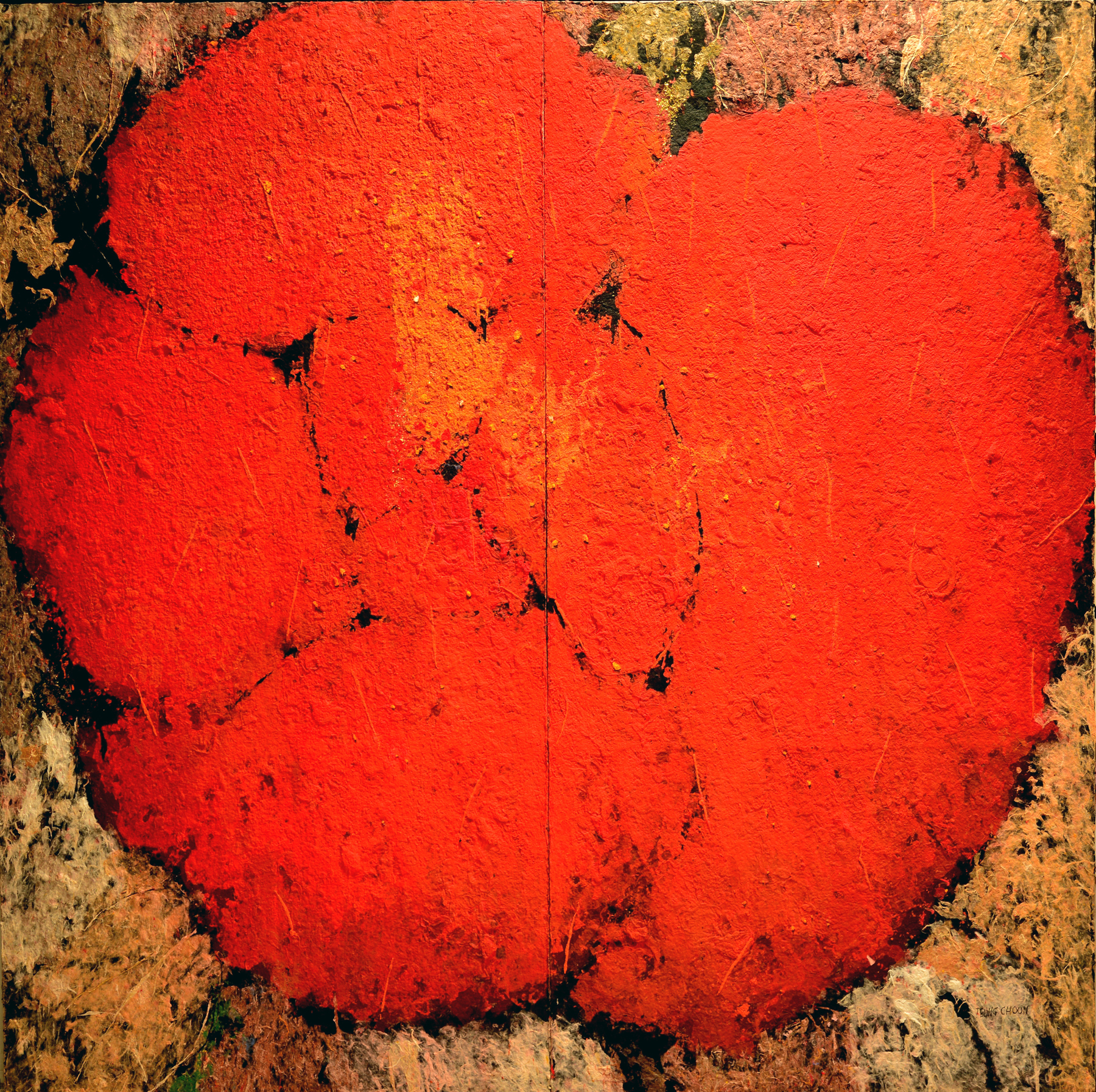
Example of Modern Korean Paper Art

An example of modern Hanji Paper art, a unique alchemy of ancient Asian techniques and modern Western imagery by the YUNS can be seen here.

== Manufacturing process ==
=== Materials ===
The two materials mainly used when making hanji is the paper mulberry (called dak in Korean) and the plant formerly known as hibiscus, known in Korea as hwang chok kyu. More than six steps of the manufacturing process deal with mending and preparing these two materials.

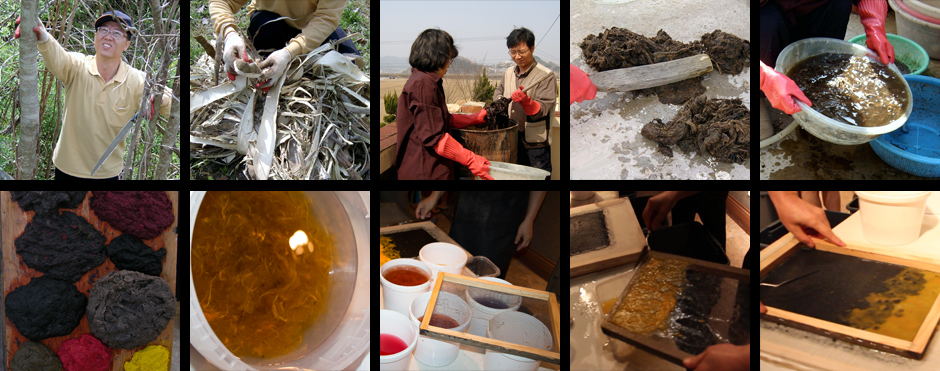
YUN creating Hanji Paper Artwork - The Process: bark collection to paper sheet.

The paper mulberry is a commonly grown plant in Asia, growing in the feet of mountains that gets a lot of sunlight, reaching a growth height of usually 3 meters. In Korean history, people used the fibers from these trees to make clothes, and they began to use it as the source for paper during the Goryeo dynasty. The Joseon dynasty, which came after Goryeo, recommended people to grow more of these mulberry trees.

The hwang chok kyu usually finishes growing in October. Their roots contain a slimy mucus (called dakpul in Korean) which suspends fibers evenly in the slurry and increases viscosity in the vat to facilitate sheet formation. Otherwise, the papermaking fiber, which is denser than water, would settle to the bottom of the vat and clump on the papermaking screen. This mucilage is not a glue, nor does it hold the fibers together.

=== Process ===
Ancient Koreans usually started making hanji during the winter, because the mucus from Abelmoschus manihot became easily fermented due to the summer heat. Ancient Koreans believed that it was important to choose a good day with a nice sky to start making hanji, and often gave religious rituals to the spirits in order to wish for a favorable condition and a smooth process.

The process of making hanji differs by what ingredients the makers choose, and what methods of sheet formation they take to make the final product. However, the most traditional and basic process follows eight steps:

1. Hanji makers gather clean and strong barks of mulberry trees.
2. The bark is skinned and dried. The result is called Heukpi (흑피, hanja: 黑皮). The Heukpi is kept in flowing water for at least 10 hours. This eases the process of skinning the bark, turning Heukpi into Baekpi (백피, hanja: 白皮).
3. Bean or buckwheat stems are burned, and their ashes are put into water to boil the Baekpi for 4–5 hours.
4. The Baekpi is washed, removing any remaining bark and soil.
5. The skinned and cleaned Baekpi is placed on a flat stone board and pounded (Gohae) for about an hour.
6. The mucus from Abelmoschus manihot (Dakpul) is applied onto the bark. This helps the paper stay together for a long time, and does not contain any harmful chemicals.
7. Sheets of the mixture are formed next, while pouring more Dakpul onto the sheet. It is stirred with a long and wooden stick, and they call this Puldaejil. The final substance is put on a flat bamboo outline, where the surface is made smooth and even. This process is where the skill of the craftsman is truly revealed, as it requires years of experience and practice to achieve good hanji, determining the thickness, texture, and overall quality of hanji. Many methods of this procedure exist, including Hullim, Gadum, Webal, and Jangpan, each producing slightly different types of hanji. Traditional methods of sheet forming is different from the modern day method, which use machinery to make it even.
8. One single sheet of hanji is now made, which is pressed between heavy stones to dry, and placed in a warm room. They do not dry them near fire, because gradually drying them with a warm temperature causes the paper to be more tough and durable.

== Characteristics ==
Hanji is a very reputable paper among Asians, and it is famous for its durability. While other historical print papers have to be preserved in special containers, hanji papers can still be displayed in museums proves. The oldest text made of hanji currently existing in Korea, Mugujeonggwang, is still well preserved after about 800 years.

Hanji is a good ventilator, but it also acts as an insulator. Traditional Koreans covered their wooden doors with hanji because it would cool down in the summer and make them warm during winter.

In March 2006, there was a lamp festival in Paris, France. Many sizes and colors of lamps were lighted in the Boulogne park. Soon after the festival started, there was a sudden rain, and people panicked. They were worried that all the lamps would turn off. However, lamps made out of traditional hanji did not turn off. It did not let the rain through, protecting candle lights within, and it portrayed one of the many advantages of hanji.

The bark from mulberry trees contain lignin and holocellulose, which contribute to the durability of hanji. Ordinary paper has a pH level of 4–5.5, meaning that it is acidic. If paper has a low pH level (more acidic), it is completely decomposed in 100 years. Hanji, however, uses Hibiscus Manihot, which has a pH level of 7 and does not get dismantled easily.

== Types ==
Hanji has approximately 200 types, each with a specific name according to its material, production method, use, color, size and thickness, as well as location. Some of them include:

Name	Korean	Hanja	Description
Ganji	간지	簡紙	Rolled paper used for writing letters.
Gwangyoji	관교지	官敎紙	Used by the government to issue orders.
Jangpanji	장판지	壯版紙	Used to cover floors.
Changpanji	창호지	窓戶紙	Used to cover doors.
Dobaeji	도배지	塗褙紙	Used as wallpaper.
Pyoji	표지	表紙	Used as a book cover.
Unhwaji	운화지	雲花紙	White-colored paper, also called seolhwaji (설화지; 雪花紙) for its snow-like color.
Jukcheongji	죽청지	竹靑紙	Thin white-colored paper.
Hwangji	황지黃紙	黃紙	Yellow-colored paper.
Hwanji	환지	還紙	Made from discarded or old paper, usually from the test papers of those who failed the civil service examinations, or from stolen official records.
Daehoji	대호지	大好紙	Wide and long paper.
Sohoji	소호지	小好紙	Narrow and short paper.

== Uses ==
=== Ancient uses ===
Ever since paper was first introduced to commoners in ancient Korea, its uses have been adapted in various ways. Hanji was used to help people in their daily lives. They covered their door frames with hanji to help control room temperature. Those of high social status, called Yangbans, recorded various documents on hanji. This is one of the main reasons why Korea's ancient records are so well preserved. It was one of the main export products that Korean dynasties used in trading (Seo). Another unique usage of hanji is in armor, which was called jigap. Even though hanji is just paper, it was very durable and tough. It was waterproof, and did not rip easily.

=== Hanji art and craft forms ===
There are two divisions of hanji art: two-dimensional and three-dimensional. Two-dimensional hanji art uses paper of various colors to create an image in a similar format as a painting. However, the paper itself is folded and crumpled to make the image stick up from the paper it is adhered to. People make various shapes with Hanji and frame it to exhibit on their wall. Three-dimensional hanji art is similar to paper mache, in that it can make sculptural objects that may stand unsupported. Traditional hanji craft forms include jiho, jido, and jiseung. Jiho is a method that uses hanji scraps soaked in water and then added to glue, making a clay-like paste that can be molded into lidded bowls. Jido is the craft of pasting many layers of hanji onto a pre-made frame, which can be made into sewing baskets and trunks. Ancient Koreans commonly put their sewing materials in small boxes decorated with colorful Hanji ("Hanji Crafting"). Jiseung is a method of cording and weaving strips of hanji to make a wide array of household goods, including trays, baskets, mats, quivers, shoes, washbasins, and chamberpots. Other than these, Hanji was made into various flowers to decorate Buddhist temples ("Hanji Crafting").

== Gallery ==
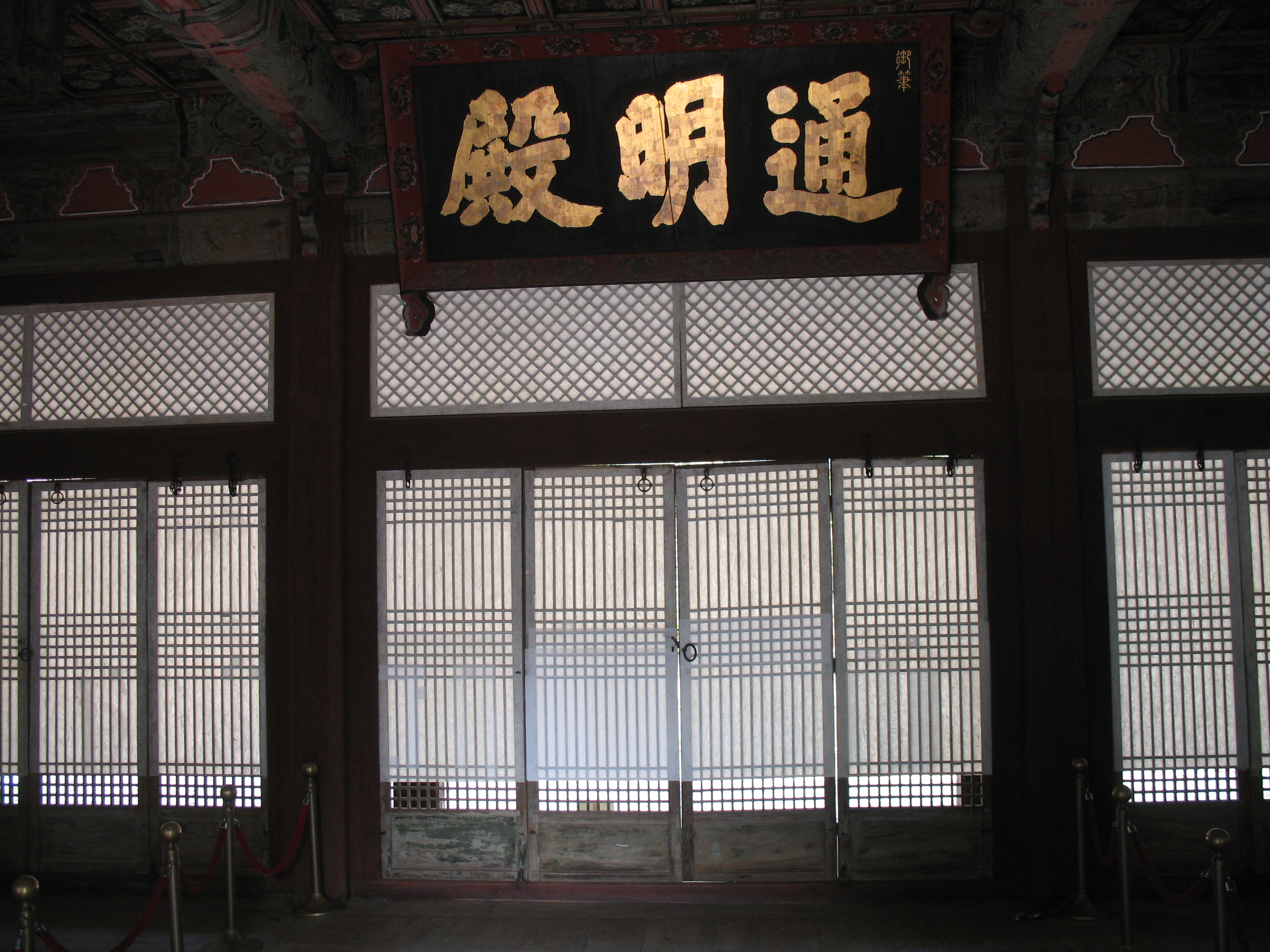
Changhoji pasted on doors at Changgyeonggung

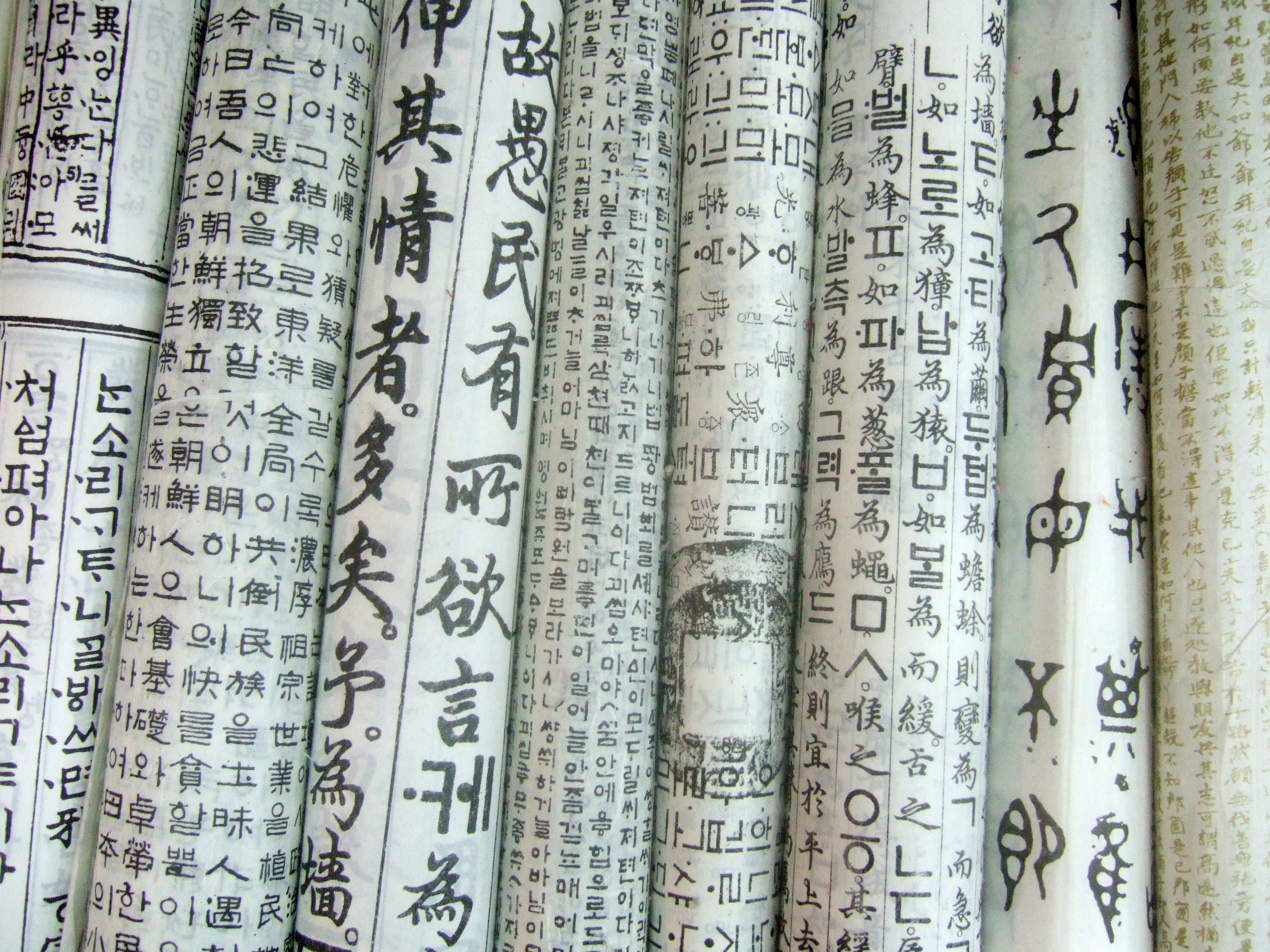
Hangul printed on hanji at a store in Insadong, Seoul

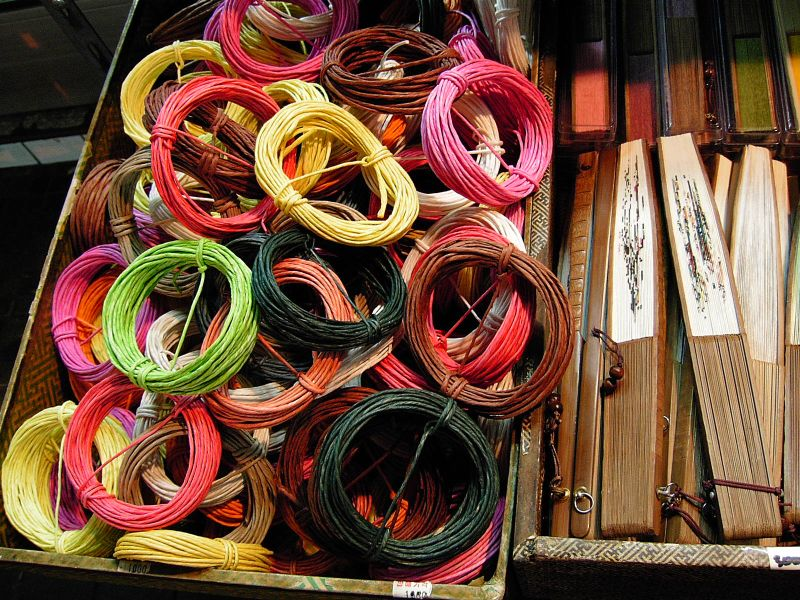
Colorful hanji strings; fans

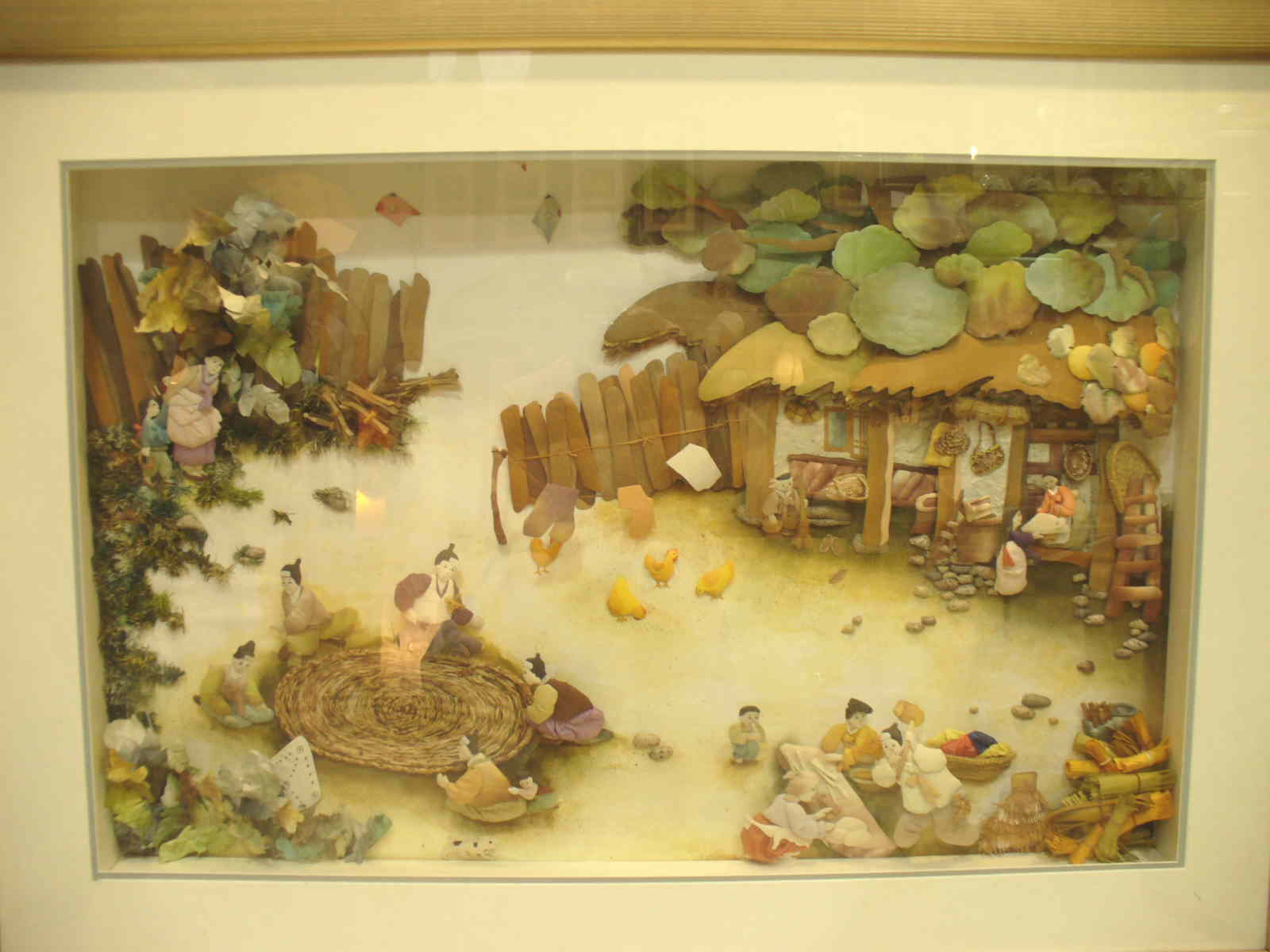
A piece of hanji artwork

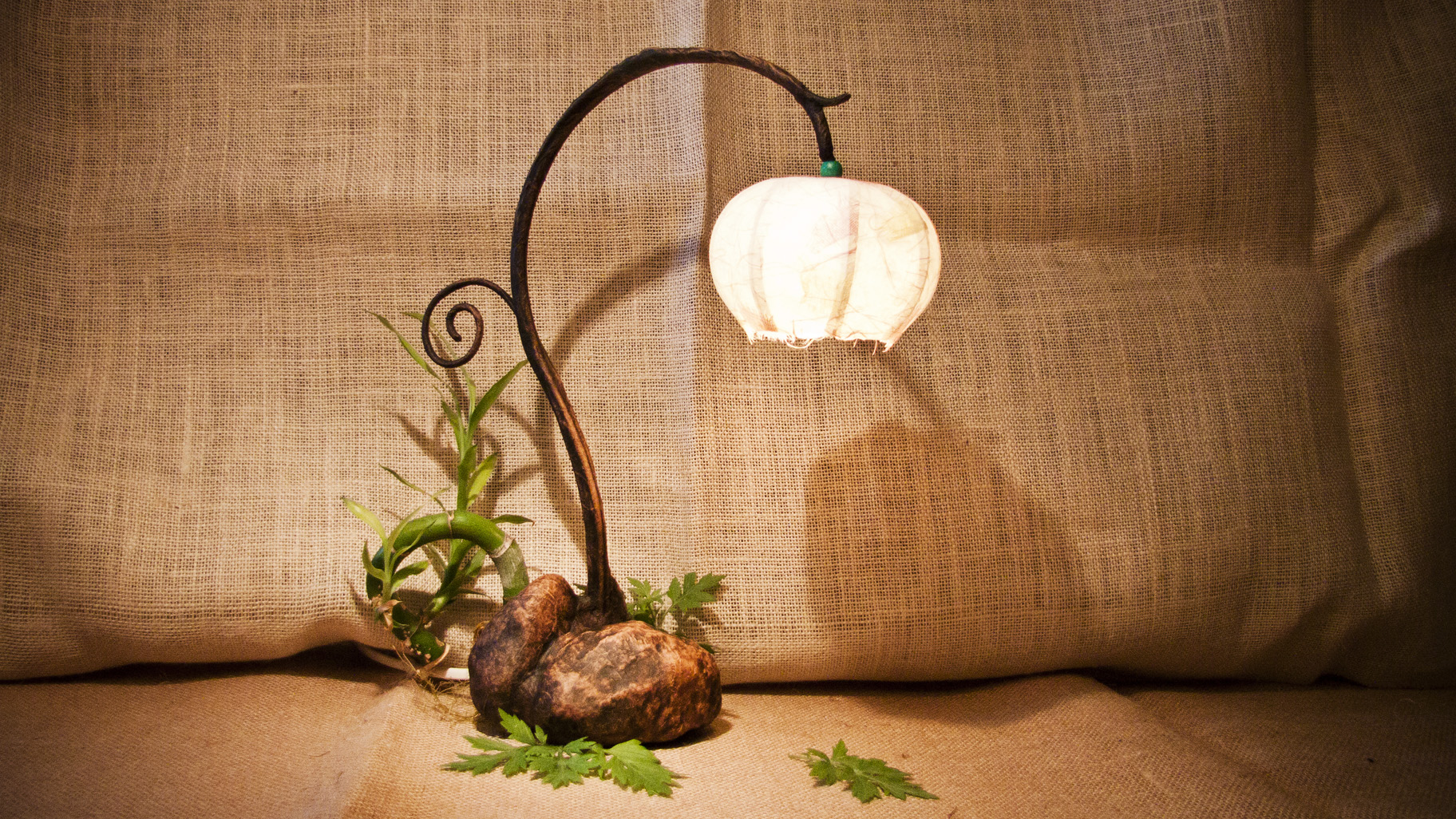
Modern Hanji Lamp

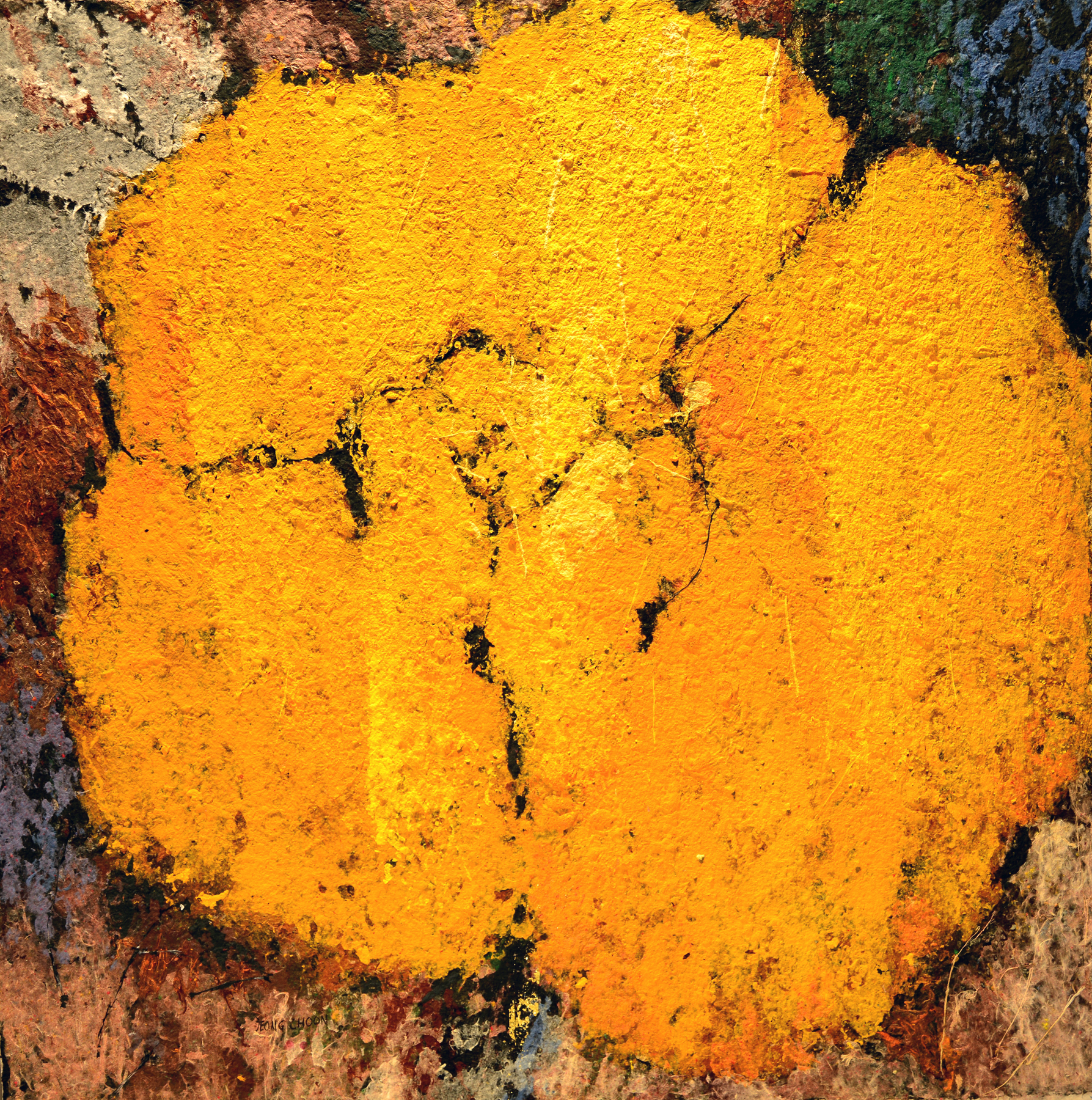
Hanji Artwork by YUN

== See also ==
- Important Intangible Cultural Properties of Korea
- History of typography in East Asia
