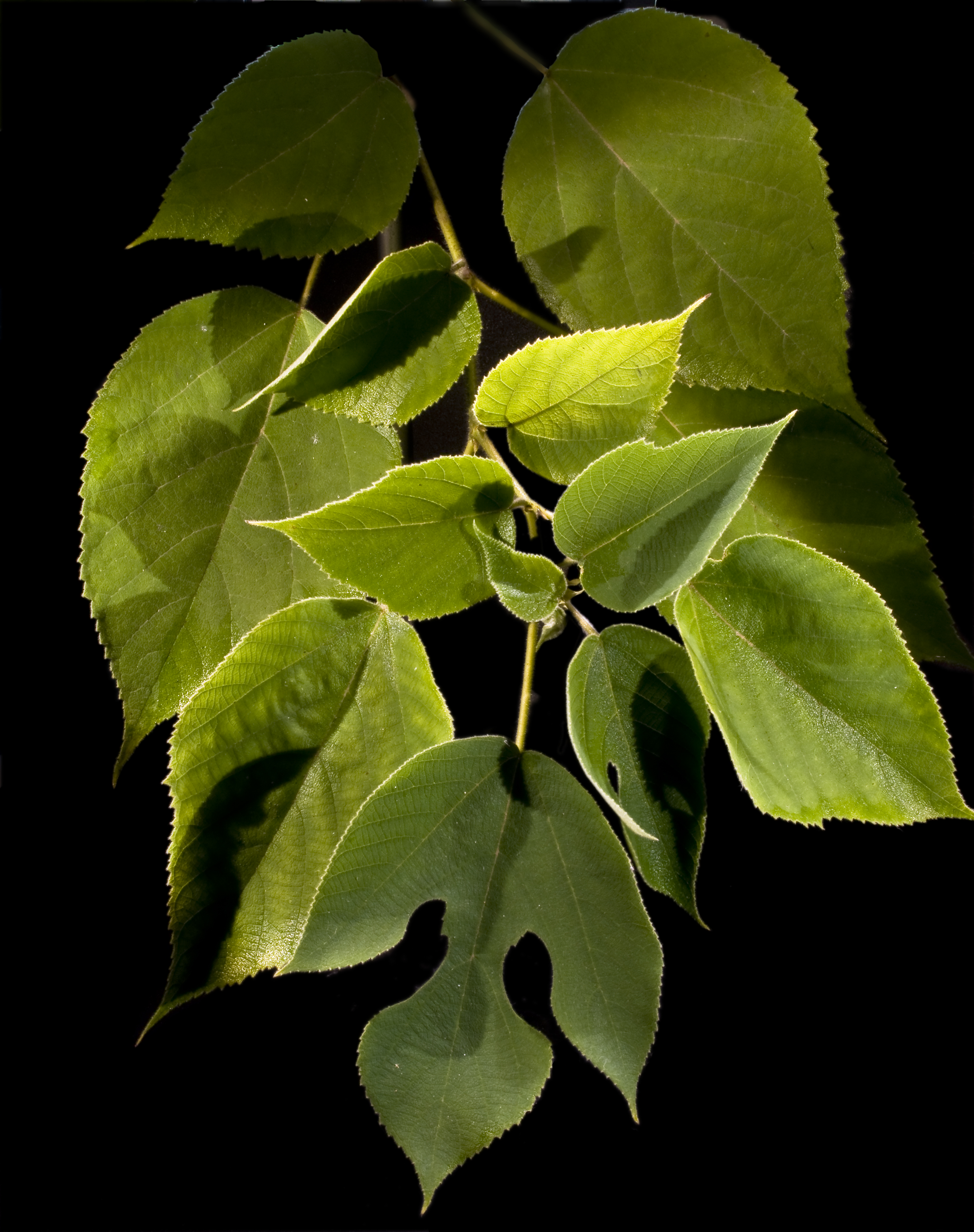

Conservation status
- Least Concern (IUCN 3.1)

Scientific classification
- Kingdom: Plantae
- Clade: Tracheophytes
- Clade: Angiosperms
- Clade: Eudicots
- Clade: Rosids
- Order: Rosales
- Family: Moraceae
- Genus: Broussonetia
- Species: B. papyrifera

Binomial name
- Broussonetia papyrifera (L.) Vent.

Synonyms
- Broussonetia elegans K.Koch; Morus papyrifera L.; Papyrius papyrifera (L.) Kuntze

= Paper mulberry =

Species of plant

The paper mulberry (Broussonetia papyrifera, syn. Morus papyrifera L.) is a species of flowering tree in the family Moraceae. It is native to East and Southeast Asia, including mainland China, Hong Kong, India, Japan, Korea, Myanmar and Taiwan. It is widely cultivated elsewhere as an introduced species in New Zealand, parts of Europe, the United States, and Africa. The tree is valued for its versatile uses. Its inner bark is traditionally processed into barkcloth and is also an important raw material in papermaking.

Other common names include aute and tapa cloth tree. The specific Latin epithet papyrifera describes the use of its barks for papermaking.

== Origin ==
Paper mulberry was used among ancient Austronesians in making barkcloth. Native to subtropical mainland Asia, it provides strong support for the "Out of Taiwan" hypothesis of the Austronesian expansion. Genetic studies have traced paper mulberry in the Remote Pacific back to Taiwan via New Guinea and Sulawesi. Its general absence in the Philippines, where surviving plants largely stem from modern introductions in 1935, suggests earlier prehistoric introductions there went extinct, reinforcing a Taiwanese rather than Island Southeast Asian origin. Additionally, paper mulberry populations in New Guinea also show genetic inflow from another expansion out of Indochina and South China.

It is believed to be the most widely transported fiber crop in prehistory, having been carried across nearly the entire Austronesian world, reaching almost every island group in Polynesia, including Rapa Nui and Aotearoa. It was mainly propagated vegetatively through cuttings and root shoots, rarely from seeds, as plants were usually harvested before flowering and are dioecious, requiring both male and female trees for seed production. Some island populations later extincted when cultivation declined, as in the Cook Islands and Mangareva, though historical specimens gathered by Europeans during the colonial era survive in museum collections. In New Zealand, it was introduced by early Māori settlers (oral histories mention the Ōtūrereao, Tainui and Aotea canoes as being sources) and recorded during James Cook's voyages in the 1770s, but likely became extinct by the 1840s due to reduced cultivation and browsing by introduced livestock. It was later reintroduced to New Zealand from Japanese plants during European colonisation.

== Description ==
This species is a deciduous shrub or tree usually growing 10–20 m (33–66 ft) tall, but known to reach 35 m (115 ft) at times. The leaves are variable in shape, even on one individual. The blades may be lobed or unlobed, but they usually have toothed edges, lightly hairy, pale undersides, and a rough texture. They are up to about 15–20 cm (5.9–7.9 in) long. The species has male and female flowers on separate plants. The staminate inflorescence is a catkin up to 8 cm (3.1 in) long with fuzzy male flowers. The pistillate inflorescence is a spherical head up to about 2 cm (0.79 in) wide with greenish female flowers trailing long styles. The infructescence is a spherical cluster 2–3 cm (0.79–1.18 in) wide containing many red or orange fruits. Each individual protruding fruit in the cluster is a drupe.

== Uses ==
This plant has been cultivated in Asia and some Pacific Islands for many centuries for food, fiber, and medicine.

=== Barkcloth ===
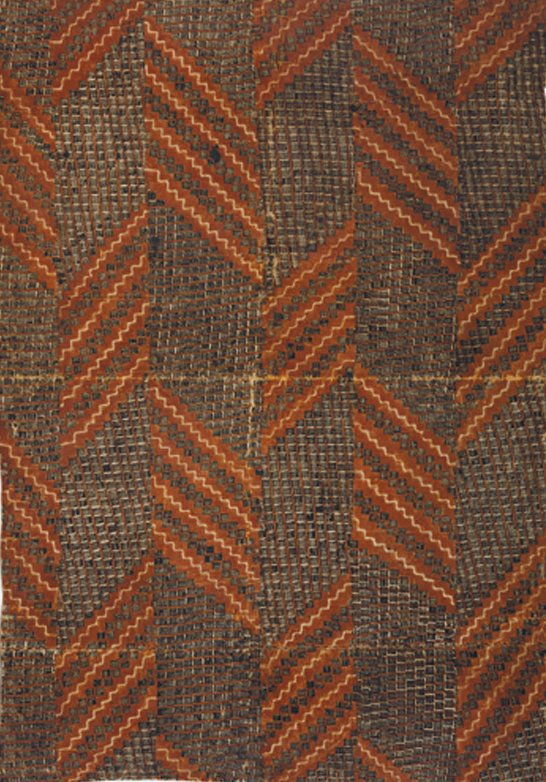
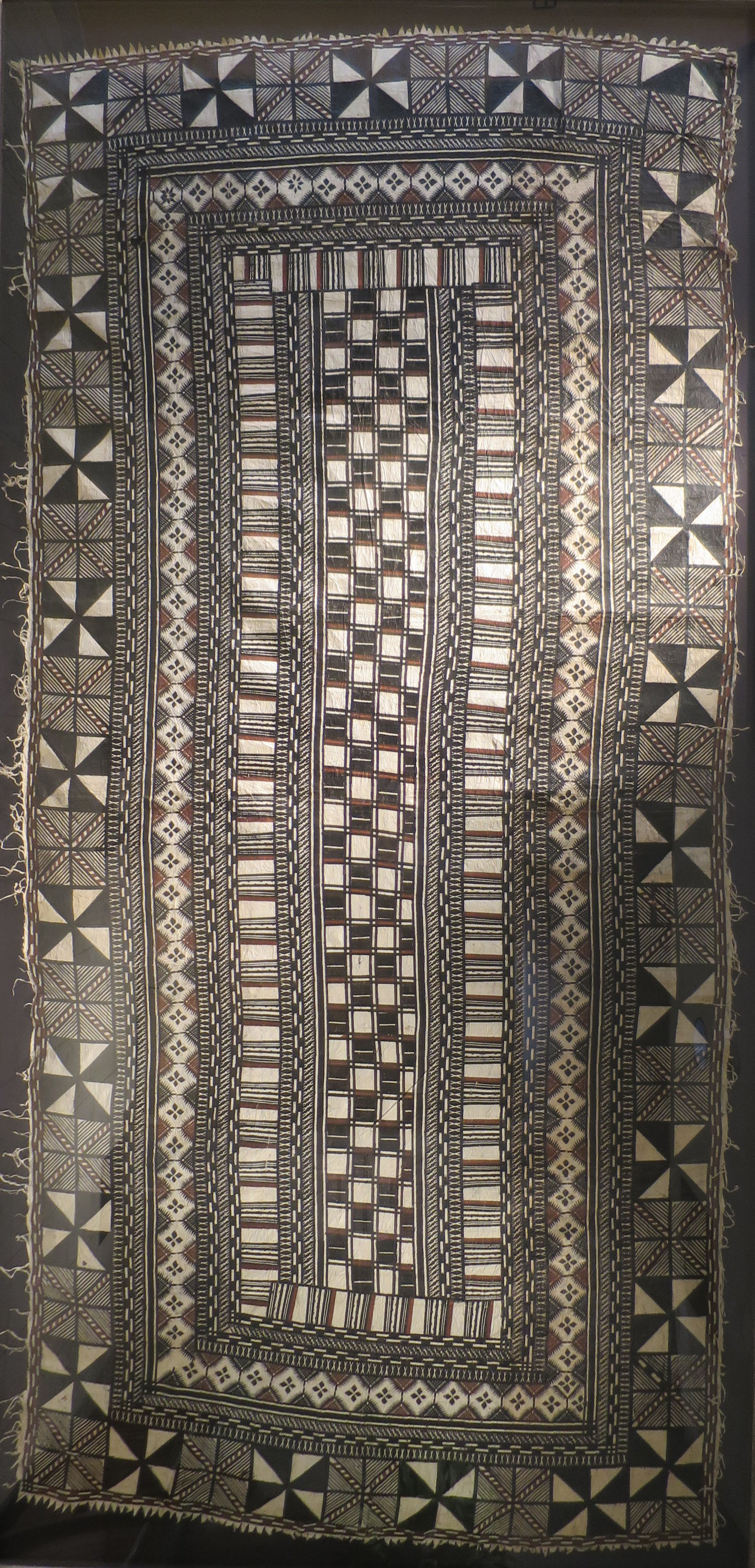
Left: 18th century kapa from Hawaii
Right: 19th century royal tapa from Fiji

Paper mulberry was the principal source of barkcloth, known as tapa in most Polynesian languages. Although barkcloth was also be made from members of Moraceae family, including Ficus (figs) and Artocarpus, and was occasionally made from Pipturus nettles, especially in Hawaii, the highest quality was made from paper mulberry.

Among ancient Austronesians, barkcloth was a primary clothing material produced with stone or wooden beaters, which are among the most common artifacts found in Austronesian archaeological sites. Early examples from the Dingmo site in Guangxi, dated to around (c. 7,900 BP) and numerous finds in southern China, especially around the Pearl River Delta, have been cited as evidence for pre-Taiwan Austronesian homelands prior to the southward expansion of the Han dynasty. In New Zealand, early Māori settlers retained Polynesian barkcloth (aute) techniques despite limited tree growth; by the 1770s it was mainly used for soft white fillets and ear ornaments for high-status men, disappearing in the early 19th century along with the tree, though revival efforts drawing on Hawaiian knowledge are now emerging.

Across Austronesia, names for paper mulberry are not cognates, thus a Proto-Oceanic term cannot be reconstructed; however, Polynesia terms for barkcloth can be reconstructed from Proto-Nuclear-Polynesian *taba ("bark") reflected in Wayan taba and in Tongan, Samoan, Mangareva, and Rarotongan tapa, as well as Hawaiian kapa. Other widely terms stem from the Proto-Polynesian *siapo, seem in Niue, Tongan, and Marquesan hiapo, and in Samoan and East Futunan siapo. The term for barkcloth beater can be traced further back to Proto-Malayo-Polynesian *ikay, with cognates including Uma ike; Sa'a iki; Bauan, Tongan, and East Futunan ike, and Samoan and Hawaiian iʻe.

=== Paper ===
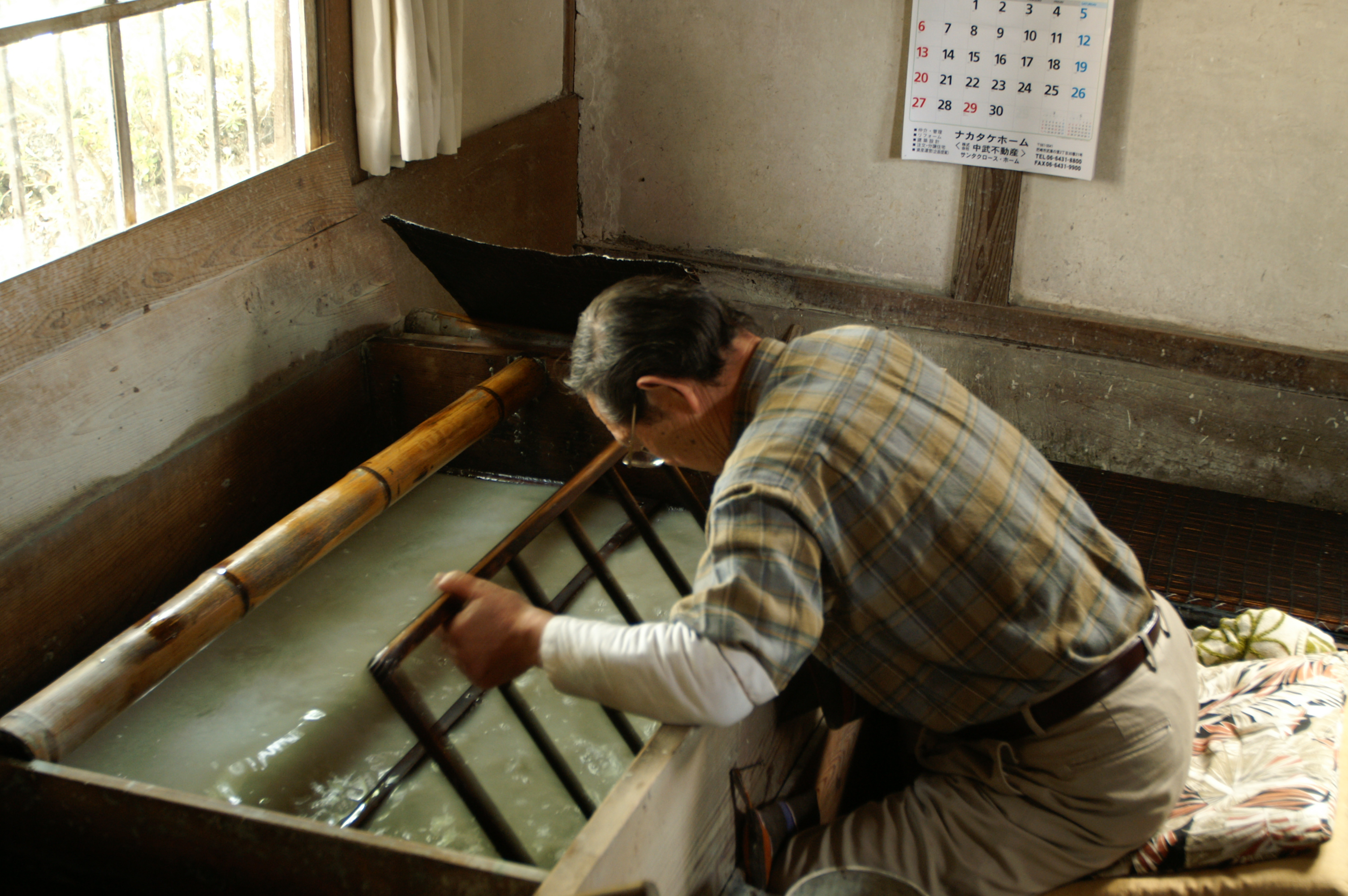
Japanese washi papermaking process

The paper mulberry was a significant fiber crop in the history of paper. Known for its durability and longevity, it continues to be used in various traditional and contemporary paper-making practices today.

It has been used for papermaking in China since sometime between the 2nd and 8th century, and in Korea, the oldest existing block print in the world (c. 751 AD) is printed on hanji paper using its fibers. High quality Korean Hanji and Japanese Washi are typically made from the inner bark of the paper mulberry, which is pounded and mixed with water to produce a paste, and dried into sheets. Mulberry paper is also found in Javanese material culture in the island of Java (daluang paper), where bark beaters for making them have been found dating to the Neolithic period.

=== Other uses ===
The wood of the plant is useful for making furniture and utensils, and the roots can be used as rope.

The fruit and cooked leaves are edible. Historically, the leaves were used as fodder for deer, cattle, and sheep, giving its Chinese nickname 鹿仔樹, lit. 'little deer tree'. Its fruits are rich in profuse saponin and B vitamins. The fruit, leaves, and bark have been used in systems of traditional medicine. The bark and fruit of the species, known locally as jangli toot, are also used as a laxative and antipyretic in rural Pakistan.

The species is used as an ornamental plant. It tolerates disturbance and air pollution, so it has been useful as a landscaping plant on roadsides. It is a pioneer species that easily fills forest clearings, and it has been considered for reforestation efforts. It grows well in many climate types.

== Invasive species ==
The plant is able to readily colonize available habitat, a trait that has contributed to its spread as an invasive species in several regions. It grows rapidly, typically reaching 3-4 metres in height within about two years. When male and female plants occur together, abundant seed production facilitates further expansion. The pollen is wind-dispersed, enabling long-distance fertilization, while seed dispersal are accomplished by animals and insects that consume the fruit. The species can also form dense thickets through its spreading root system. Its tolerance of diverse environmental conditions, including drought and climates ranging from temperate to tropical, has further supported its colonization in new areas. It is regarded as invasive in many countries and has been described as one of the worst weeds in Pakistan, one of the most significant invasive plants on the Pampas in Argentina, and a dominant invasive in the forests of Uganda.

The pollen is allergenic. It is reportedly a main culprit of inhalant allergy in Islamabad, where the species is a very common urban weed. The pollen allergy and asthma caused by this plant sends thousands of patients to hospitals in Islamabad during March. The species should not be taken to other areas without due consideration of the potential of male plants to shed their injurious pollen.

The European Union has included it in the list of invasive alien species of Union concern and hence it cannot be imported, bred, transported, commercialized, or intentionally released into the environment in any of its member states.

== Gallery ==
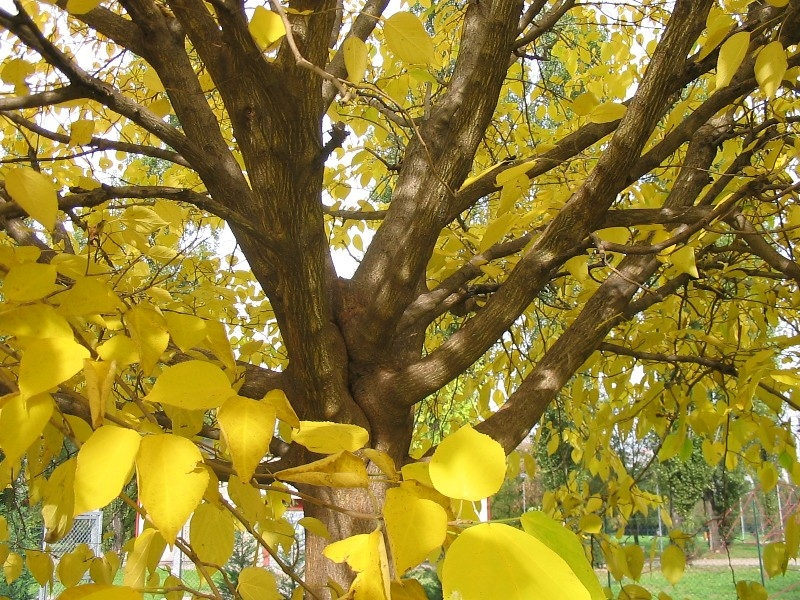
Form

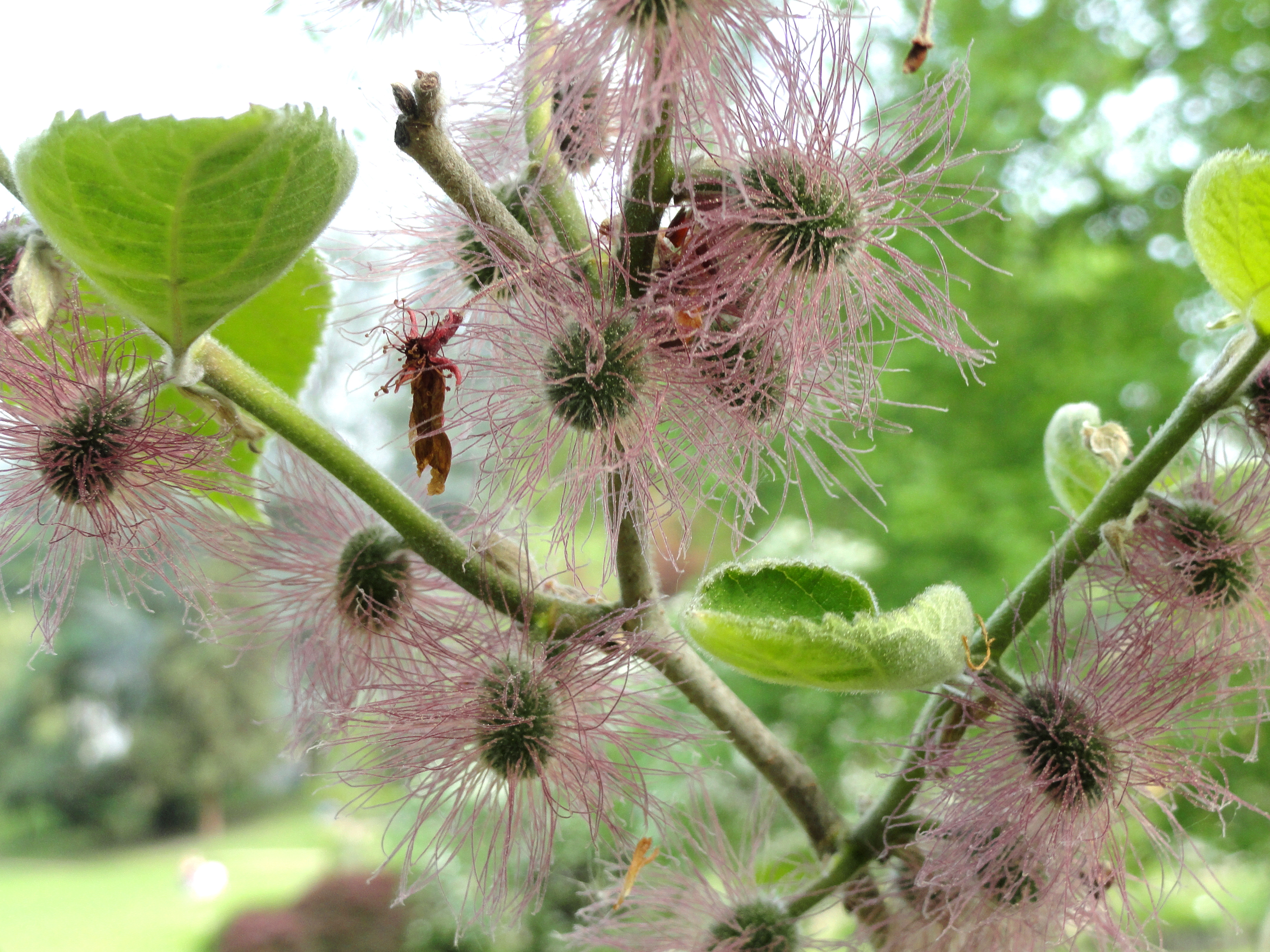
Pistillate flowers

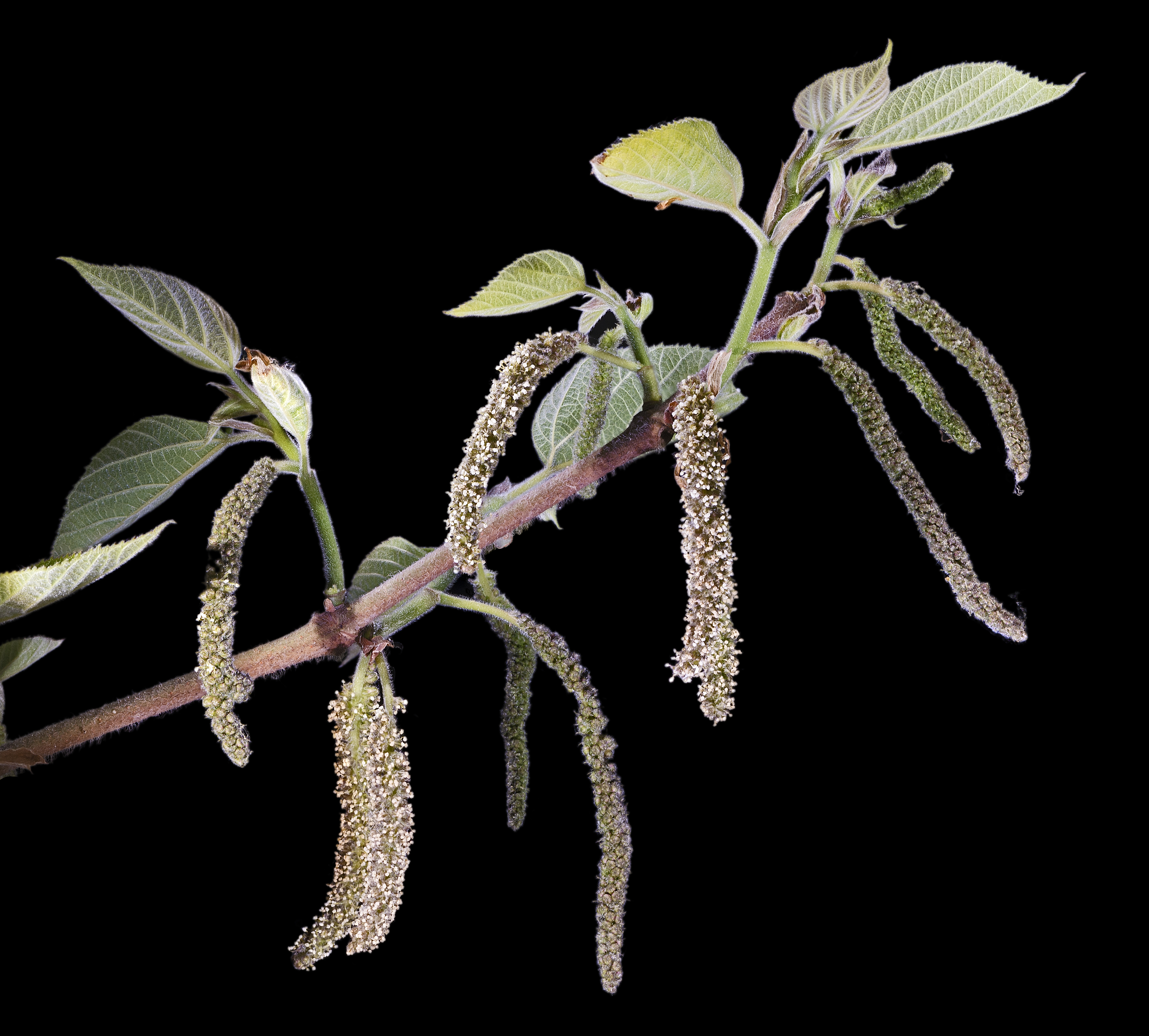
Staminate flowers

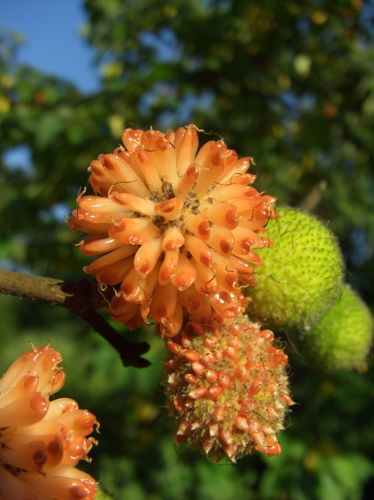
Fruit

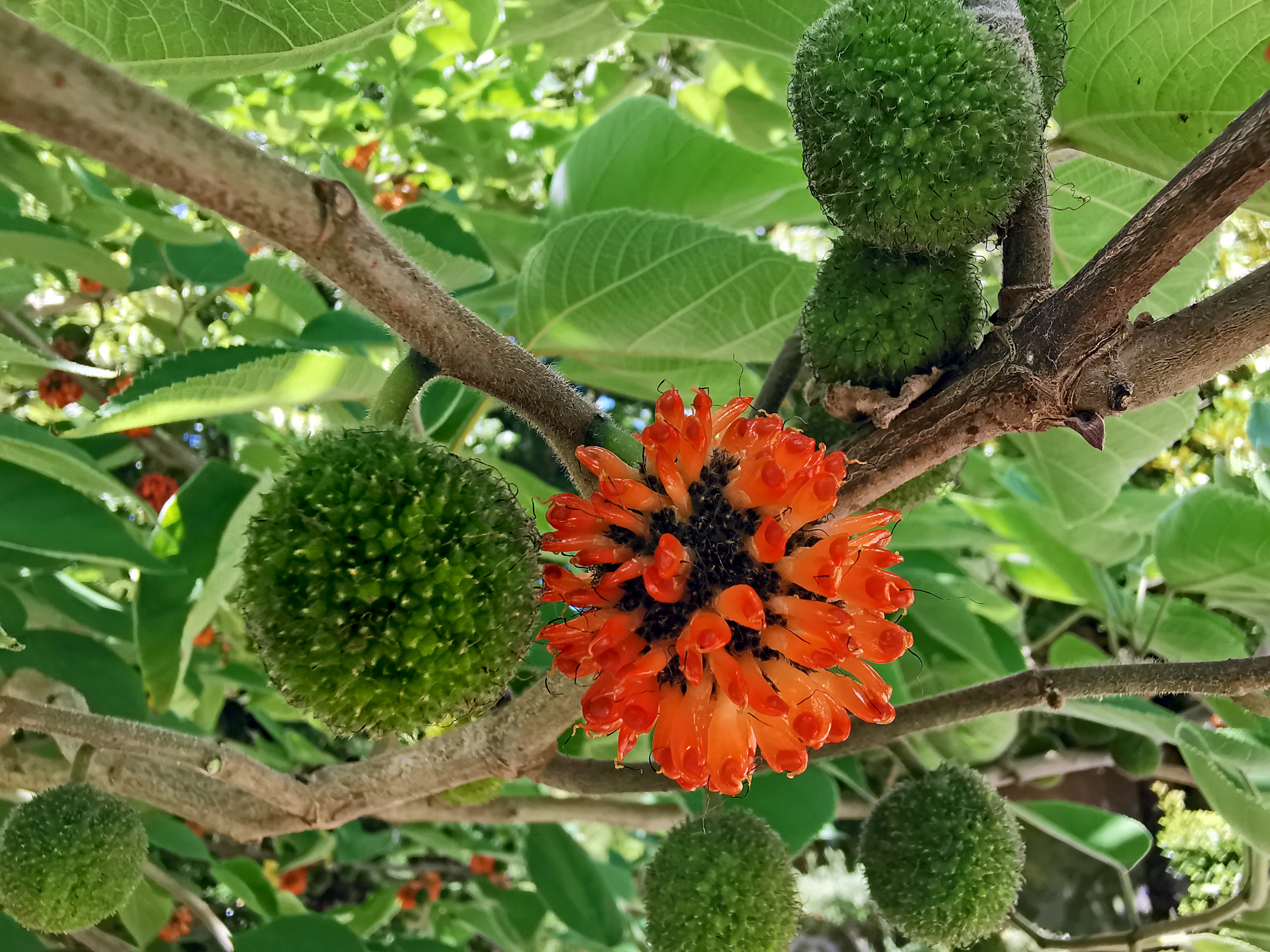
Fruit

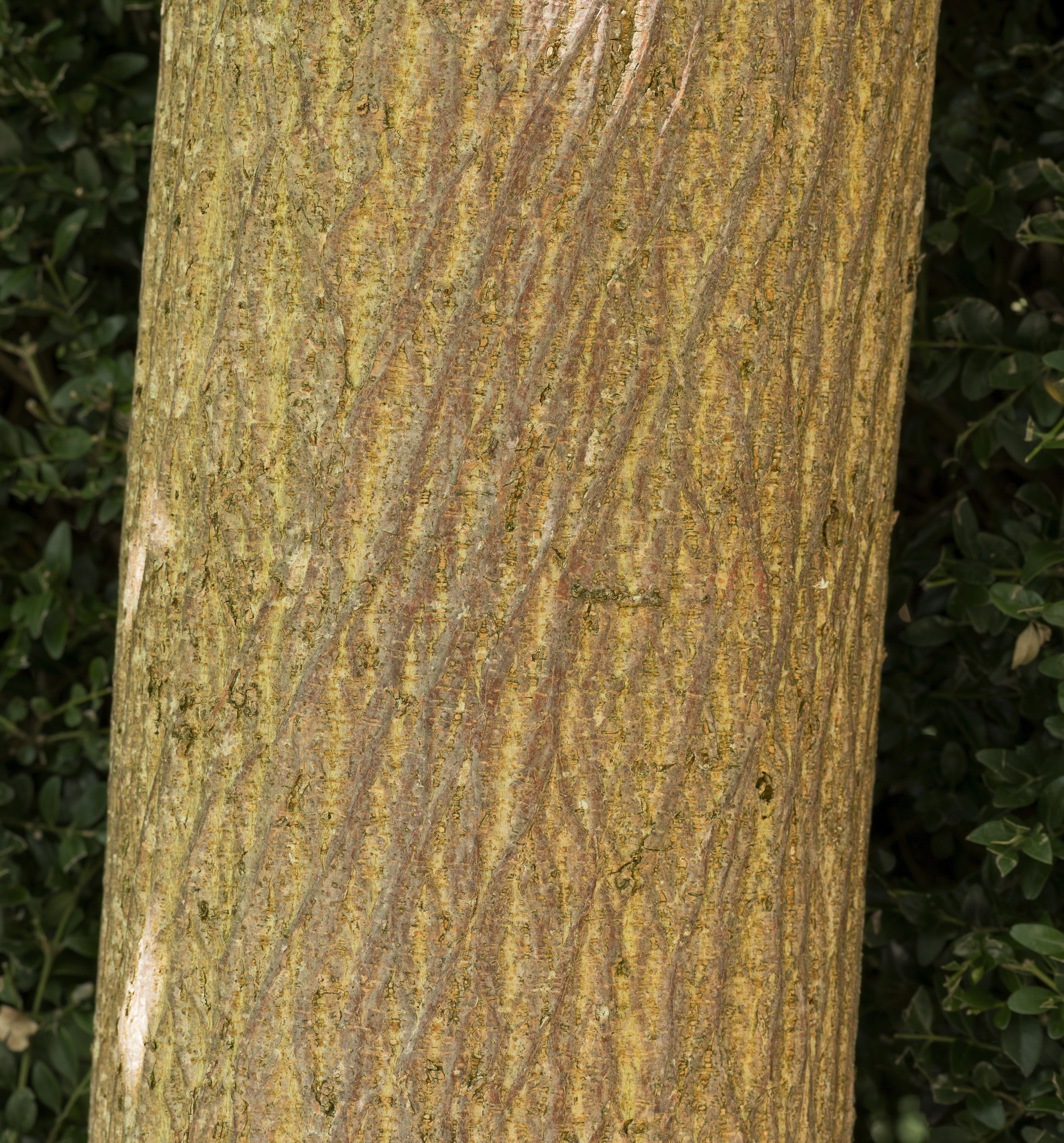
Texture of the trunk

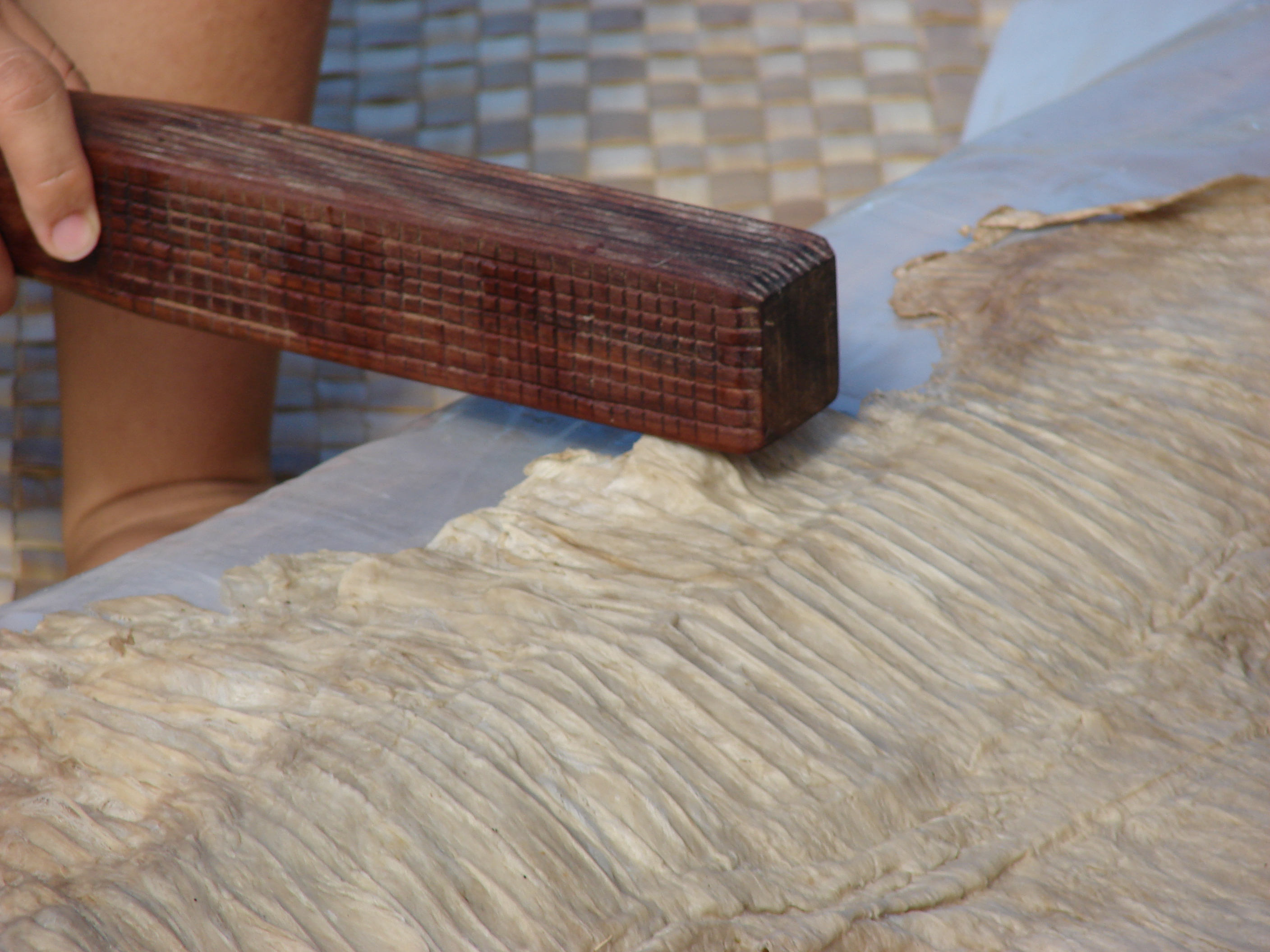
Preparing tapa

== See also ==
- Domesticated plants and animals of Austronesia
