= Lacewood =

Lacewood is a common name for the wood produced from a number of different trees, with mostly a striking appearance of their "lace-wood", which gets its name from the lace like pattern: These include:

- Allanblackia floribunda, Allanblackia parviflora, West African trees
- Cardwellia sublimis, an Australian tree
- Elaeocarpus bojeri, "bois dentelle", due to the unique patterns of its flowers
- Euplassa pinnata, Euplassa cantareirae, trees from northeastern South america
- Firmiana papuana, a tree from New Guinea
- Grevillea robusta, an East Australian tree
- Lagetta lagetto, a Caribbean tree, lacebark tree, lace tree, "bois dentelle", the inner bark is formed of reticulated fibres so as to resemble a coarse kind of lace.
- Macadamia spp., Australian trees
- Monoon oblongifolium (Syn.: Polyalthia oblongifolia) Mempisang, a Philppinean tree, yellow lacewood
- Platanus spp.; Platanus occidentalis American sycamore, Platanus × hispanica London plane
- Panopsis spp.; Panopsis rubescens and Panopsis sessilifolia
- Roupala montana, Roupala cordialis Leopardwood, brazilian lacewood, South American lacewood, Ropala lacewood
- Sterculia shillinglawii, a tree from New Guinea

== Uses ==
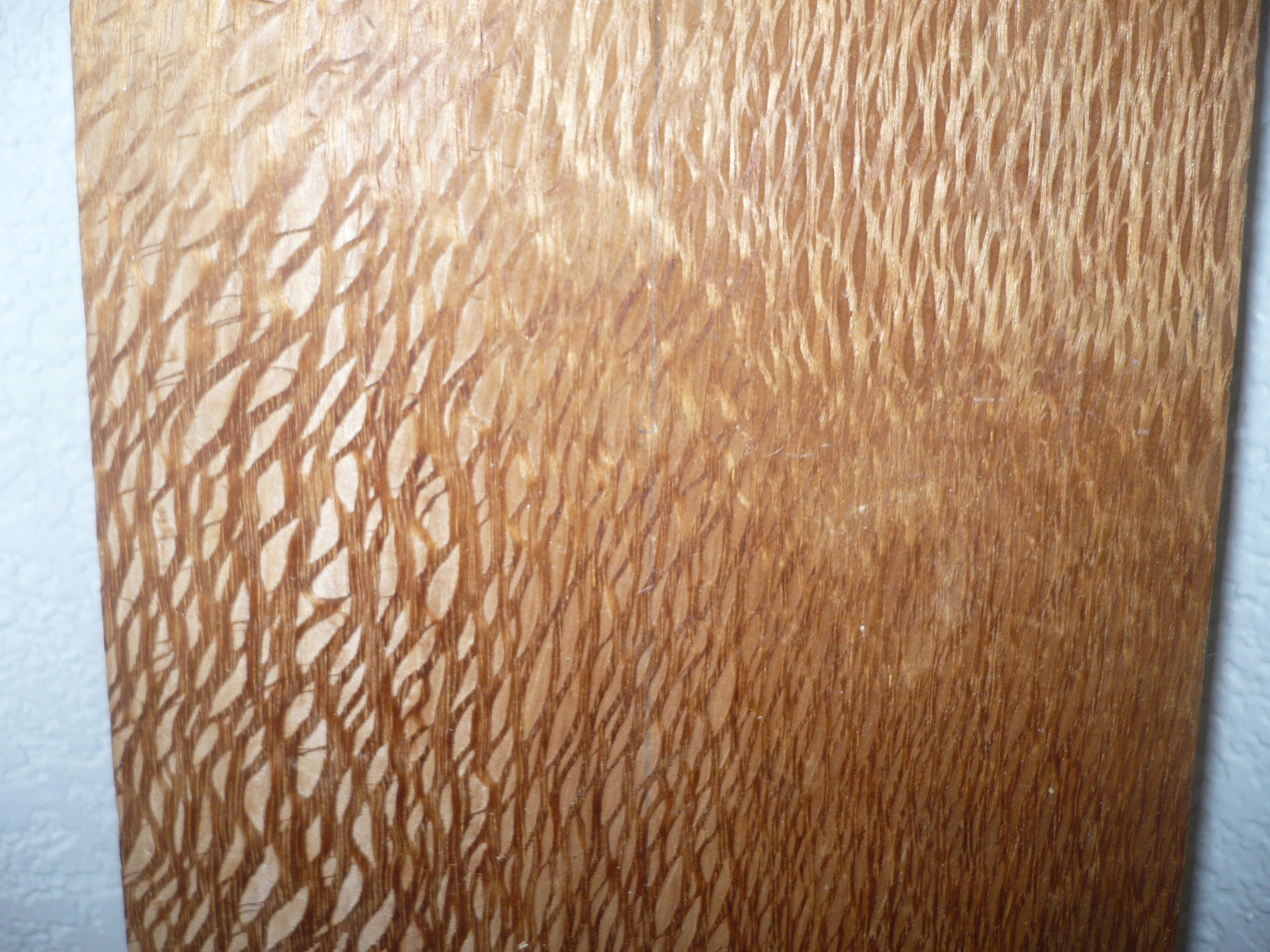
Lacewood

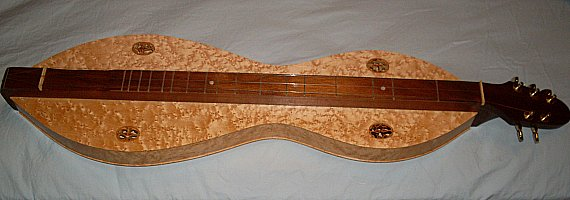
Lacewood dulcimer

== See also ==
- Lacebark
- Lacebark tree
