= Lacebark tree =

Lacebark tree is a common name for several plants with an inner lace-like layer of the inner bark, and may refer to:

- Brachychiton discolor and Brachychiton populneus, native to eastern Australia
- Genus Hoheria, also known as ribbonwood, endemic to New Zealand.
- Lagetta species, especially Lagetta lagetto, native to the Caribbean, also known as lacewood

== See also ==
- Lacebark elm, a common name for Ulmus parvifolia
- Lacebark pine, a common name for Pinus bungeana
