= Sarah Nakisanze =

Sarah Nakisanze is a fashion designer, educator, and researcher from Kampala, Uganda, known for her work with indigenous materials, particularly barkcloth, in eco-product design.

== Biography ==
Sarah Nakisanze is a lecturer at Makerere University's Margaret Trowel School of Fine and Industrial Art and engages with artisanal communities to promote sustainable design practices and craftsmanship. Her research focuses on visual culture, fashion, material culture, and trade relations between the North and South.

== See also ==
- Makerere University
