= I-sala =

Traditional Fijian headdress

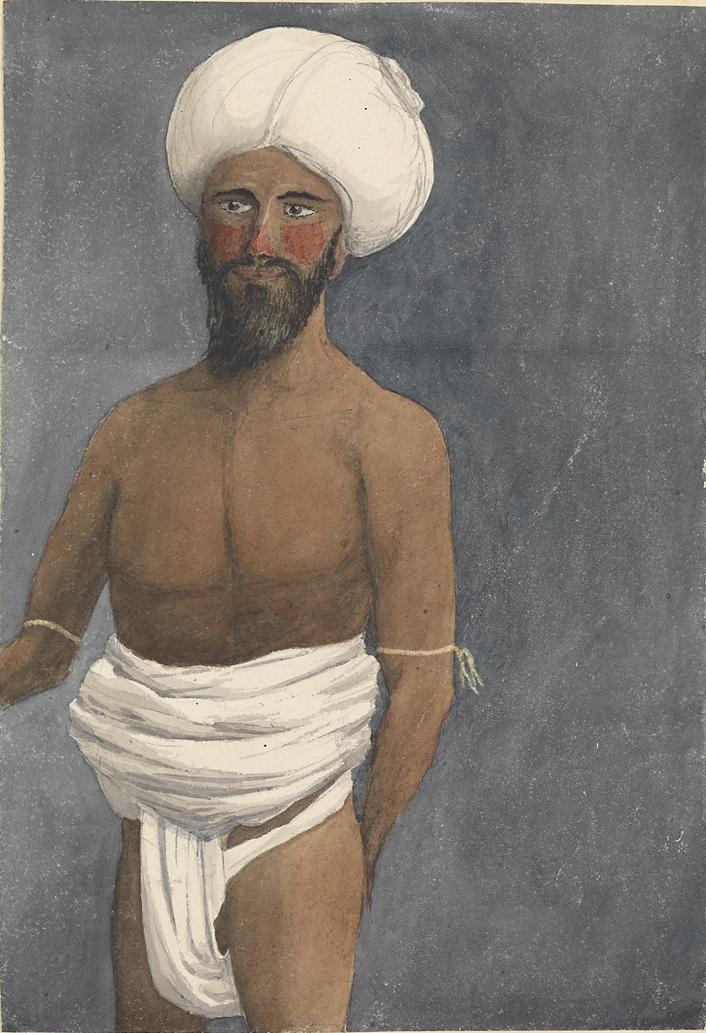
Watercolour portrait of Seru Epenisa Cakobau wearing an i-sala, by Edward Fanshawe, 1849

The i-sala is a traditional Fijian headdress, similar in shape to a headscarf or turban, and part of the traditional attire of the chiefly and priestly classes of the islands of Fiji as a sign of rank. Other variant of the name include sala, i-zinu, i-uso or i-uho, vauvau or paupau and masi turban. I-sala or ai Sala literally means "wrapper or envelope" in the Fijian language.

== Traditional usage ==
The i-sala were made of masi (barkcloth) coverings which were wrapped around the hair of high-ranking men similar to a turban. Most of the bulk and shape of the i-sala came from the bushy hair of the wearer under the cloth. A variant called i-sala kuvui were smoked to a rich brown color, called masi kuvui which were reserved exclusively for the chiefs. Most version of this hairscarf were white. In traditional Fijian society, the custom was restricted solely for priests and chiefs; commoners (kai-si) who were seen wearing the i-sala could be punished with death.

A 19th-century missionary Thomas Williams described the custom in Fiji and the Fijians: The Islands and Their Inhabitants (1858):

The turban, consisting of a gauze-like scarf of very fine white mast, from four to six feet long, is worn by all Fijians who can lay claim to respectability, except such as are forbidden its use. The apparent size is entirely regulated by the quantity of hair underneath, which is generally considerable. This head-dress may be fastened by a neat bow in front, or tied in a tassel-knot on the top of the head, or arranged so as to hang in lappets on one side. By some it is worn as a band or cord at the root of the hair, the greater part being allowed to fall down the back. In most cases it is ornamental and graceful.

After the Westernization of Fiji, the custom of wearing i-sala and the practice of males growing out their hair was discouraged by the Christian missionaries.

== Contemporary usage ==
Although the i-sala became largely obsolete by the end of the 19th century, the custom of wearing the i-sala still remains in certain regions in modern-day Fiji. The chiefs of Natewa, one of the most traditional masi-producing regions on the island of Vanua Levu, and also the chiefs on the island of Lakeba are known to still wear the i-sala for certain tribal rituals.

== See also ==
- History of Fiji
- Ratu
- Tapa cloth
