= Lacebark =

Lacebark is a common name for several plants, lacebark trees and may refer to:

- Lacebark or lace-bark, a textile made from Lagetta lagetto species
- Lacebark, a common name for species in the genus Brachychiton
- Lacebark, a common name for species in the genus Hoheria
- Lacebark elm, a common name for Ulmus parvifolia
- Lacebark pine, a common name for Pinus bungeana
