= Ribbonwood =

Ribbonwood is a common name for several plants. They are like the lacebarks in having an inner layer of bark made up many lace-like layers, which can be torn into ribbon-like strips, and may refer to:

- Adenostoma sparsifolium, more commonly known as red shanks or ribbon bush, a large shrub native to upper chaparral in California and Baja California
- Idiospermum australiense, an Australian tree
- Genus Hoheria, also known as lacebark
- Plagianthus regius, a New Zealand tree, lowland ribbonwood, Chatham Island ribbonwood
- Plagianthus divaricatus, a New Zealand tree, salt marsh ribbonwood, swamp ribbonwood, shore ribbonwood, coastal ribbonwood, swamp fragrant ribbonwood or fragrant ribbonwood
