= Tapa cloth =

Barkcloth made in the island cultures of the Pacific Ocean

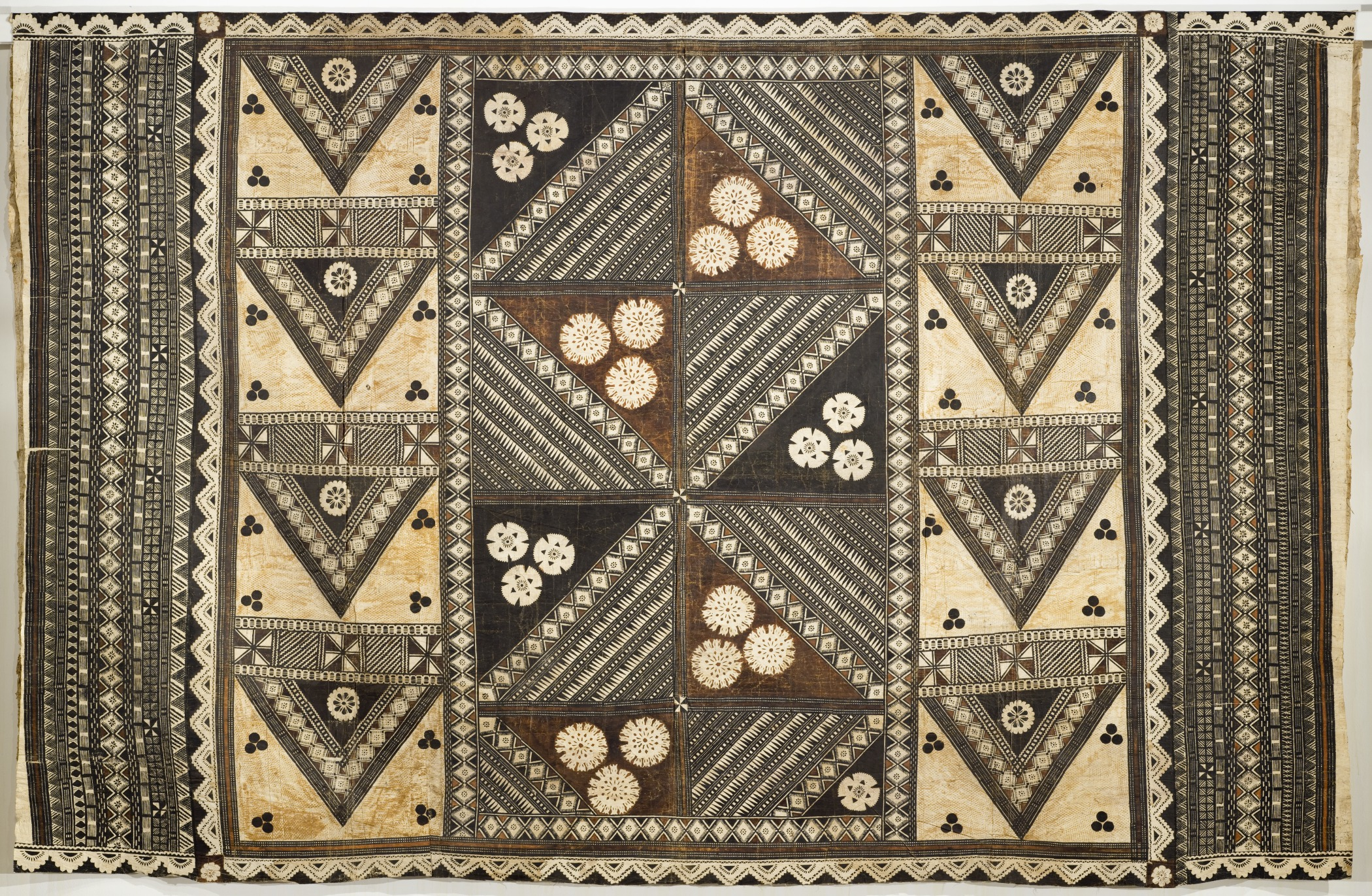
Fijian wedding tapa, 19th century, from the collection of Los Angeles County Museum of Art

Tapa cloth (or simply tapa) is a barkcloth made in the islands of the Pacific Ocean, primarily in Tonga, Samoa and Fiji, but as far afield as Niue, Cook Islands, Futuna, Solomon Islands, Java, Sulawesi, New Zealand, Vanuatu, Papua New Guinea and Hawaii (where it is called kapa). In French Polynesia it has nearly disappeared, except for some villages in the Marquesas. In Melville's Typee, the ship Dolly enters the harbor of Nukuheva where it is met by "swimming nymphs ... their adornments were completed by passing a few loose folds of white tappa, in a modest cincture, around the waist."

== General ==
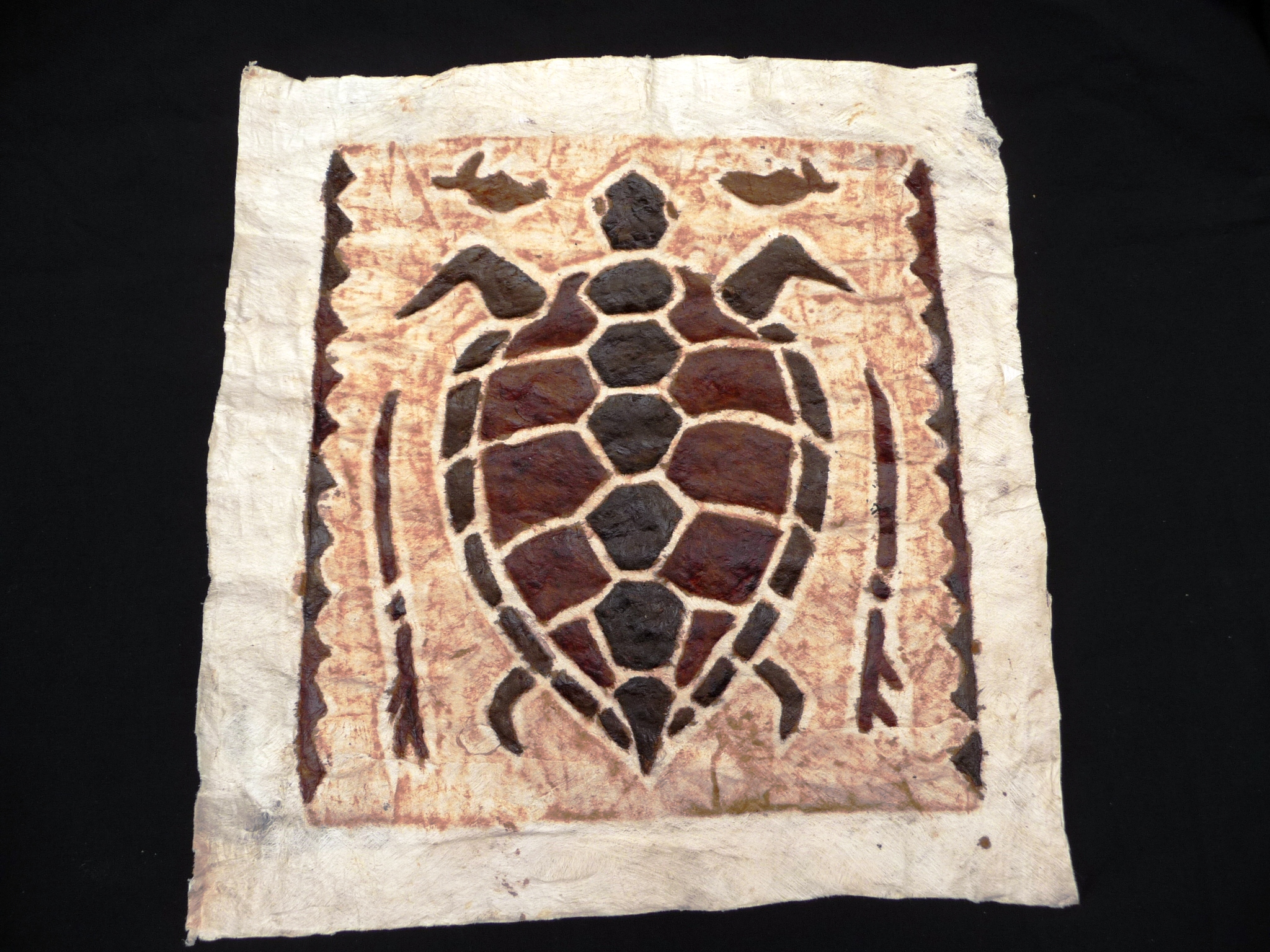
This tapa cloth was made in Papua New Guinea. Tapa can be made from the inner bark of paper mulberry or breadfruit trees.

The word tapa is from Tahiti and the Cook Islands, where Captain Cook was the first European to collect it and introduce it to the rest of the world. The cloth is also known by a number of local names, although the term tapa is international and understood throughout the islands that use the cloth. In Tonga, the same cloth is known as ngatu, and it is of great social importance to the islanders, often being given as gifts. In Samoa, it is called siapo, and in Niue it is hiapo. In Hawaii, it is known as kapa. In Rotuma, a Polynesian island part of Fiji, it is called ʻuha and in other Fijian islands it is called masi. In the Pitcairn islands it was called ʻahu, and in New Zealand was known as aute. It is also known as tapia.

During voyages of migration the paper mulberry tree (Broussonetia papyrifera) known as hiapo or siapo was introduced from Southeast Asia. Tapa cloth was present in Western Polynesia (Fiji, Tonga and Samoa) by about 1000 AD and then spread throughout the Pacific as people voyaged to islands further afield. Tapa also has the meaning of border or strip. It seems likely that before the glueing process became common to make large sheets (see below) only narrow strips were produced.

Tapa can be decorated by rubbing, stamping, stencilling, smoking (Fijian: masi kuvui, "smoked barkcloth") or dyeing. The patterns of Tongan, Samoan and Fijian tapa usually form a grid of squares, each of which contains geometric patterns with repeated motifs such as fish and plants, for example four stylised leaves forming a diagonal cross. Traditional dyes are usually black and rust-brown, although other colours are known.

In former times the cloth was primarily used for clothing, but now modern textiles have replaced it. The major problem with tapa clothing is that the tissue loses its strength when wet and falls apart. However, it was better than grass skirts, which usually are either heavier and harder or easily blown apart. Tapa is also labour-intensive to manufacture. Tapa cloth was made by both men and women in ancient times, for example in Hawaii.

Nowadays tapa is often worn on formal occasions such as weddings. Another use is as a blanket at night or for room dividers. It is highly prized for its decorative value and is often found hung on walls as decoration. It has been used in ceremonial masks in Papua New Guinea and the Cook Islands (Mangaian masks). It was used to wrap sacred objects, e.g., "God staffs" in the Cook Islands.

In some places, artists are reviving tapa-making and creating modern interpretations of the art using new techniques or designs.

== Fabrication ==
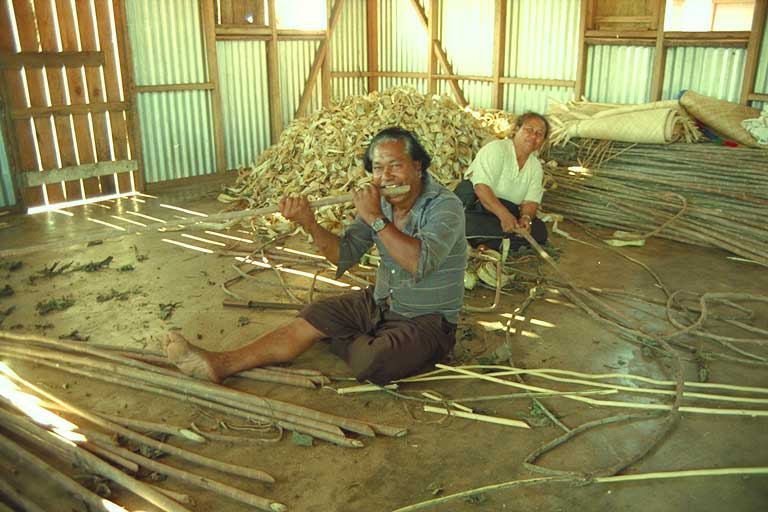
Stripping the bark from the trees in Nomuka

=== Tonga ===
Tapa cloth is or ngatu still a part of daily life in Tonga. In Tonga a family is considered poor, regardless how much money they have, if they do not have any tapa in stock at home to donate at life events like marriages, funerals and so forth. If the tapa was donated to them by a chief or even the royal family, it is more valuable.

In Tonga hiapo is the name given to the paper mulberry tree. It is not usually grown in whole plantations, but portions of a yam or other vegetable garden are often set aside for it. Trees are cut down and the bark is stripped off. The strips are about 10 cm wide and up to 180 cm long. The bark consists of two layers; the outer bark is scraped or split off from the inner bark. The outer bark is discarded, and the inner bark, named tutu or loututu, is dried in the sun before being soaked.

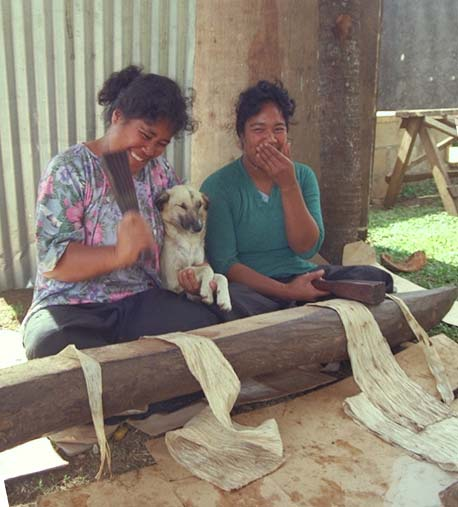
A break from beating the tapa in Nukuʻalofa

After this, the bark is beaten on a wooden anvil (tutua) using wooden mallets called ike. In the beating the bark is made thinner and spread out to a width of about 25 cm (9.8 in). The mallets are smooth on one side and have coarse and fine grooves on the other sides. First the coarse sides are used and, towards the end of the work, the smooth side is used. The continuous "thonk" beats of the tapa mallet is a normal sound in Tongan villages. If several women work together they can make a concert out of it. In that case there might be one who beats the end of the tutua to set the rhythm.

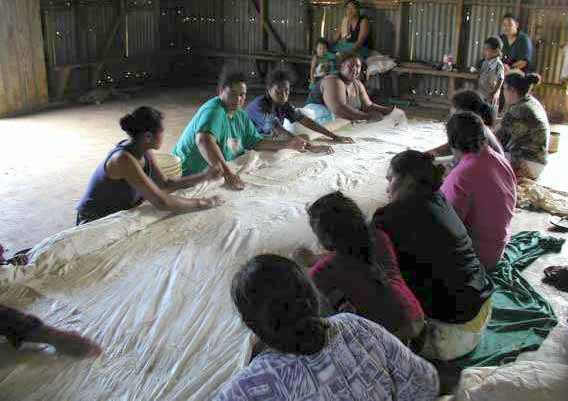
Ready to rub the koka onto the fetaʻaki in ʻEua

When the strips are thin enough, several are taken and beaten together into a large sheet. A starch paste from the kumala or manioke may be rubbed on places which are unwilling to stick. The resulting sheet of tapa is called fetaʻaki, consisting of two layers of strips in at right angles. Often the women of a whole village work together on a huge sheet of tapa. A donation is made to the church or their chief at an important occasion. Such sheets are about 3 m (9.8 ft) wide and 15 or 30 m (49 or 98 ft), or sometimes even 60 m (200 ft) long. The 15 m pieces are called launima (meaning five-sheet, because the sheet is five squares), and the 30 m pieces are called lautefuhi.

The German ethnographer Friedrich Ratzel described the fabrication of tapa in an 1896 publication:

A circular cut is made with a shell in the bark above the root of the tree; the tree is broken off, and in a few days, when the stem is half-dry, the bark and bast are separated from it. The bast is then cleaned and macerated in water, after which it is beaten with the ribbed club on a wooden block. This beating enlivens a village in Tonga as threshing does in Europe. In half an hour the piece will have changed in shape from a strip almost to a square. The edges are snipped with shells, and a large number of the pieces are drawn separately over a semi-cylindrical wooden stamp, on which the pattern, worked in coco-fibre, is stretched and smeared with a fluid at once adhesive and colouring. On each a second and third layer is placed; and the piece, three layers thick, is coloured more strongly in the parts which are thrown into relief by the inequalities of the bed. Others are annexed to it both at the side and the end, until pieces a yard wide, and 20 to 25 yards long, are produced.

— Friedrich Ratzel

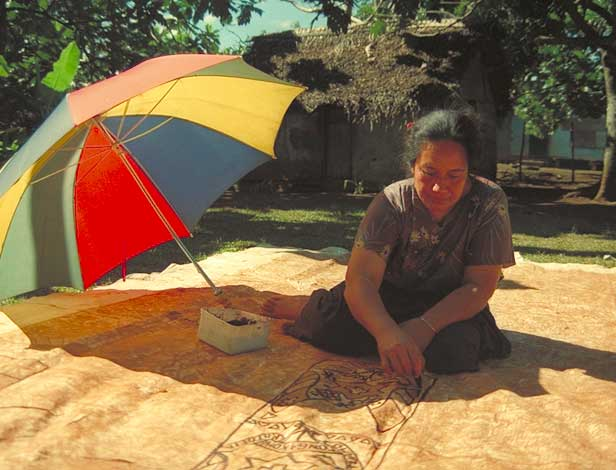
A Tongan woman accentuating the kupesi design

The fetaʻaki is almost always painted. It then becomes ngatu, the Tongan word for the final product. Painting is done over the whole length, but only the central 2.5 metres (8 ft 2 in) in the width. On both sides there is an unpainted border of about 20 cm (7.9 in) wide, which in Tonga is called the tapa. To paint the sheet, it is draped over a huge wooden drum or kupesi (upeti in Samoa) covered with stencils. These stencils are made from coconut frond midribs (or any other sticks of a few millimeter thick) and made in the pattern which will be used. There are a handful of standard kupesi designs, like the 'pine road' (the road from the palace to the royal cemetery), or the 'shield of Tonga', or the 'lion' (the king), or the 'dove' (the king as ruler), and more abstract figures like the 'Manulua' (two birds).

Once the tapa sheet is put over the drum, the women rub with force a dabber with some brown paint (made from the koka tree (Bischofia javanica)) over the sheet. This work is called tataʻi. Where they rub over a rib of the kupesi more paint will stick to that position while very little will stick elsewhere. In this way the basic pattern is put on the sheet. Once a part is done, they lift up the sheet and proceed to the next strip and so forth. When the whole sheet has been processed, it is spread out on the ground and painted with a brush made from Pandanus seeds. The women will accentuate the faintly visible marks with some more generous paint, this time made from the tongo, the mangrove (Rhizophora mangle). Both koka and tongo paint are always brown, but the latter is much darker. Black is not used in Tonga, although it is characteristic of Fijian tapa.

It is customary that during the painting process lines are drawn on the ngatu along the width every 45 cm (18 in) or more. The kupesi are made to the size that will fit in the divisions thus made. Such a division is known as langanga and they are numbered (on the blank tapa) from one to as many as needed for the whole length. When a smaller piece of ngatu is needed, the sheet is cut along a langanga division. A 4 to 6 langanga piece is called folaʻosi. An 8-piece is fātuua, while a 10 langanga piece of ngatu is known as toka hongofulu. Less common are the double fātuua, named fātufā or double of that again, the fātuvalu. Nowadays for the tourist trade other sizes and designs can be made as well.

=== Samoa ===
Tapa cloth is known as siapo in the Samoan archipelago (Samoa and American Samoa). Siapo has traditionally been used for clothing, burial shrouds, bed covers, curtains and ceremonial garments. It is also often given as a gift at weddings, funerals and formal events. There are two forms of siapo: siapo 'elei or siapo tasina (the rubbing method) and siapo mamanu (the freehand method).

Siapo is made from the bark of the paper mulberry tree (u'a). The tree is harvested when it is about one year old and the trunk is one to two inches in diameter. The bark is peeled from the tree and the outer bark stripped off with a sharp knife. The inner bark layer is moistened and then scraped with clam shells of varying coarseness (pipi, pae, and 'asi). This process removes any remaining bark or green growth and softens and spreads the fibres of the bark. Next, the bark is beaten with a wooden mallet (i'e) over a wooden anvil (tutua).The i'e is four-sided, with two smooth sides and two grooved sides. The tutua is a log about eight inches wide and three to six feet long, used by one to three women at a time. As the u'a is beaten it becomes softer and wider. When the beating is finished, the u'a is stretched out flat to dry.

Siapo 'elei (the rubbing method) uses a board known as an upeti which has a design carved into it. The upeti used to be hand-sewn from leaves, fibers and bamboo, but these were fragile. After the introduction of wood carving tools, leaf upeti fell out of use. Today upeti designs are carved onto wooden planks or boards. A swab is wiped over the board and the u'a (dried piece of cloth) is placed on top of the board and rubbed with a pad of dye to bring out the underlying design carved into the board. Red clay is used to darken the design. The u'a is wiped over with a starchy adhesive made from arrowroot. Small holes are patched and then a second layer of u'a is placed on top of the first layer and the rubbing process repeated. The piece is then lifted from the board and left to dry. Once dry, the design on the u'a is highlighted by painting over sections with dye. Larger pieces can be created by joining smaller sections together. A large piece of siapo 'elei tapa used in formal ceremonies is known as siapo vala.

Siapo mamanu (the freehand method) is newer than siapo 'elei and made primarily for tourists to hang up as artwork. It does not use an upeti. Formerly, pieces of u'a were stretched over boards using a temporary glue which allowed the artist to remove the piece from the board when completed. The u'a was then hand-painted with whatever design the artist wished. Modern siapo mamanu pieces are created by stretching and glueing the u'a over a piece of wood of any shape, which forms part of the art: the u'a is not removed from the wood after painting.

Thirteen symbolic design elements were traditionally used in siapo. Two have since fallen out of use and another is rarely used. The design elements represent various plants and flowers, birds, the trochus shell, starfish and nets. The different elements are combined into many patterns.

Natural dyes made from plants are used in siapo. Colours include brown, from the Bishofia javanica or blood tree; black, from burned candlenuts; red, from pods of the lipstick tree; and yellow, from turmeric. Red and yellow are used in siapo Mamanu but not siapo 'elei. Purple, made with the sap of a banana tree, is no longer used.

Production of siapo in American Samoa decreased after World War 2 as villages were depopulated due to huge migration to Hawaii and the United States. At the same time, increasing adoption of western culture diminished the use of siapo in everyday life. By the 1960s, siapo dealer and artist Mary Pritchard worried that siapo making would die out completely. From the 1970s Pritchard began teaching classes and the art of siapo began to revive, but in the 21st century only a few people in American Samoa and some families in Samoa, especially on the island of Savai'i, produce work. In particular, Palauli village in Savai‘i has a reputation for the production of high-quality siapo. Modern uses of siapo include jewellery, handbags, placemats and wall hangings, many aimed at the tourist market.

Stages of making Samoan siapo

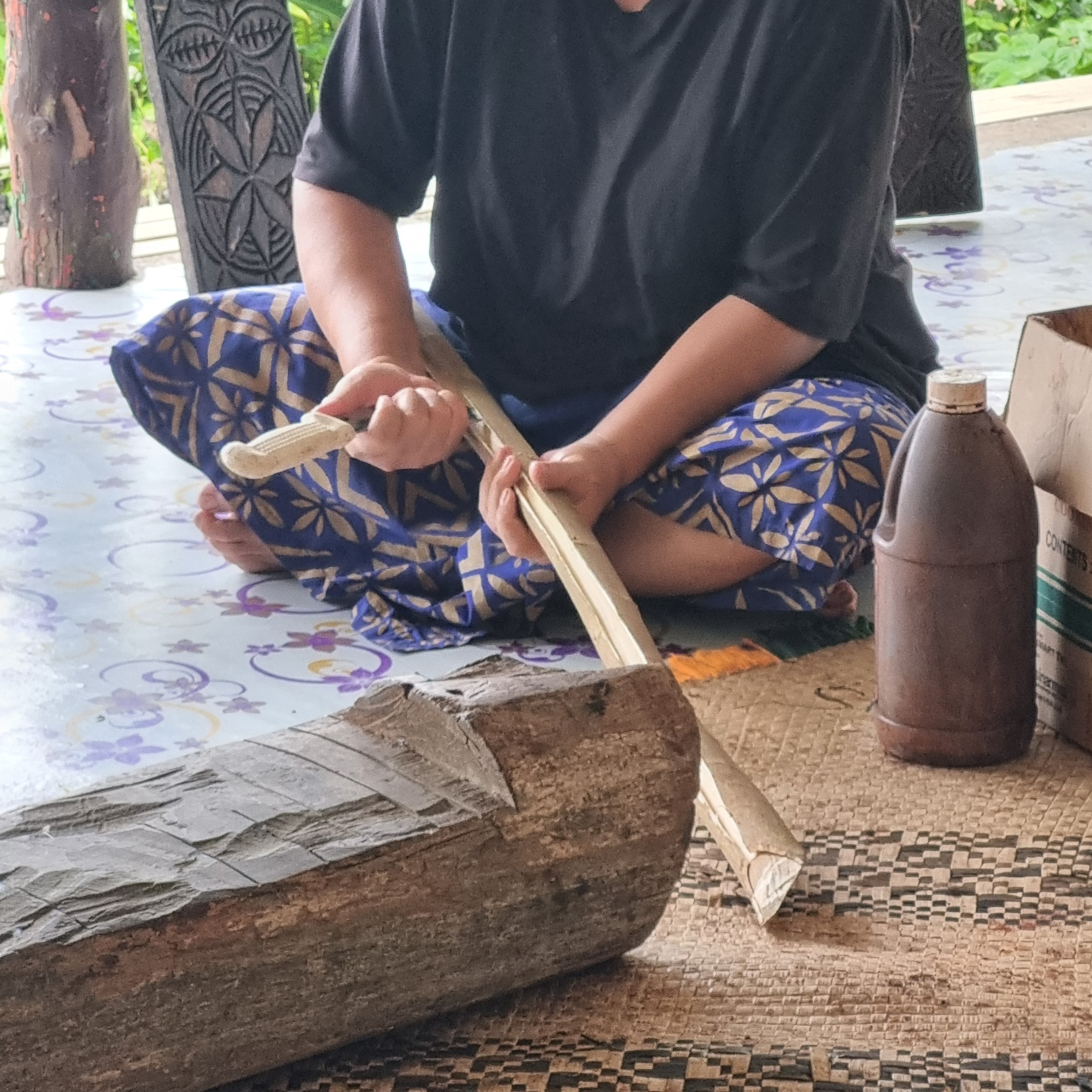
Peeling the bark from a u'a trunk

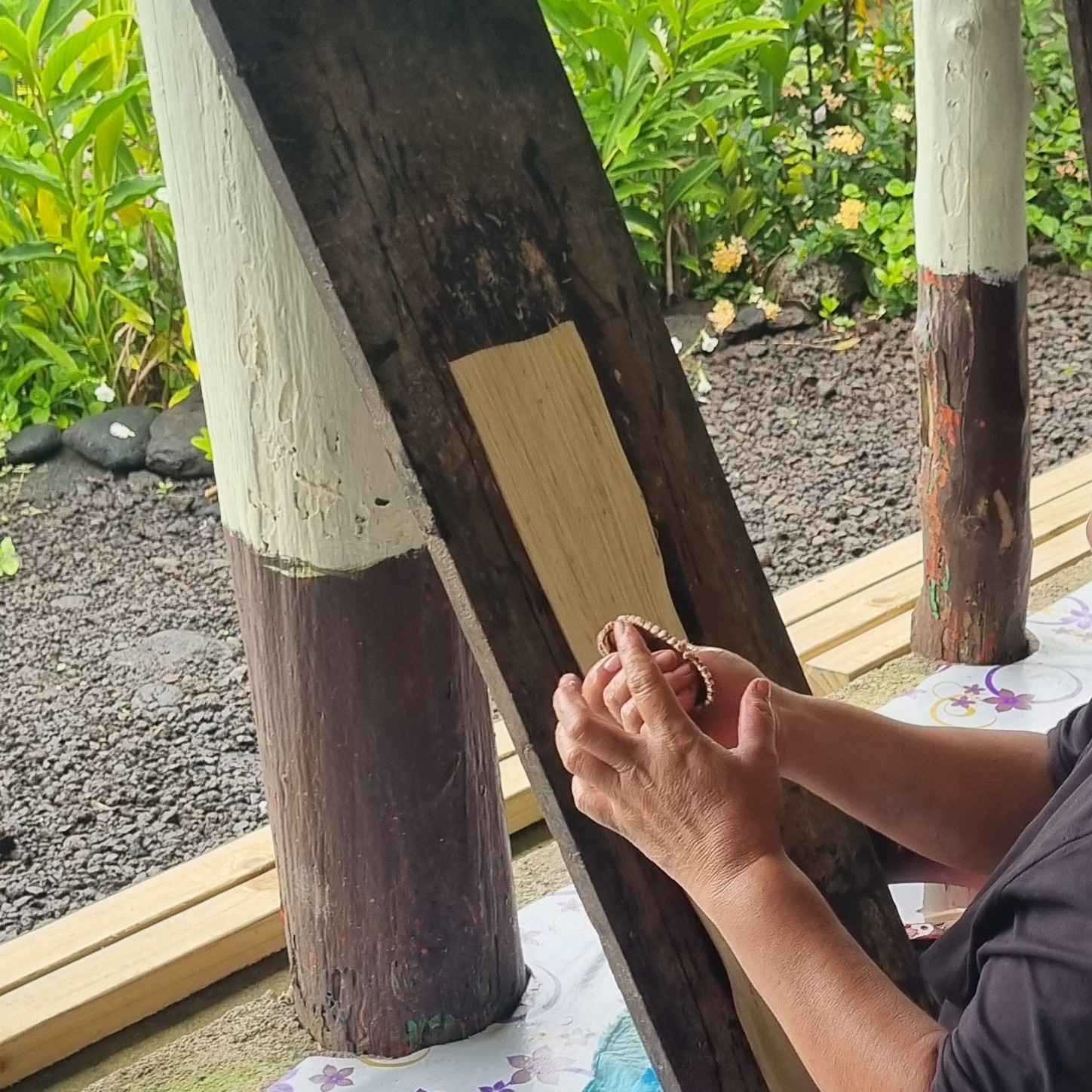
Scraping the bark with a shell

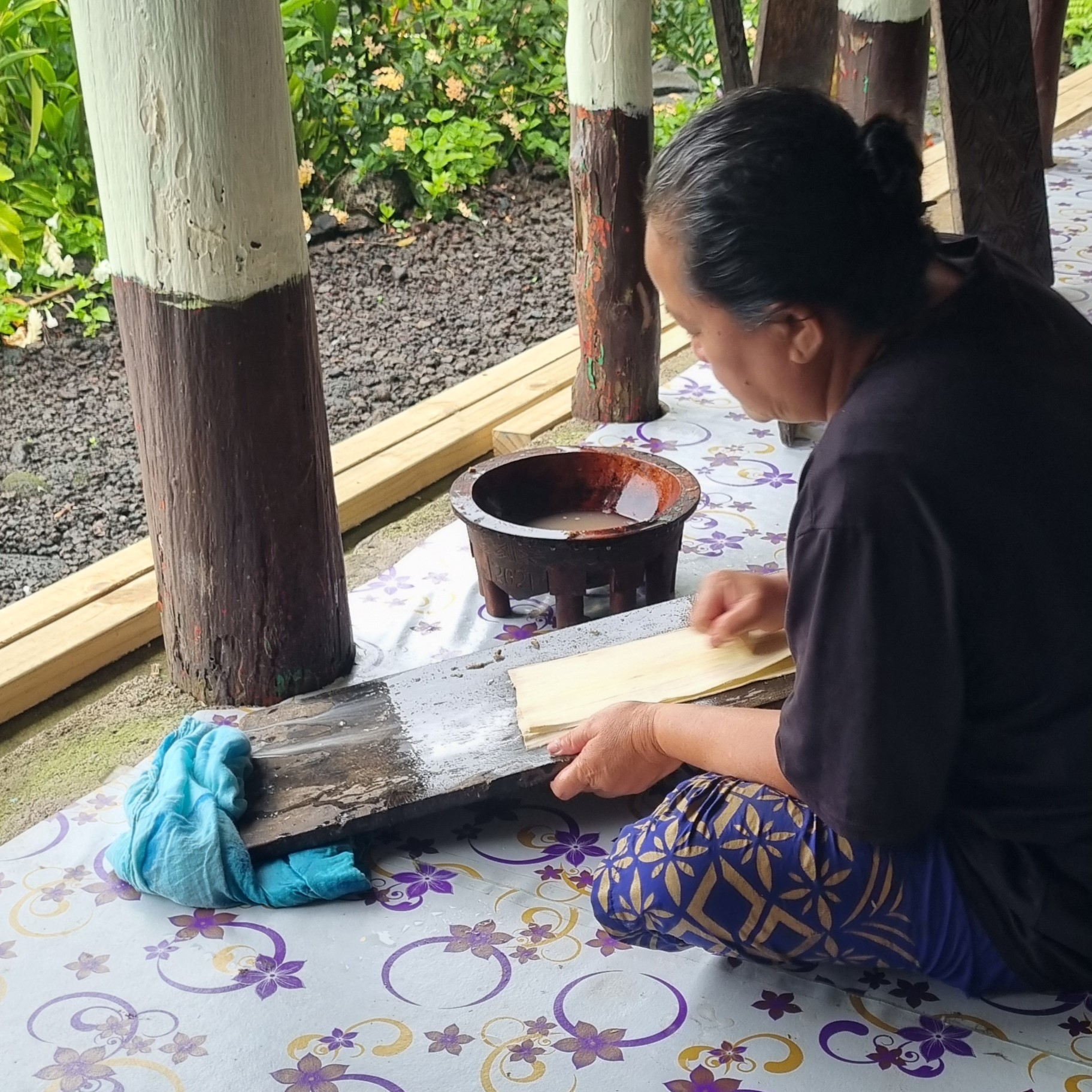
Using water and a shell to scrape and soften the bark

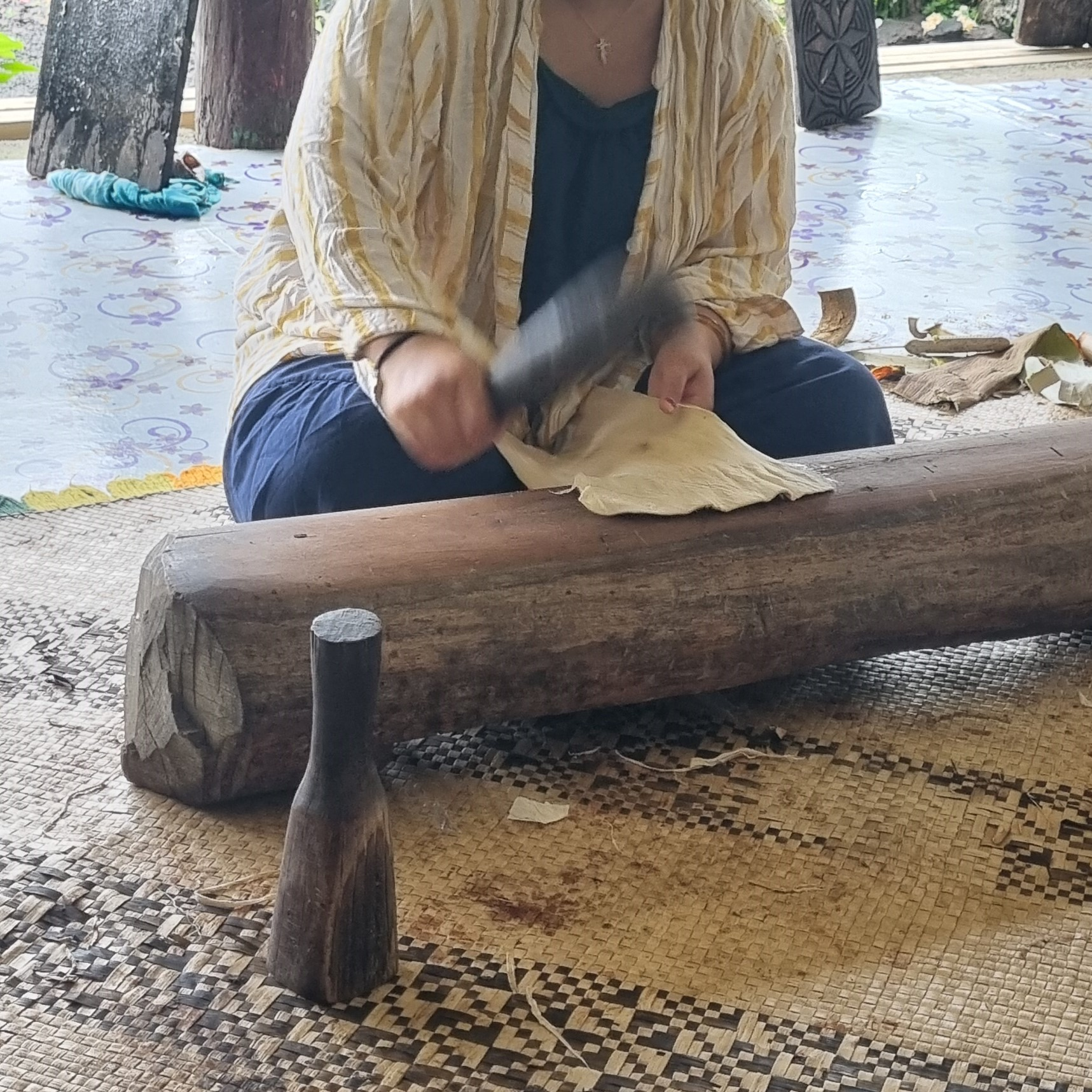
Beating the bark over an anvil

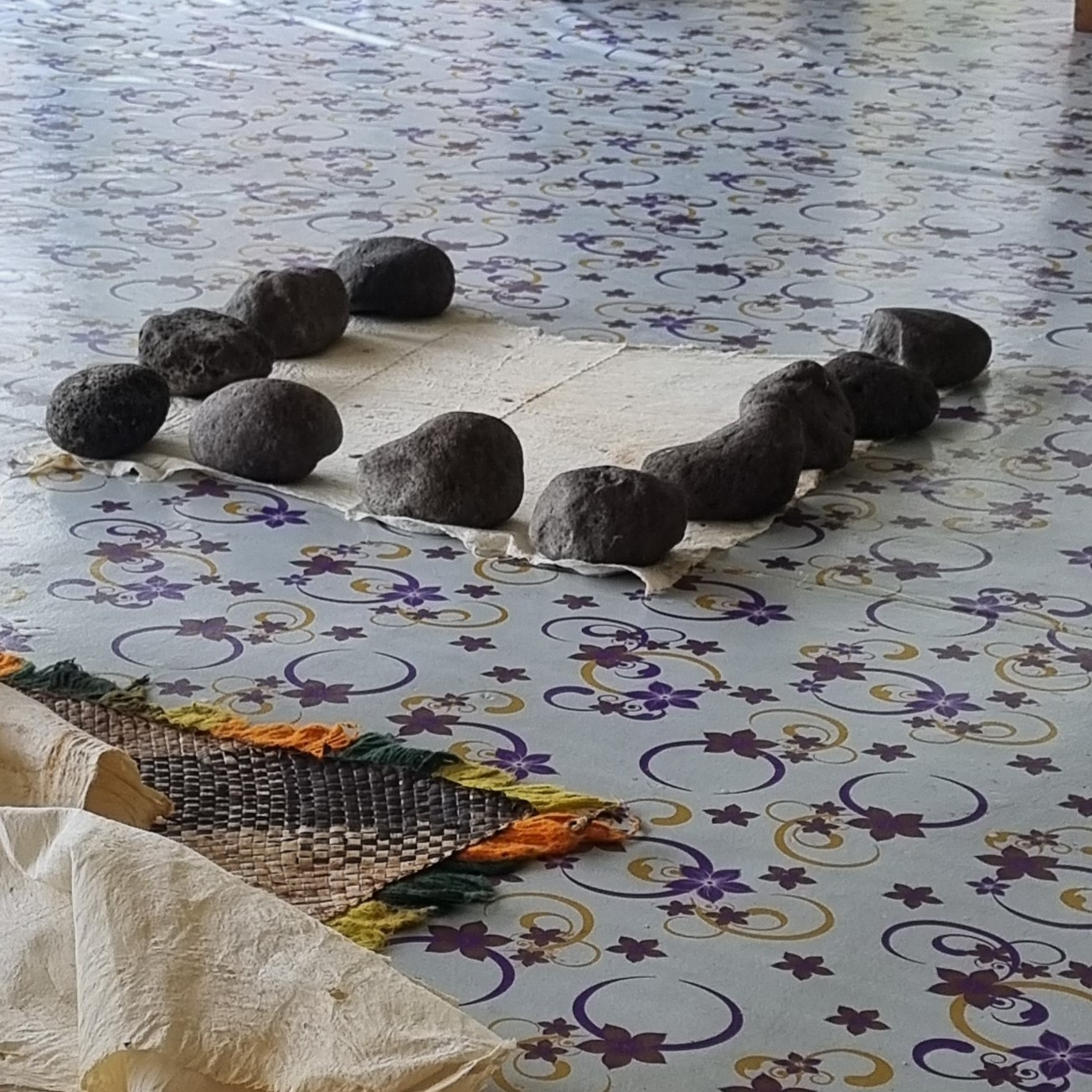
The fabric is laid out to dry before it is decorated.

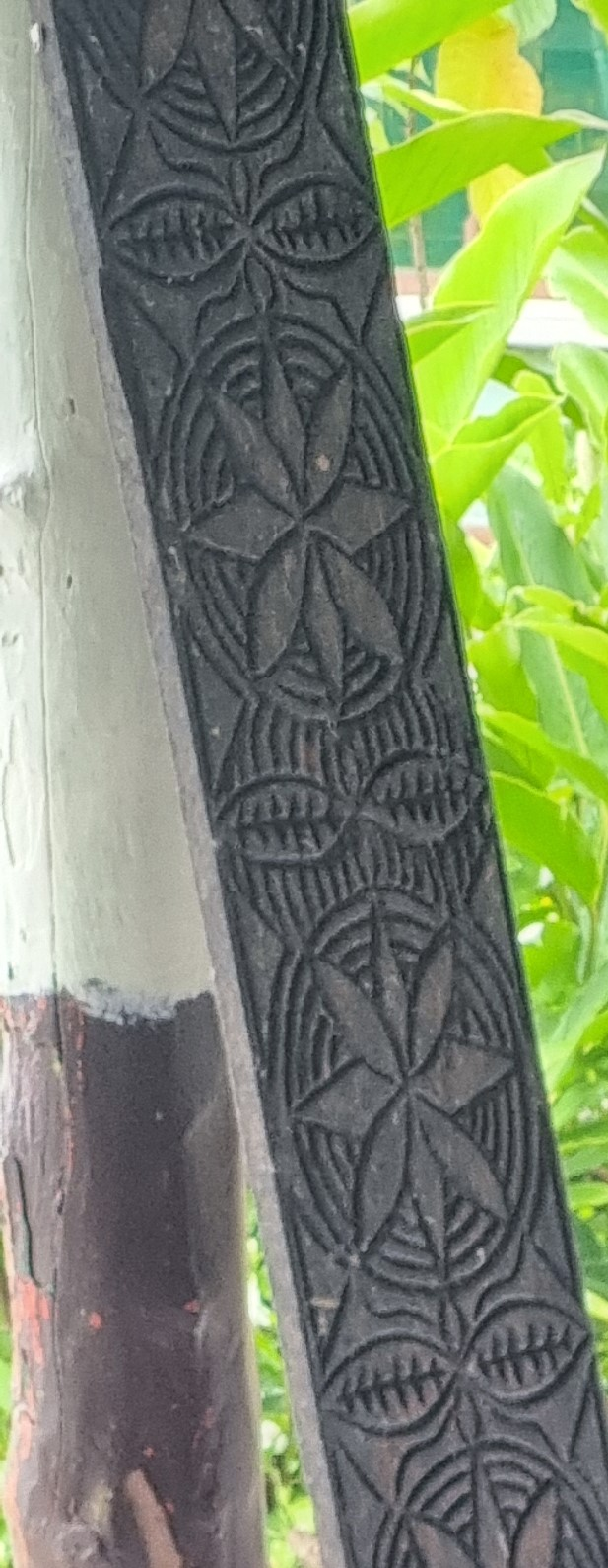
Upeti

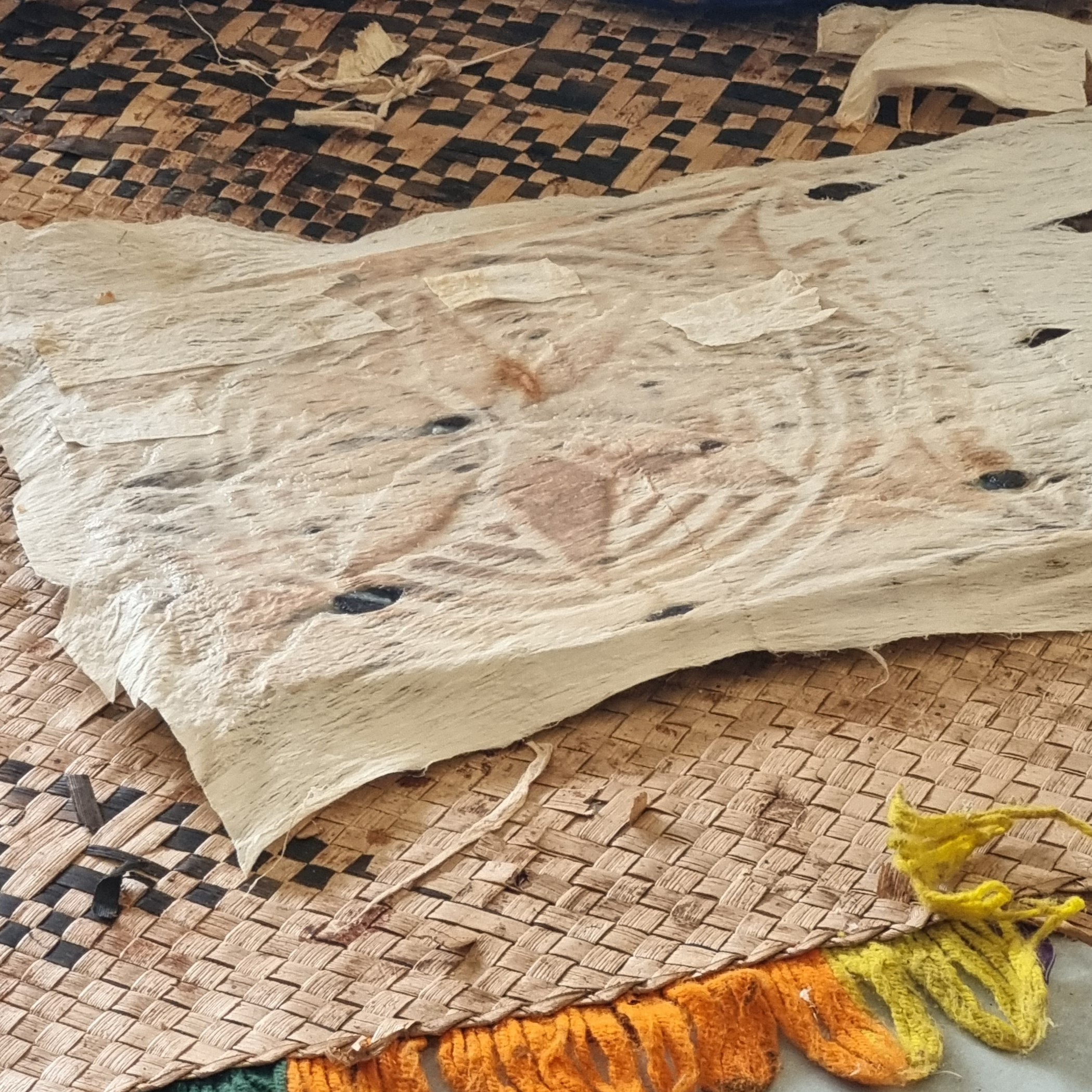
Holes in the rubbed fabric are patched before another layer is placed on top

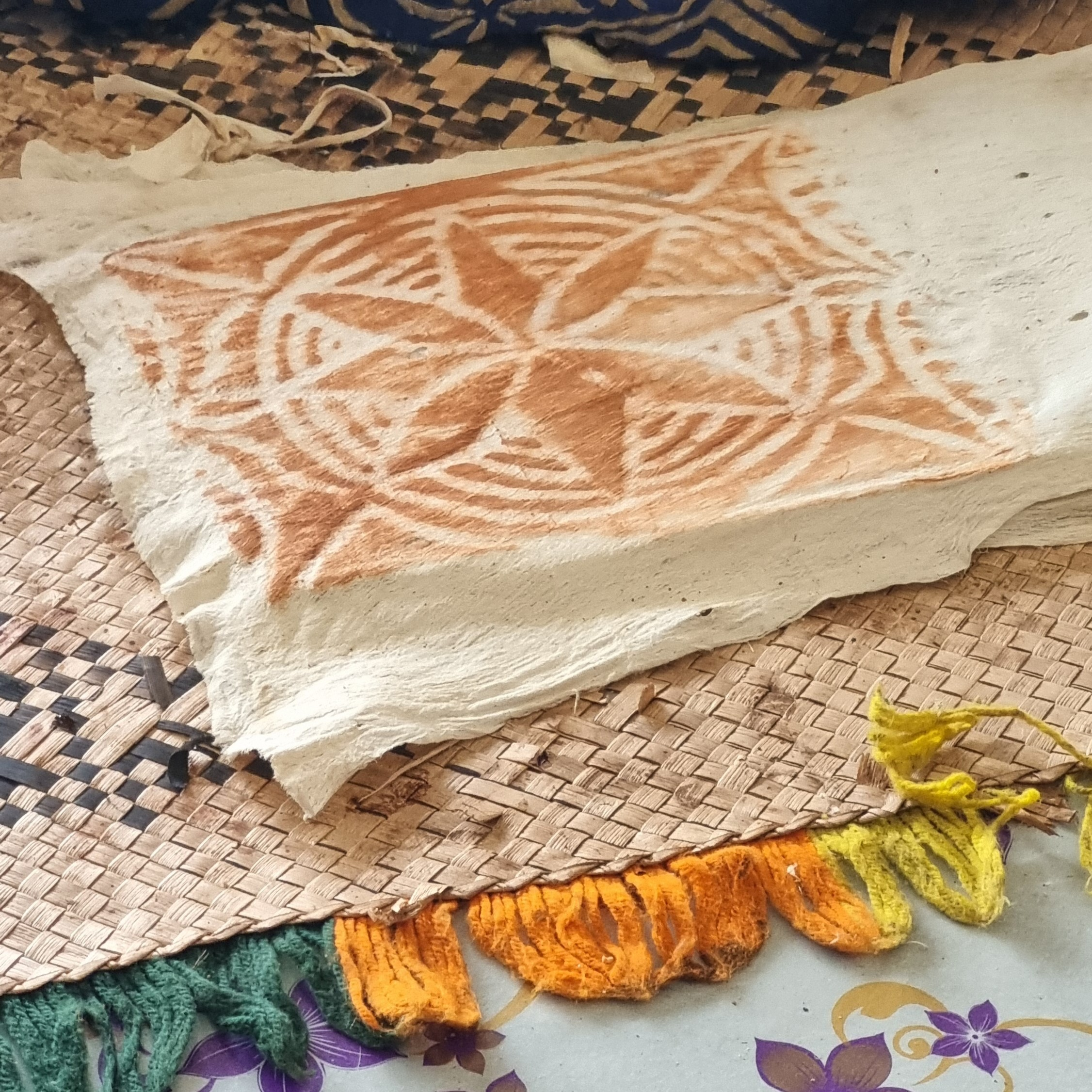
Powdered clay dabbed over the design darkens the pattern.

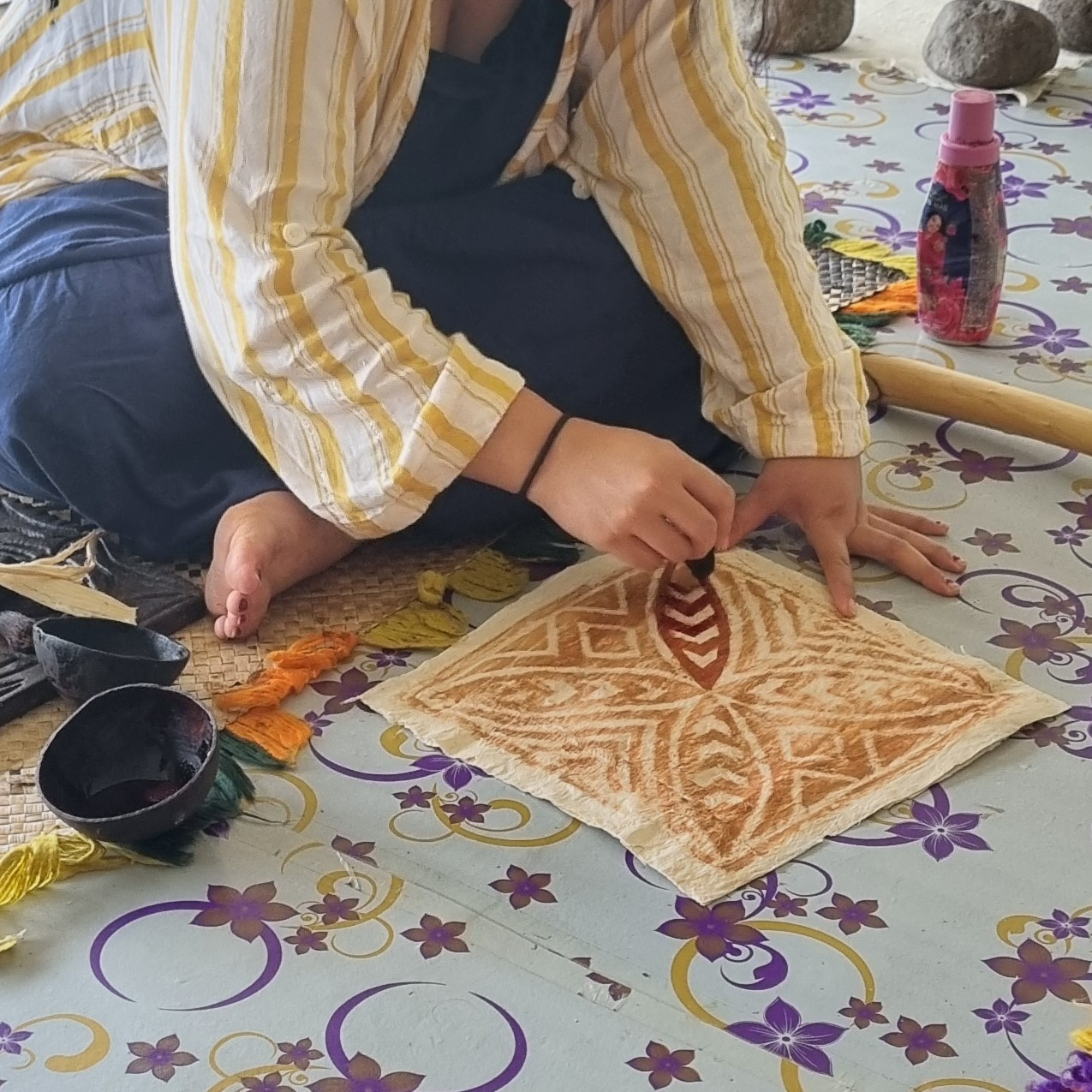
Painting details onto the dried piece.

=== Fiji ===
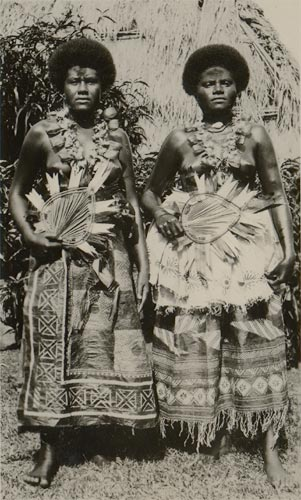
Fijian women in ceremonial dress including masi skirts, 1935.

In Fiji tapa is known as masi and is made only by women, although at Navatusila, men have been involved in decorating masi.

Paper mulberry trees (masi) are grown in gardens by individual families. When the tree is about 12 months old and the trunk is about 3 cm in diameter, it is cut down. The bark is stripped off and the inner bark (lewena) separated from the outer bark. The inner bark is then beaten on a wooden anvil (dudua) with a square-sided wooden mallet (ike). Up to four layers may be felted together to create a piece of masi, and large sheets are created by gluing sections together with a paste made from arrowroot or cassava. Immature trees are used to provide a fine, thin, white, single-layer cloth (seavu) used by chiefs.

Traditionally, masi was used for men's clothing, bedding, curtains, masks and presentation cloths on ceremonial occasions such as weddings or the conferring of a chiefly title. Masi was popular with foreign collectors in the late nineteenth and early twentieth centuries, but today is made regularly in only a few locations, particularly Moce (Lau province in eastern Fiji) and Vatulele (Nadroga province in western Fiji). In other communities it is created according to local demand. Today, masi is used for clothing, turbans, wall art, bedding, ceremonial gifts and tourist items. Large pieces of masi are given as gifts to show the "cultural strength" and power of a family or clan.

The method of decoration varies from place to place, and has changed over time. Different kinds of masi include masi kesa (stencilled), masi kuvui (brown or smoked), masi vulavula (white or plain), and masi vakarerega (yellow). The colours used show a person's rank: white or brown masi is used by people of chiefly background. Dyes come from natural materials: brown from the inner bark of the mangrove, and black from the bark of a tree and soot. A brown clay called umea is mixed with the dyes to act as a fixative. Turmeric produces a yellow-orange colour. Stencils were traditionally made from banana or pandanus leaves but today plastic stencils (often made from x-ray film) are used. Stencilling of masi practiced in Fiji since at least the 1840s appears to be unique in the Pacific. The technique of rubbing in a design using a carved board (kupeti) was used on large sheets of masi in the Lau islands. It was probably introduced from Tonga in the 18th century. Cloth made with this technique was used in chiefly rituals. Patterns used on masi reference the natural environment, including barracuda teeth and frangipani and hibiscus flowers. Another popular design is inspired by the traditional Fijian comb or iseru. Concentric ovals represent people working together, and zigzagging lines represent comfortable relaxation.

=== Tahiti ===
Tapa cloth production in Tahiti was meticulously documented by 18th century Western voyagers such as Sydney Parkinson and Joseph Banks among the entourage for James Cook's first voyage around Polynesia in 1769. Cloth made from Ficus tinctoria was water resistant and reserved for ariʻi, while lower classes made do with coarser cloth from the bark of breadfruit trees. All materials were processed with beaters made of Casuarina equisetifolia (toa) wood: a piece of fabric was usually formed in three-ply. Patches on any gaps in the expanded fabrics were applied with pia starch, also used for the finishing coat. Dyes were bound to fabric by soaking in an infusion of candlenut tree bark. Tapa patterns original to Tahitians were simple and annular designs stamped with bamboo, but English cloth traded to them during James Cook's voyage led to an innovation of new patterns by imprinting leaves with dyes to reproduce the English patterns in a similar manner.

=== Cook Islands ===
Traditional tapa manufacture in the Cook Islands was more complex than in other parts of Polynesia, and there were differences in style and usage between different islands. This reflected continuous contact with other island groups as well as settlement of the Cook Islands by groups from different homelands including Tahiti, Samoa and Tonga. Cook Islands tapa is created in one layer after retting for several days, and the fabric is generally thicker and stronger than that from Tahiti. By the 1880s tapa was rarely used in clothing, replaced by imported fabric and clothing from locally-grown cotton. It was used until the 1920s for masks, dance costumes and ceremonies, particularly on Mangaia. Tapa making in the Cook Islands decreased from the early twentieth century and is now rarely produced. Anthropologist Peter Buck (aka Te Rangi Hiroa) described the following process of tapa-making on Mangaia in a 1944 publication.

Cook Islands tapa was made from the paper mulberry tree, known as the aute or anga, or the breadfruit tree (kuru). A coarse brown cloth was also made from the aerial roots of the banyan tree (aoa). Typically, tapa manufacture was women's work, although in Mangaia men made a special white cloth called autea or tikoru, which was used as a covering for the gods and as clothing for high chiefs and priests.

Paper mulberry saplings would be cut when they were about one inch in diameter and the bark peeled off in one long strip. The inner bark was separated from the outer bark with a clam shell (ka'i) and soaked in fresh or salt water for 24 hours. Then the bark was beaten with a wooden mallet (ike) made from ironwood or miro, which had grooves of varying closeness on each of its four sides. The ike was used with a wooden anvil (tutunga). Several women might work side by side at a long anvil, chanting as they beat the tapa. Signals could be conveyed by beating the ike on the tutunga, for example letting the rest of the village know that a visitor had arrived. After the first beating, the bark strips were washed in fresh water to remove salt, sap and any green remnants of the outer bark. This differs from the Samoan process, where the bark is scraped with a shell. The cleaned strip of bark was then left for a day to drain before being wrapped in banana or taro leaves for three days in a form of retting to soften the fibres. A second beating then took place. Sections could be overlapped and felted together by beating to form larger pieces. This differs from the process in Tonga and Samoa, where tapa was made in two layers and pieces were glued together . After the second beating the cloth was spread out flat to dry. It could be used in its natural white state, or dyed.

Tapa could also be made from shoots of the breadfruit tree, but this was grayish-brown and coarser than paper mulberry tapa.

Coloured tapa was called parai or pa'oa. Dyes were made from various plants to produce yellow, red and black. Black (which would eventually fade to brown) was also obtained by soaking the fabric in mud. Yellow was obtained from turmeric (renga), nono, or kavapiu. Red came from mati berries or candlenut bark (tuitui). Black came from soaking the tapa in the black mud of a taro swamp or in candlenut juice and ironwood juice then heating it in an earth oven. The tapa could be coloured by immersing it in dye, rubbing dye on to the fabric, stamping it or painting designs on to it. Tapa from Aitutaki was some of the most colourful produced in the Cook Islands, using combinations of orange from turmeric and pinkish-red from mati berries.

Traditional patterns included "rows of small squares with borders staggered brickwork-fashion; borders infilled with chevrons; broad columns of zigzags (either white on black or vice versa); or broad columns of white diamonds interspersed with cross-hatched hourglass-shapes (or again, vice versa)".

=== New Zealand ===
Māori oral history and other evidence shows that Māori in the warmer northern half of the North Island (Auckland, Waikato, Haurarki, the Bay of Plenty and the East Coast) knew about or made bark cloth (known as aute) from paper mulberry trees and perhaps also from local trees such as lacebark. The modern Māori word hiako meaning 'skin, hide, bark, rind or peel' is presumably cognate with the Samoan siapo and Niuean hiapo, which are words for tapa or barkcloth in those languages.

The paper mulberry tree (known as aute) was brought from the Pacific to New Zealand by early Polynesian settlers. Writing in 1880, Colenso stated that the aute tree was seen to be widely grown at the time of Captain Cook's arrival in 1769 but had become extinct by the 1840s. Cook and his contemporaries observed that chiefs wore small white pieces of aute barkcloth in their hair. Colenso states that Māori did not make clothing from the aute, but used it to make paper kites. Early Māori made clothing and mats from flax (Phormium tenax, known as harakeke) instead of barkcloth. No tapa anvils have been identified in New Zealand, but some beaters have been discovered in the areas where aute was known to grow. The only known specimens of tapa cloth found in New Zealand were discovered in Otago, which is far from the presumed areas of manufacture Possibly the barkcloth found was made from native trees and not the aute or paper mulberry, or it may have been brought to New Zealand from elsewhere. Largely unsuccessful attempts have been made to use DNA analysis of tapa cloth to determine which plants were used.

Experimental archaeology on reviving the techniques of aute production was pioneered in the 2010s by Māori artist Nikau Hindin, a former student of Hawaiian Studies at the University of Hawaiʻi at Mānoa.

=== Niue ===
Niuean tapa is known as hiapo. Samoan missionaries brought [Samoan] siapo with them to Niue in the 1830s. In the 1880s a new style developed with a fine free-hand decoration, possibly created by a single community.

Hiapo has not been produced in Niue since the early 1900s. Surviving samples show that hiapo was decorated with freehand painting, not rubbing or stencilling. Designs include rectangular or circular designs, with abstract plant forms, people, stars and fish. The purpose served by Niuean hiapo is largely unknown. Hiapo beaters are called ike in Niue.

=== Hawaii ===
Tapa made in Hawaii is known as kapa. Traditionally, it was made from the paper mulberry tree and other trees, with the bark being beaten with a four-sided beater on a stone anvil. Kapa making was usually done by women. Kapa was used for clothing, bed covers and banners.

=== Sulawesi ===
Barkcloth in Sulawesi, Indonesia is called "fuya", and has been used for major rites such as puberty, marriage, death, for at least 4000 years. Its manufacture is nearly extinct in Indonesia. The Weltmuseum collection in Vienna holds hundreds of barkcloth coverings, which claims that its use declined over time due to Christianization, Islamicization, modernization, and the prevalence of washable woven textiles such as batik.

== Gallery ==
Examples of Tapa Cloth

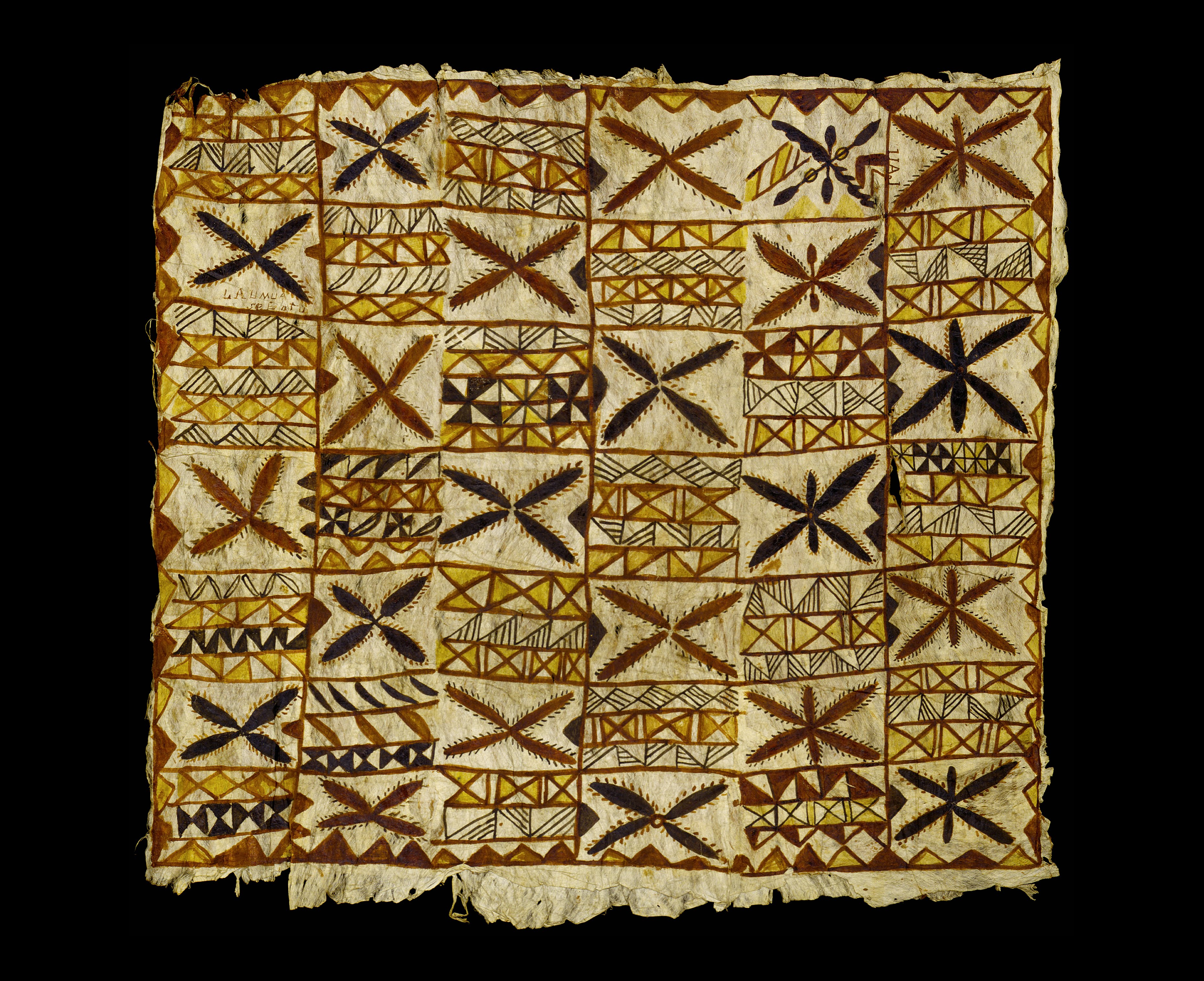
Siapo mamanu (tapa cloth), 1890s, Samoa (Te Papa, Wellington)

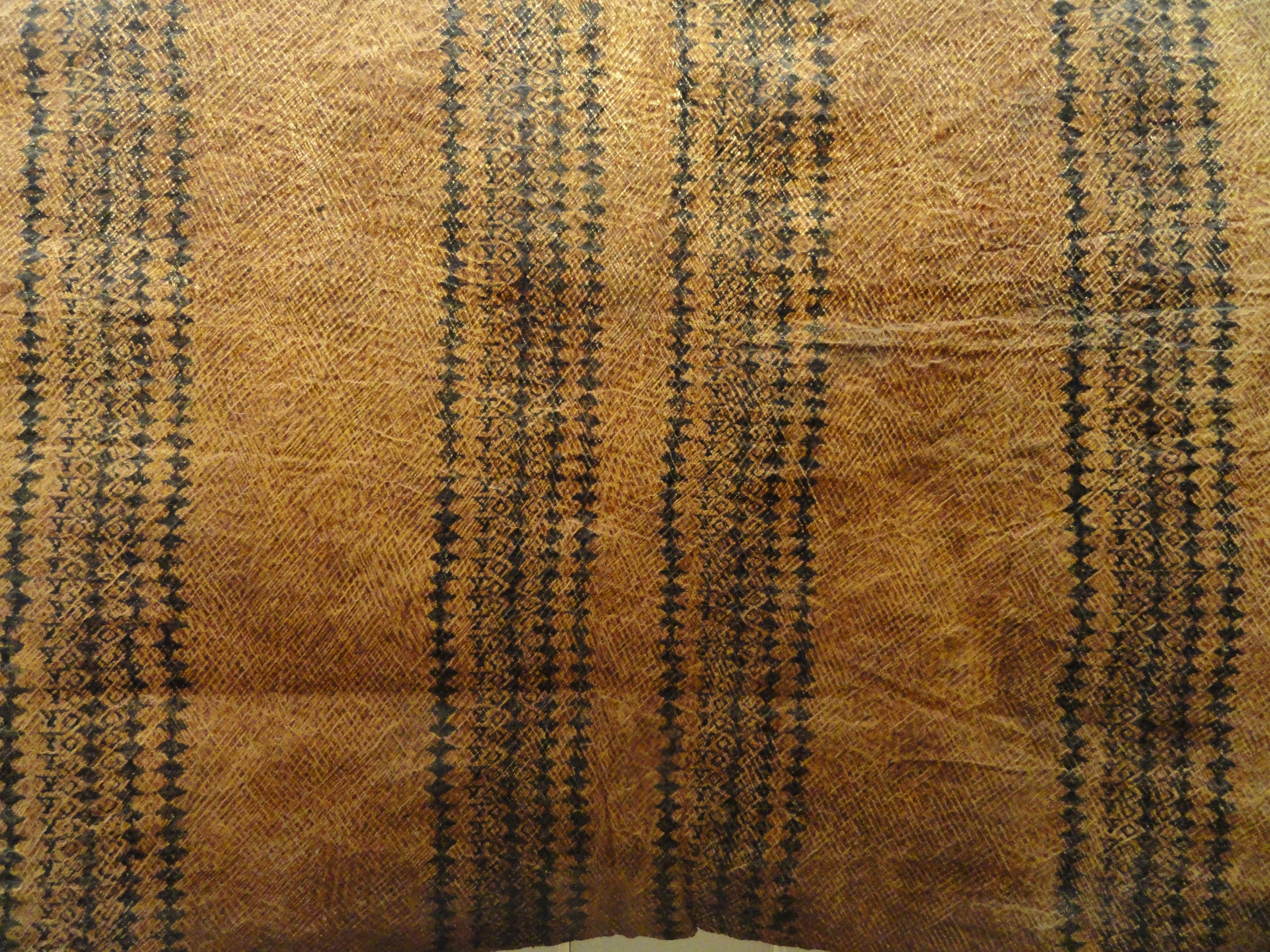
Kapa (tapa cloth), pre-1890, Hawaii (The Peabody Museum of Archaeology and Ethnology, Massachusetts)

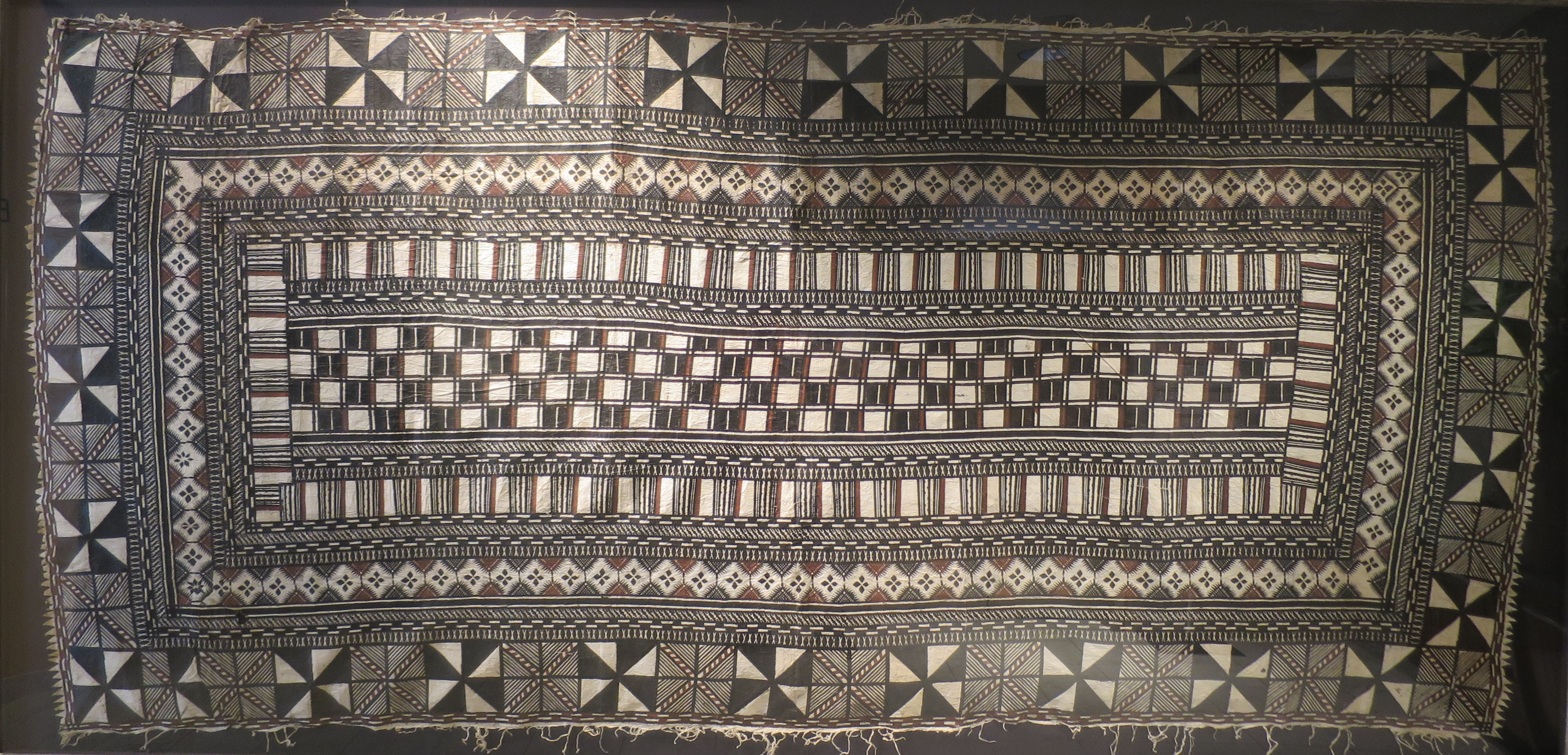
Masi (tapa cloth), 1800s, Fiji (Neiman Marcus Art Collection, Honolulu)

== Notable tapa craftspeople ==
- Mauatua
- Teraura
- John Pule
- 'Ahu Sistas: Meralda Warren, Jean Clarkson, Pauline Reynolds and Sue Pearson

== See also ==
- Barkcloth
- I-sala, Fijian barkcloth headscarves
- Lacebark
- Lamba
- Lava-lava
- A catalogue of the different specimens of cloth collected in the three voyages of Captain Cook, to the Southern Hemisphere

== General sources ==
- Pule, J and Thomas, N. Hiapo: past and present in Niuean Barkcloth Dunedin, University of Otago Press, 2005.
- Arkinstall, Patricia Lorraine, “A study of bark cloth from Hawaii, Samoa, Tonga and Fiji: An exploration of the regional development of distinctive styles of bark cloth and its relationship to other cultural factors”, Ithaca, N.Y., 1966.
- Brigham, William Tufts, “Ka hana kapa, making of bark-cloth in Hawaii”, Honolulu, Bishop Museum Press, 1911.
- ʻI.F. Helu; Critical essays: Cultural perspectives from the Southseas; 1999
- Kaeppler, Adrienne Lois, “The fabrics of Hawaii (bark cloth)”, Leigh-on-Sea, F. Lewis, 1975.
- Leonard, Anne, and Terrell, John, "Patterns of Paradise: The styles and significance of bark cloth around the world", Field Museum of Natural History, Chicago USA, 1980.
- Neich, Roger and Pendergrast, Mick, "Pacific Tapa", University of Hawai'i Press, Honolulu, 1997.
- Winter, Joan G., "Talking Tapa: Pasifika Bark Cloth in Queensland", Keeaira Press, Southport QLD, 2009.
- Aldridge, Richard and Hamson, Michael, "Art of the Massim & Collingwood Bay", Michael Hamson, Palos Verdes, CA, 2009.
- Meyer, Anthony J. P., "Les Tapa funéraires des Nakanai de Nouvelle-Bretagne (The funerary tapa-cloths of the Nakanai from New Britain)", Series: Océanie-Oceania No. 11.", Galerie Meyer, Paris 1992
- Kooijman, Simon, "Ornamented bark-cloth in Indonesia", Series: Mededelingen van het Rijksmuseum voor Volkenkunde, Leiden, No. 16. Leiden, E. J. Brill, 1963.
- Meurant, Georges, and Thompson, Robert Farris, "Mbuti Design: Paintings by Pygmy Women of the Ituri Forest", Thames & Hudson, 1996.
- Wright, Margot, "Barkcloth: Aspects of Preparation, Use, Deterioration, Conservation and Display (Conservators of Ethnographic Artefacts)", Archetype Books, 2001.
- Richards, Rhys, "Not Quite Extinct: Melanesian Barkcloth ('Tapa') from Western Solomon Islands", Paremata Press, 2005.
- Goldman, Irving, "The Cubeo: Indians of the Northwest Amazon", University of Illinois Press, 1979.
- Arbeit, Wendy, "Tapa in Tonga", University of Hawaii Press, Honolulu, 1995.
