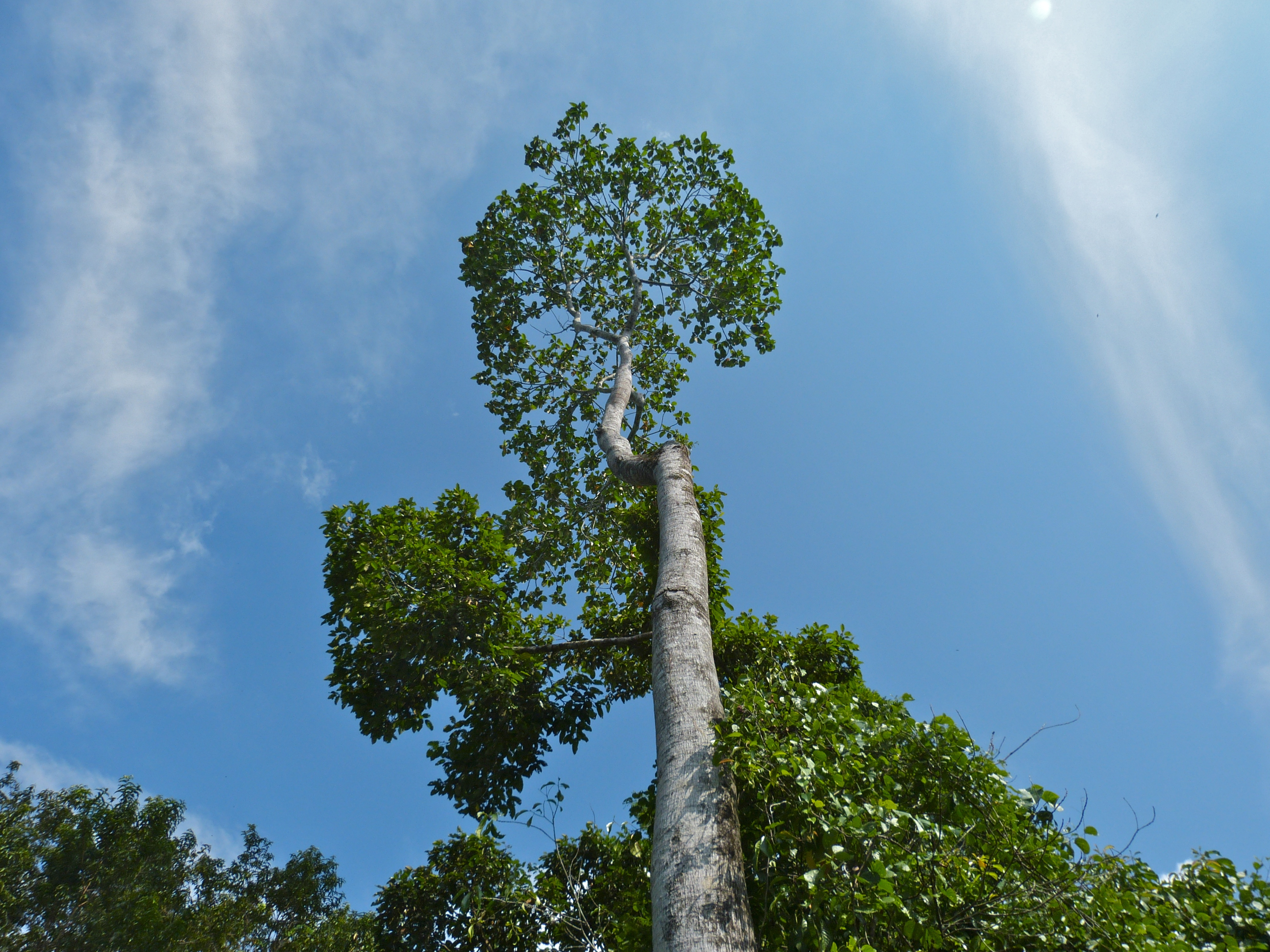

Conservation status
- Vulnerable (IUCN 3.1)

Scientific classification
- Kingdom: Plantae
- Clade: Tracheophytes
- Clade: Angiosperms
- Clade: Eudicots
- Clade: Rosids
- Order: Rosales
- Family: Moraceae
- Genus: Artocarpus
- Species: A. tamaran

Binomial name
- Artocarpus tamaran Becc.

= Artocarpus tamaran =

Species of flowering plant

Artocarpus tamaran, also known as elephant jack in English, tarap tempunan in Malay, and more locally as timbangan, tamaran, entawa or wi yang, is a species of flowering plant, a fruit tree in the fig family, that is native to Southeast Asia.

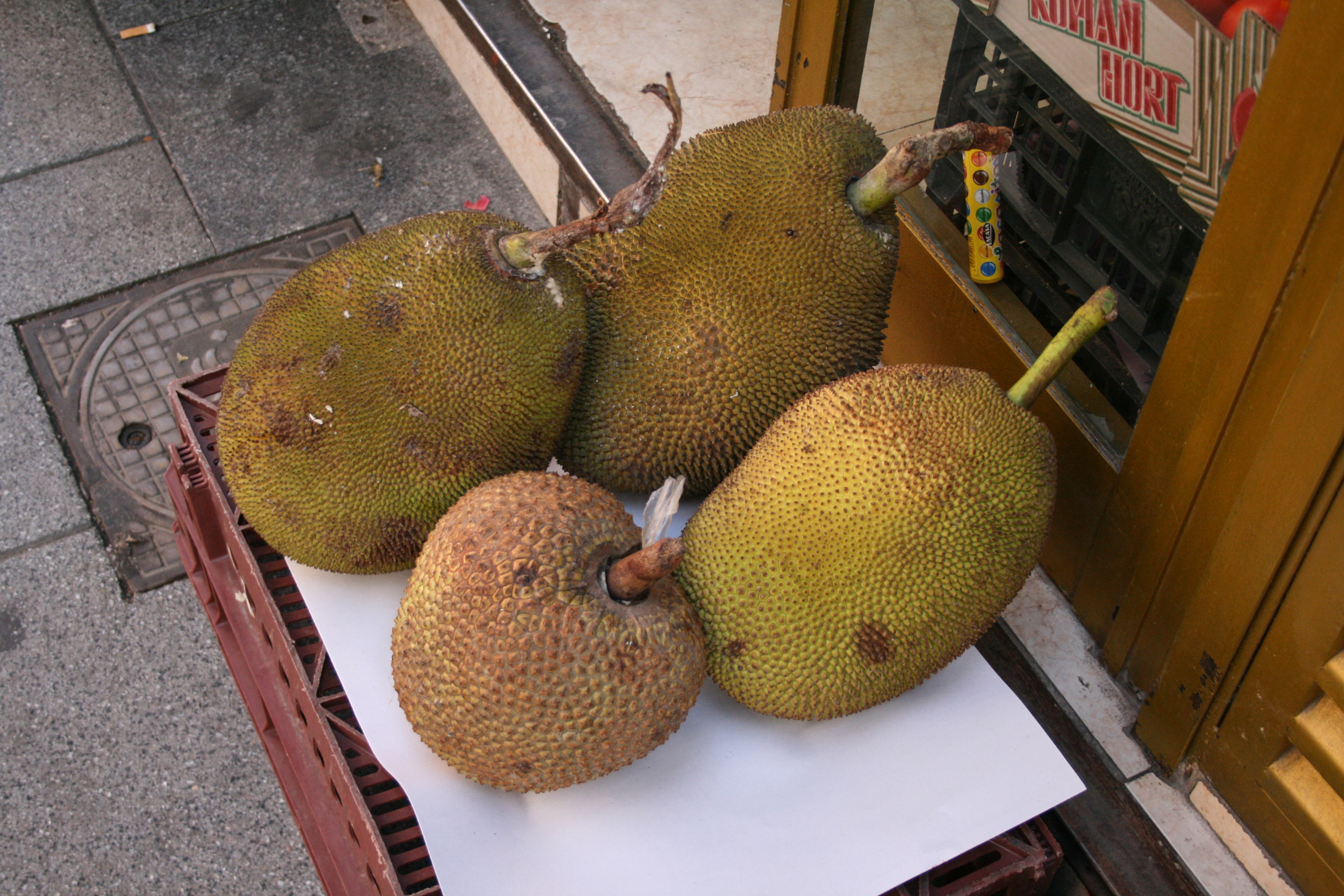
Fruits

== Description ==
The species grows as a monoecious tree to 40 m in height, with a bole of up to 10 m, buttresses to 3 m, and with white latex. The oval leaves are 27–35 cm long by 10–18 cm wide. The globular inflorescences occur in the leaf axils. The fruits are cylindrical or oblong syncarpous infructescences, 10–15 cm by 5 cm in diameter, covered by short, flexible spines, and ripening yellowish. The seeds are covered by an edible, sweet, white aril.

== Distribution and habitat ==
The species is endemic to Borneo, where it occurs naturally in lowland, coastal and hill mixed dipterocarp forest, as well as in secondary forest, up to an elevation of 600 m.

== Usage ==
The fruits of this species are eaten. The bark was once extensively used for making barkcloth by the Muruts and other Borneo tribal people.
