= A catalogue of the different specimens of cloth collected in the three voyages of Captain Cook, to the Southern Hemisphere =

1787 book by Alexander Shaw

A catalogue of Tapa cloth collected in the three voyages of Captain Cook, 1787
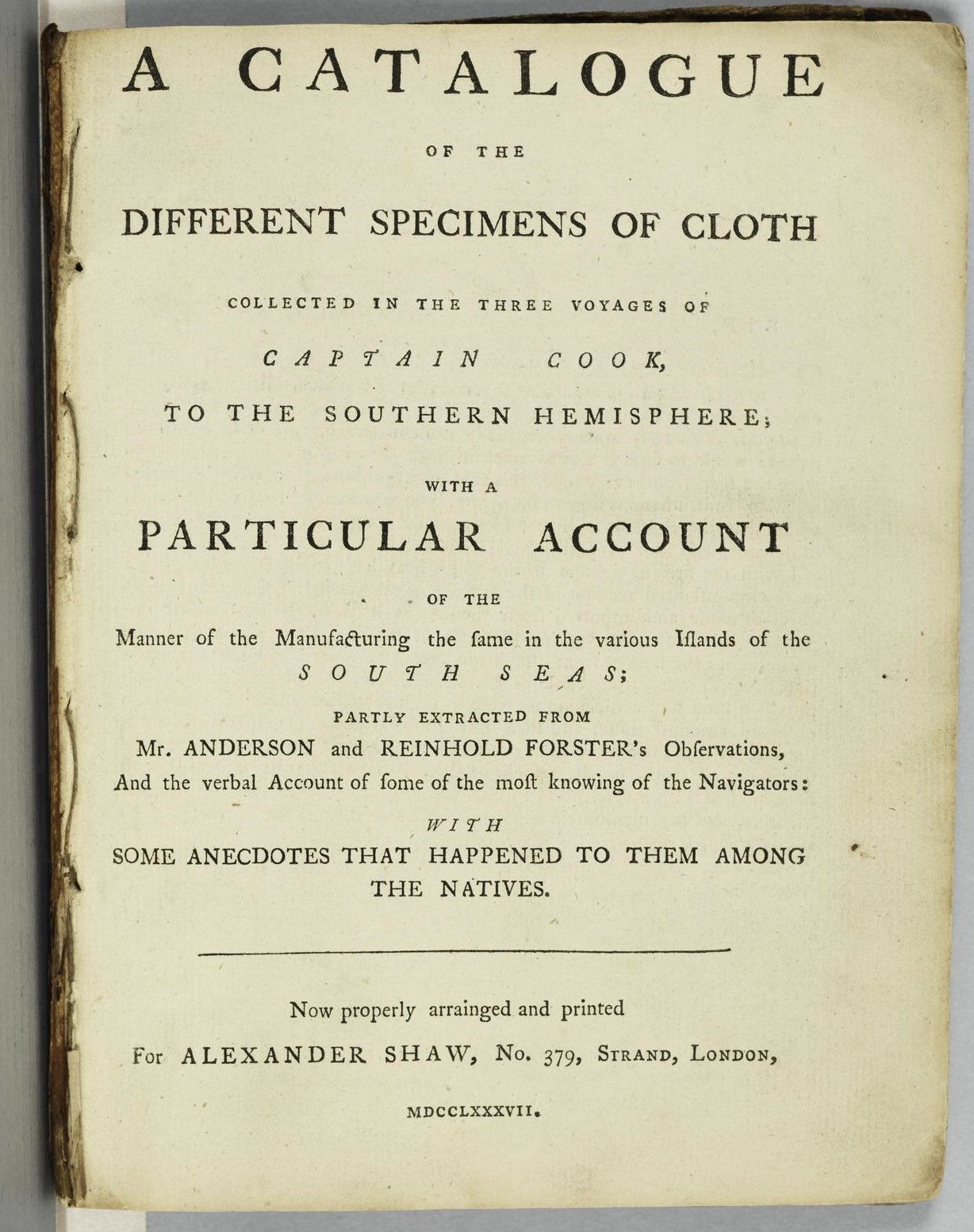
- Title page of Catalogue of Tapa Cloth, 1787
- Author: Alexander H. Shaw
- Language: English
- Genre: Reference works
- Published: 1787 & 1804-1806
- Publisher: Alexander Shaw, no. 379, Strand, London
- Publication place: United Kingdom
- Media type: Print/samples
- Pages: varies

A catalogue of the different specimens of cloth collected in the three voyages of Captain Cook, to the Southern Hemisphere : with a particular account of the manner of manufacturing the same in the various islands of the South Seas : partly extracted from Mr. Anderson and Reinhold Forster's observations, and the verbal account of some of the most knowing of the navigators : with some anecdotes that happened to them among the natives, is a 1787 book cataloguing examples of Pacific tapa cloth collected by James Cook on his first, second and third voyages through the South Pacific 1768–1780.

== Background and publication ==
Tapa cloth made using a variety of plants was collected by Captain James Cook on all three of his voyages through the Pacific. The locations represented in these published collections are mainly Tahiti, Mo'orea, Raiatea, Bora Bora, Huahine, New Zealand, Easter Island, the Marquesas Islands, Fiji, Tonga, Hawaii and an example from Jamaica. The book was published by Alexander Shaw and each copy contains original tapa cloth samples inserted directly onto the pages or attached to the binding as pages. The number of samples and the cloth itself varies in each copy of the book. As of 2015 there are about 66 known examples of the book known to exist.

Little is known of Shaw's early life but he did serve for 27 years as an army officer before retiring on half-pay. After this Shaw set himself up as a bookdealer, and dealer of natural history specimens who published the first issue of this book from a shop at number 139 The Strand, London. By the time of his death at Damhead, Justice Mills, on 22 July 1807, it was reported in the Aberdeen Journal that he had been living in the vicinity of Aberdeen and Edinburgh for a 'good many years.' This seems to imply that the second issue of the book may have been made by Shaw while living in Scotland.

== Content ==
Three issues of the book are thought to have been published. The ‘first issue,’ usually containing 38-39 specimens, appeared in 1787 (with no paper watermarks). Around 1805–06, a ‘second issue’ was made with text sheets left over from the original printing and usually 56 specimens (with larger samples) and watermarks (1803–1806). A third issue - represented by the State Library of New South Wales copy DSM/C525 - contains completely different cloth specimens from the first two editions. It has also been suggested that the tapa cloth samples used in the two issues were from different sources, and in the case of the second issue may have been sourced from the sale of the contents of the Leverian collection in 1806.

== Reception and legacy ==
Following the death of James Cook the publishing of material relating to his three voyages was almost an industry unto itself and A catalogue of the different specimens of cloth remains one of the more unusual. Produced in very limited numbers the book is a hybrid publication, part text and part unique specimens. Shaw's original intention for the book may have been to attract patronage and recognition rather than financial gain.

The collections made during Cook's three voyages represent the first extensive contact between European and Pacific cultures and these tapa specimens, while not always the result of first contact, remain significant as they are among the first collections to have been identified and studied. They are also important due to the sharp decline in tapa production in the Pacific following Cook's voyages.

== Collections ==
The following list has been compiled from, Donald Kerr, Census of Alexander Shaw's Catalogue of the Different Specimens of Cloth Collected in the Three Voyages of Captain Cook, 2015.

- Alexander Turnbull Library - REng CATA 1787
- Auckland Public Library - 910.4 S53; Mackelvie No. M67
- Auckland War Memorial Museum Tāmaki Paenga Hira - 1514 (Cat ID)
- Bishop Museum - no catalogue number
- Bibliothèque nationale de France - RES 8-P2-106
- British Library - C.112.e.1
- British Museum - Oc1903,-.147.a
- British Museum - Oc1903,-.147.b
- British Museum - Oc1903,-.147.c
- Durham County Record Office - D/St/Y9/10
- Field Museum of Natural History - Rare Book Room Gen. 1787.10
- Glasgow University Library - Sp. Coll. Hunterian K. 5. 22
- Hawaii State Archives - Cook 215
- Hawaii State Archives - Kahn 02/38
- Indiana University - G420 .C75 A5 Vault
- Kelton Foundation - Collection No. PAC51
- Museum of New Zealand Te Papa Tongarewa - RB001400
- National Gallery of Australia - no reference number
- National Library of Australia - SR COOK 44 (SR2) -
- National Library of Australia - SRq COOK 14
- National Library of Australia - PIC MS 569
- National Library of Australia - NLA FERG 7143
- National Library of Scotland - Bi.4/2.52
- National Museums Scotland Library - ATTIC TC COO: Acc No. 3447.1
- National Museums Scotland - A.1074
- National Museums Scotland - ATTIC TS COO / Acc No 3447.2
- New-York Historical Society - Y1787 .Cat
- Peabody Essex Museum - 995 S534a
- Peabody Essex Museum - 995 S534b
- Peabody Essex Museum - 995 S534c
- Peabody Essex Museum - 995 S534d
- Royal BC Museum Archives - Library NWs 970P C771G C3 1887
- Royal Ontario Museum - Rare Book, GN432. C66 1787
- South Australian Museum - M572.9969
- State Library of New South Wales - DSM/C 524
- State Library of New South Wales - DSM/C 525
- State Library of New South Wales - C526
- State Library of New South Wales - SAFE/78/64
- State Library of New South Wales - SAFE/78/65
- State Library of New South Wales - SAFE/C 523 (Safe 1/240)
- State Library of South Australia - Special Collection 677.54 S534
- State Library of South Australia - no reference number
- State Library of Queensland - RBJ 746.041CAT
- State Library of Victoria - RARELT 910.41 C77CA
- The Textile Museum - R746.196 C357
- Tyne & Wear Archives & Museums - no reference number
- University of Aberdeen - ABDUA 36921
- University of California, Los Angeles - YRL Special Collections G247.C28
- University of Edinburgh - RB.S.1016. (previously O*.25.27)
- University of Hawaiʻi at Mānoa - Pacific Rare GN 432. C38
- University of Manchester - JRL R17514
- University of Melbourne - SpC/GRIM 910.41 CATA
- University of Michigan - C 1787 Sh
- University of Minnesota - 1787 Ca
- University of Oxford - Douce C subt. 198
- University of Oxford, Pitt Rivers Museum - 1908.28.1
- University of Pennsylvania Museum of Archaeology and Anthropology - Penn Museum 87–3–1.
- University of Pennsylvania Museum of Archaeology and Anthropology - Penn Museum 87-3-2
