= Barkcloth =

Type of non-woven textile

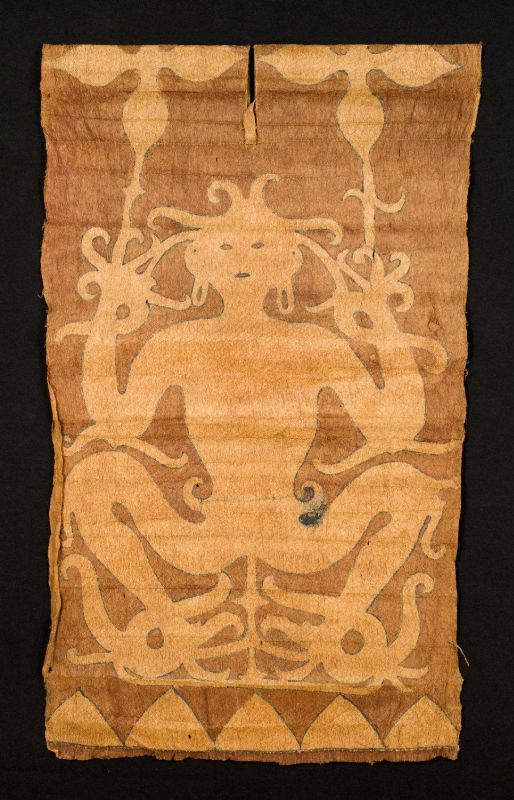
Barkcloth jacket from Kalimantan, Indonesia

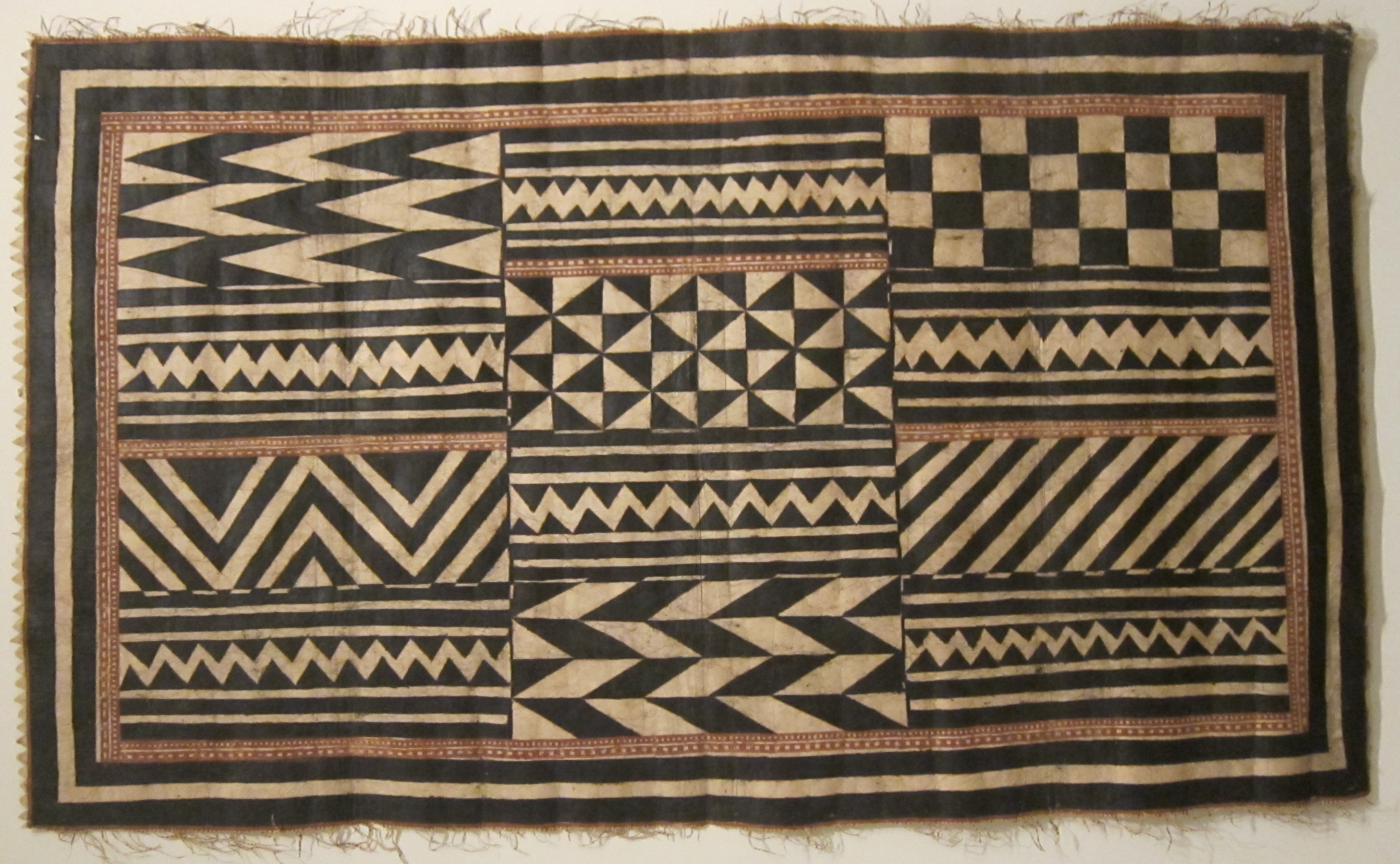
Fijian masi

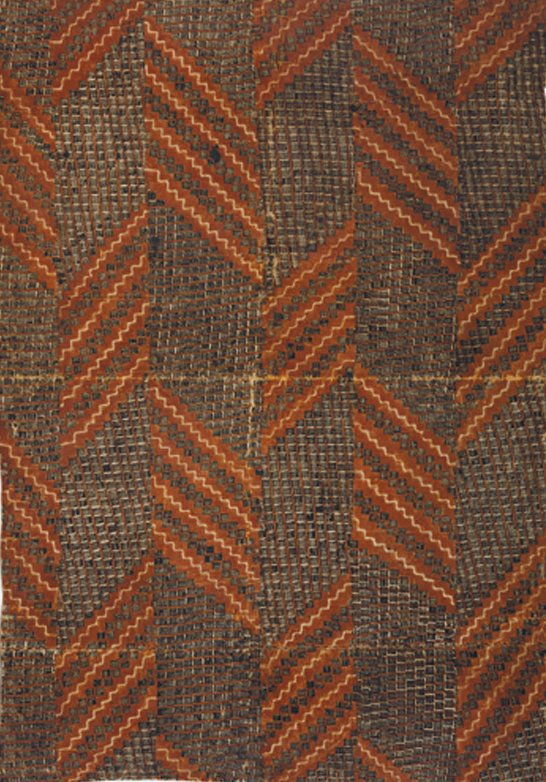
Hawaiian kapa from the 18th century

Barkcloth or bark cloth is a versatile material that was once common in Asia, Africa, and the Pacific. Barkcloth comes primarily from trees of the family Moraceae, including Broussonetia papyrifera, Artocarpus altilis, Artocarpus tamaran, and Ficus natalensis. It is made by beating sodden strips of the fibrous inner bark of these trees into sheets, which are then finished into a variety of items. Many texts that mention "paper clothing" are actually referring to barkcloth.

Some modern cotton-based fabrics are also named "barkcloth" for their resemblance to these traditional fabrics.

== Traditional ==
=== Ainu ===
While woven, traditional Ainu bark cloth is produced similarly before spinning to other barkcloths. It is produced largely from fibers of the lobed elm.

=== Austronesia ===
Before the development of woven textiles, barkcloth made from trees belonging to the mulberry family (Moraceae) were an important aspect of the pre-Austronesian and Austronesian material culture during the Neolithic period. Stone barkcloth beaters, in particular, are considered part of the "Austronesian toolkit." They have been found in abundance in the Pearl River basin in Southern China, which is considered to be part of the homelands of the Austronesian peoples before they started migrating into islands during the Austronesian expansion (c.3000 to 1500 BC). The oldest example, found in the Dingmo Site in Guangxi, has been dated back to ~5900 BC. They were spread along with Austronesian voyagers into Island Southeast Asia, Oceania (with the notable exception of Micronesia), and Madagascar. Genetic studies on the paper mulberry populations in the Pacific have all confirmed close genealogical ties to populations in Taiwan and Southern China.

Though they exist in abundance in archaeological sites in Island Southeast Asia, barkcloth have largely disappeared in the region as they were replaced by woven textiles. But they survived until around the 19th century in the outlying regions of the Austronesian expansion, particularly in Island Melanesia and Polynesia, as well as the interior highlands of Borneo. Some communities in Southeast Asia are reviving this practice. At Monbang traditional village on Alor Island, Indonesia, tourists can see members of the Kabola ethnic group wear barkcloth and dance traditional dances.

=== Indonesia ===
In addition to Sulawesi tapa cloth, daluang is produced in Java from paper mulberry bark, also called "kulit kayu", for sarongs, tunics, headgear, and other items. Daluang features prominently in wayang performance, particularly wayang beber.

Barkcloth in Sulawesi, Indonesia is called "fuya", and has been used for major rites such as puberty, marriage, death, for at least 4000 years. Its manufacture is nearly extinct in Indonesia. The Weltmuseum collection in Vienna holds hundreds of barkcloth coverings, which claims that its use declined over time due to Christianization, Islamicization, modernization, and the prevalence of washable woven textiles.

=== Uganda ===
Production of barkcloth in Uganda. Freshly peeled inner bark. 2026 photo

Barkcloth has been manufactured in Buganda, Uganda, for centuries and is Uganda's sole representative on the UNESCO Intangible Cultural Heritage Lists.

In Uganda, the Barkcloth is made from the bark of the ficus natalensis tree. Barkcloth was the main cloth worn by people in Buganda, Bunyoro, etc until the introduction of cotton and silk cloth by Arab traders in the early 1840s around the time of Kabaka Ssuuna II.

=== Vietnam ===
The production of barkcloth may have originated in Southeastern China, in a region adjacent to Vietnam. South East China was the origins to the ancestors of many people, including those who migrated to Vietnam. Throughout ancient Vietnam, the bark-cloth was widely made; this practice of producing barkcloth has survived in modern times in a few rural areas in Vietnam.

== Modern cotton "barkcloth" ==
Today, what is commonly called barkcloth is a soft, thick, slightly textured fabric, so named because it has a rough surface like that of tree bark. This barkcloth is usually made of densely woven cotton fibers. Historically, the fabric has been used in home furnishings, such as curtains, drapery, upholstery, and slipcovers. It is often associated with 1940s through 1960s home fashions, particularly in tropical, abstract, "atomic" and "boomerang" prints, the last two themes being expressed by images of atoms with electrons whirling, and by the boomerang shape which was very popular in mid-century cocktail tables and fabrics and influenced by the Las Vegas "Atomic City" era. Waverly, a famed design house for textiles and wall coverings between 1923 and 2007, called their version of this fabric rhino cloth, possibly for the rough, nubbly surface. American barkcloth shot through with gold Lurex threads was called Las Vegas cloth, and contained as much as 65% rayon as well, making it a softer, more flowing fabric than the stiffer all-cotton rhino cloth or standard cotton barkcloth.

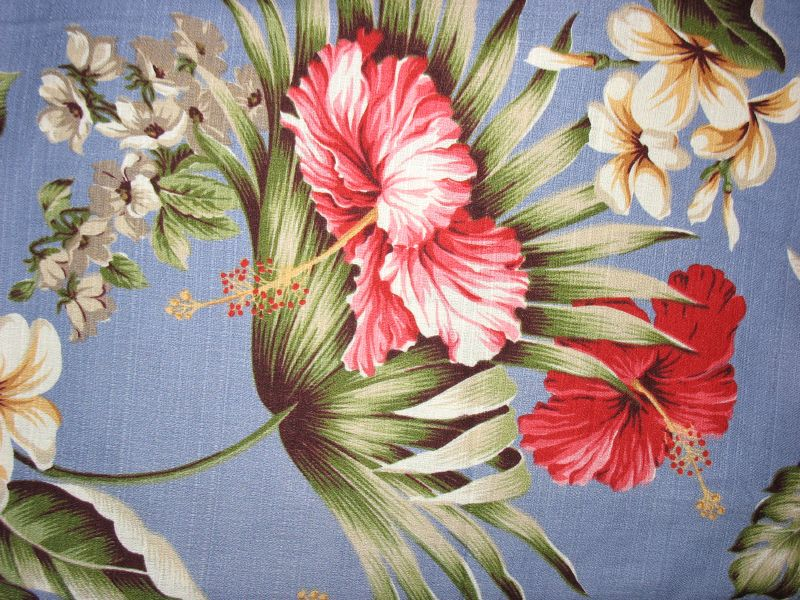
Barkcloth-style skirt weight cotton

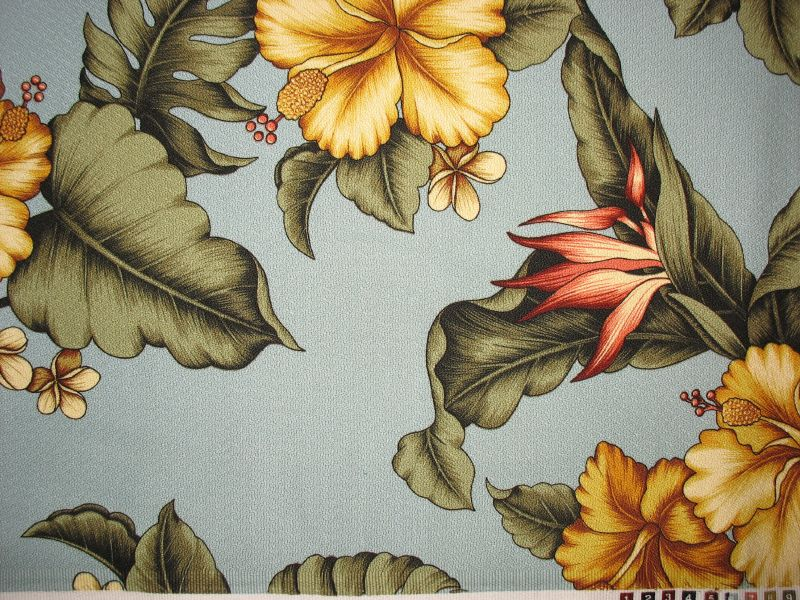
A hibiscus flower pattern on woven barkcloth

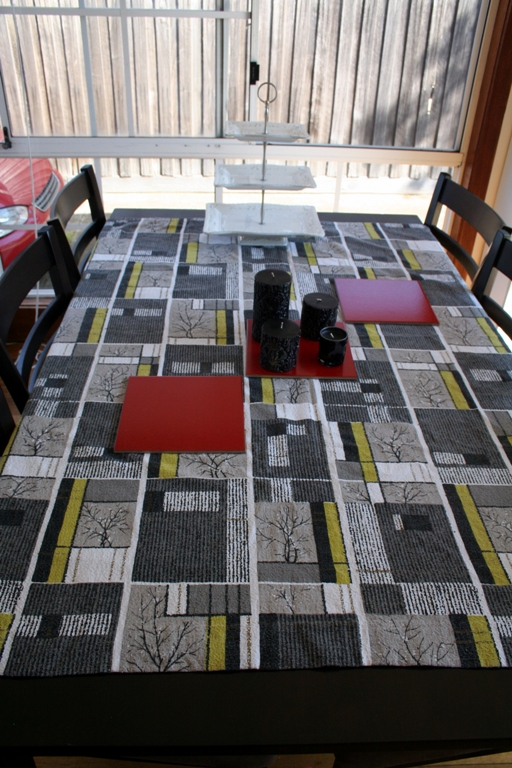
1950s woven barkcloth tablecloth with botanical design

== See also ==
- Bast fibre
- Bast shoe
- Cedar bark textile
- Lacebark
- Osnaburg
