= Cedar bark textile =

Material of the Indigenous peoples of the Pacific Northwest

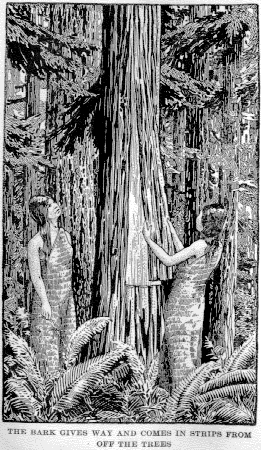

Cedar bark textile is a material used by Indigenous peoples of the Pacific Northwest in Southwestern Canada and Northwestern United States including Alaska. Historically, most items of clothing were made of shredded and woven cedar bark.

The names of the trees that provide the inner bark material are Thuja plicata, the Western redcedar, and Callitropsis nootkatensis, or yellow cypress (often called "yellow cedar"). Bark was peeled in long strips from the trees, the outer layer was split away, and the flexible inner layer was shredded and processed. The resulting felted strips of bark were soft and could be plaited, sewn, or woven into a variety of fabrics that were either dense and watertight, or soft and comfortable.

Women wore skirts and capes of red cedar bark, while men wore long capes of cedar bark into which some mountain goat wool was woven for decorative effect.

Cedar bark is used in Chilkat weaving and for weaving water-resistant hats.

== See also ==
- Barkcloth
- Northwest Coast art
- Textile arts of indigenous peoples of the Americas
