= Translucent paper =

Translucent paper may refer to:

== Papers ==
- Coated paper § Imitation parchment and vellum paper
- Glassine
- Onionskin
- Tracing paper

=== Rice paper ===
- Japanese tissue, known as rice paper
  - Washi paper, a Japanese crafting paper sometimes translated as rice paper, although it doesn't include rice
- Korean paper (hanji), a Korean crafting paper known as rice paper
- Lokta paper from Nepal, known incorrectly as rice paper
- Pith paper, known as rice paper
  - Rice-paper plant
- Xuan paper, a Chinese calligraphy paper known as rice paper
