= Sunqua =

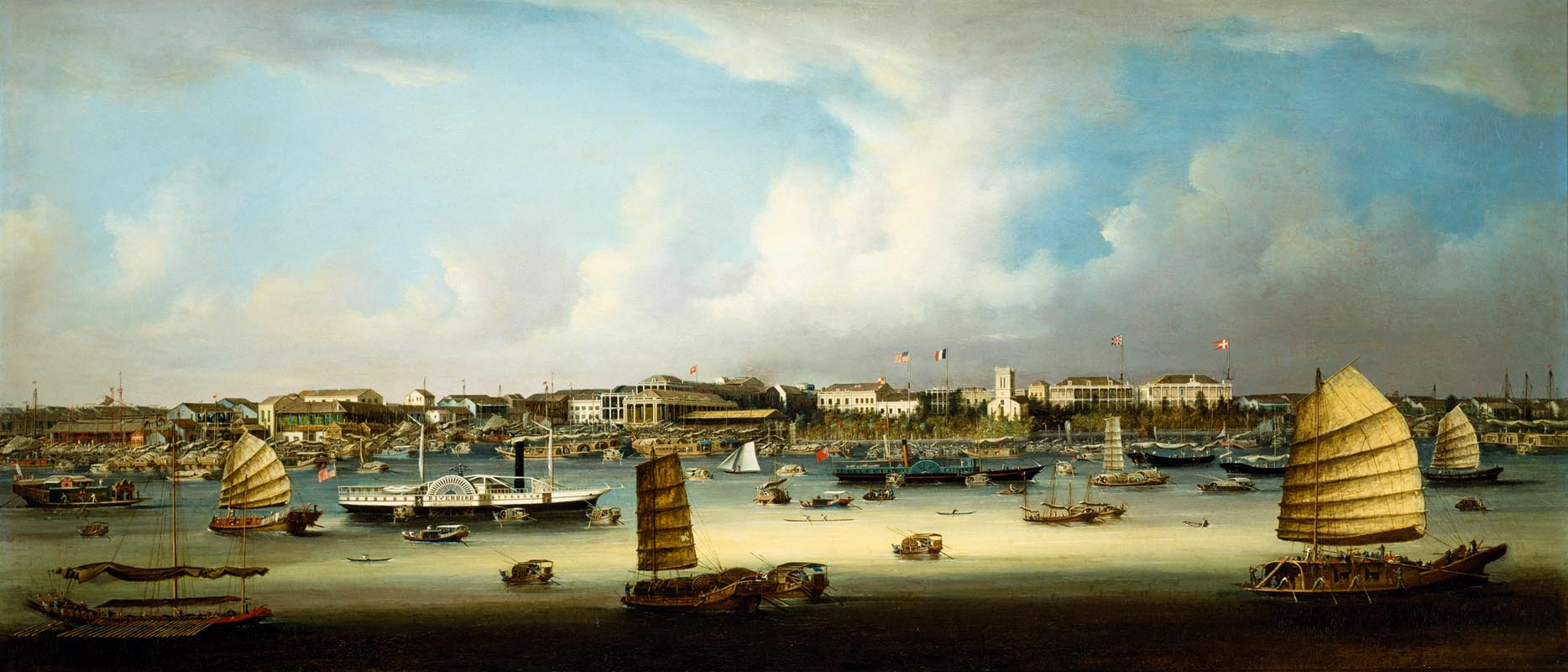
View of the Canton River, showing the Thirteen Factories in the background, by Sunqua, 1850–1855

Seal of Sunqua on an album of pith paintings

A painting on pith paper by Sunqua. Adilnor Collection, Sweden.

Sunqua (active 1830–1870) was a Chinese painter during the Qing dynasty. He was one of the best known of the Chinese artists in 19th century producing pictures for the European market. Residing in China Street in the city of Canton (Guangzhou), Sunqua worked and established studios in Canton and Macao, and was known for his large oil pictures of the shipping and trade into these ports. His studio also concentrated on flower and trade albums, most of which are in full bodycolour painted on pith paper.

In 1838, he was credited as the "Chinese Hogarth" for his series of six pictures to illustrate the effects of opium-smoking in the style of English painter William Hogarth's series A Rake's Progress. Painted on pith paper, the series portrays the progress of an opium smoker from health and prosperity to misery and degradation. The Chinese Repository described the work as "the most spirited and striking thing we have ever yet seen from the pencil of a Chinese" in 1837. He also drew a series illustrating a gambler's career.

== See also ==
- Lam Qua, Chinese painter from Canton, active in the same era
