= Rice paper =

Rice paper may refer to:

== Edible paper ==
- Bánh tráng or rice paper wrappers, a Vietnamese culinary paper
- Wafer paper, a thin edible starch sheet known as rice paper
  - Oblaat, a nearly transparent wafer paper often made from rice starch

== Materials ==
- Japanese tissue, commonly known as rice paper
  - Washi paper, a Japanese crafting paper commonly known as rice paper
- Korean paper (hanji), a Korean crafting paper commonly known as rice paper
- Lokta paper from Nepal, commonly known as rice paper
- Pith paper, commonly known as rice paper
  - Rice-paper plant
- Xuan paper, a Chinese calligraphy paper commonly known as rice paper

== Other uses ==
- Ricepaper, a Canadian literary magazine
- Idea idea, a butterfly commonly known as a "rice paper"

== See also ==
- Rizla brand rolling papers, made from rice
- White Rabbit (candy), a candy wrapped in edible rice starch paper
