= China Printing Museum =

Printing museum in Beijing, China

- 中国印刷博物馆
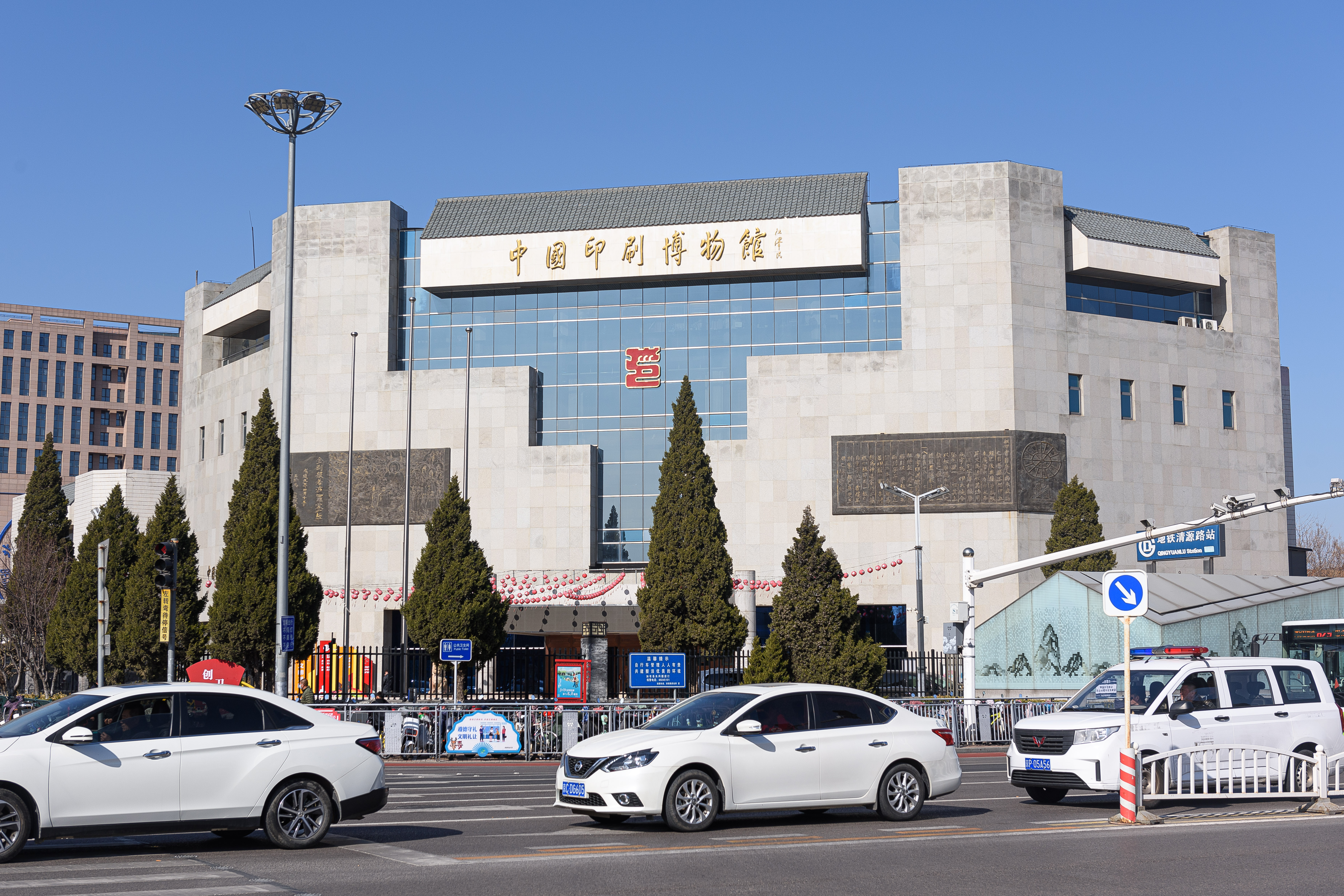
- Established: 1996
- Location: Qingyuan Subdistrict, Daxing District, Beijing, People's Republic of China
- Coordinates: 39.7407°N 116.3256°E
- Website: printingmuseum.cn

The China Printing Museum (Chinese: 中国印刷博物馆; pinyin: zhōngguó yìnshuā bówùguǎn) is a public museum dedicated to printing, located in Beijing, China. Established in 1996, the China Printing Plate Museum is the largest museum on printing in the world. The China Printing Museum displays the invention and evolution of Chinese printing. The museum has collected many collections of printing equipment, printed manuscripts, ceramics and other exhibits.

It is situated inside the Beijing Institute of Graphic Communication campus at Qingyuanlu Station of subway line 4, in Daxing District, Beijing.

== Gallery ==
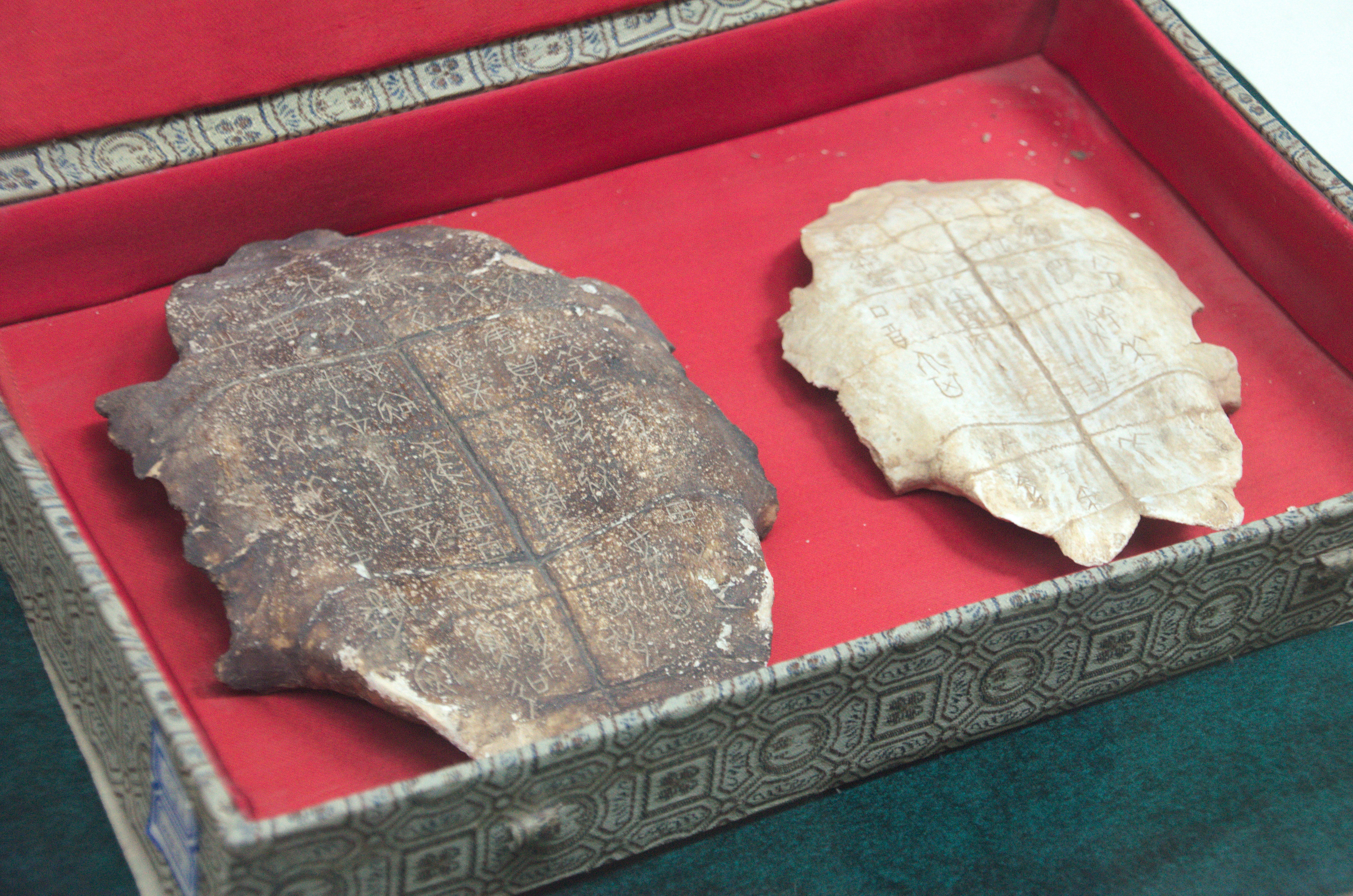
Oracle bone script, Shang dynasty (16th — 11th century B.C.) unearthed at the capital of Yin (modern Anyang, Henan Province).

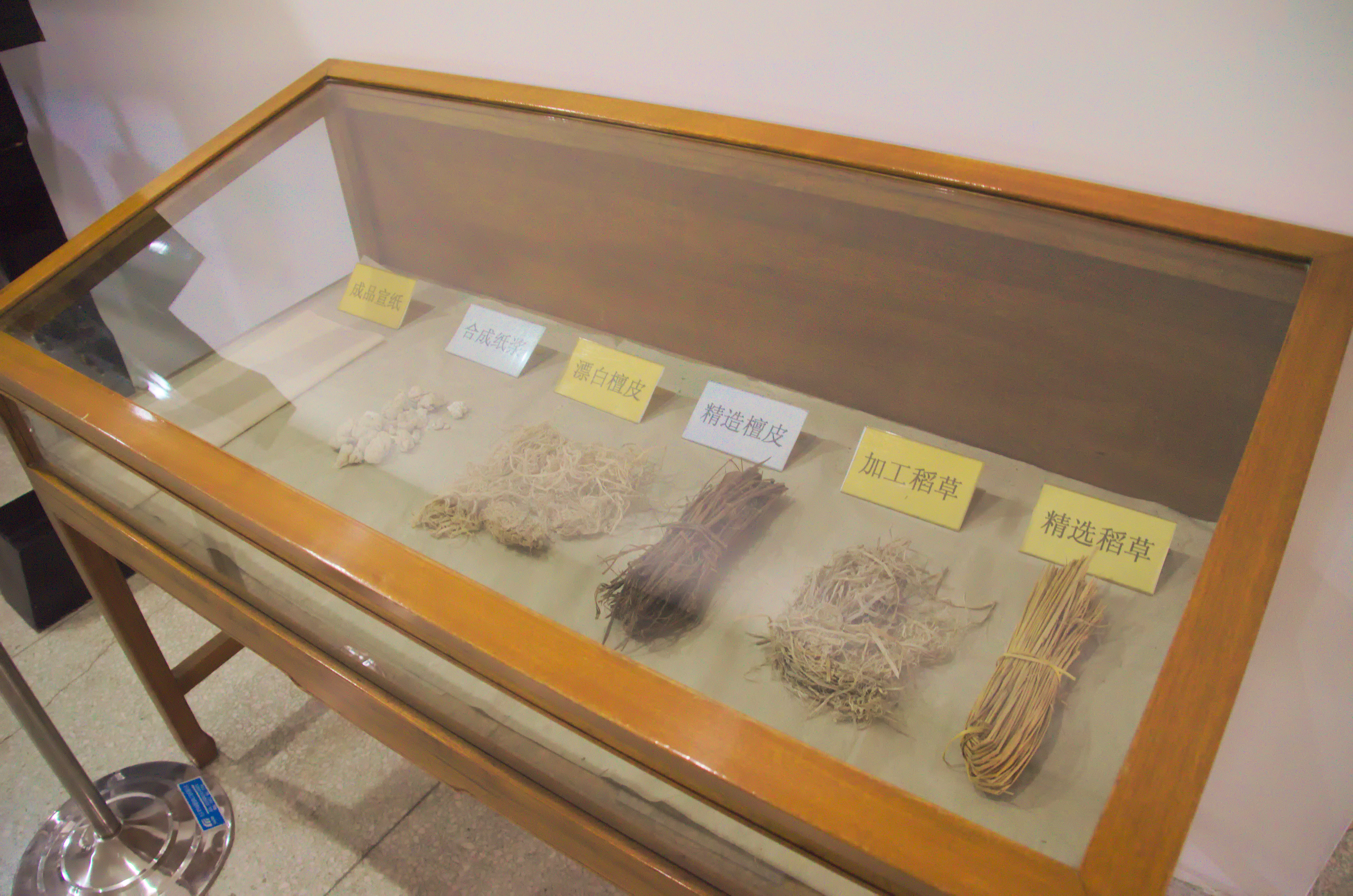
Steps to make rice paper, from rice straw to paper sheet.

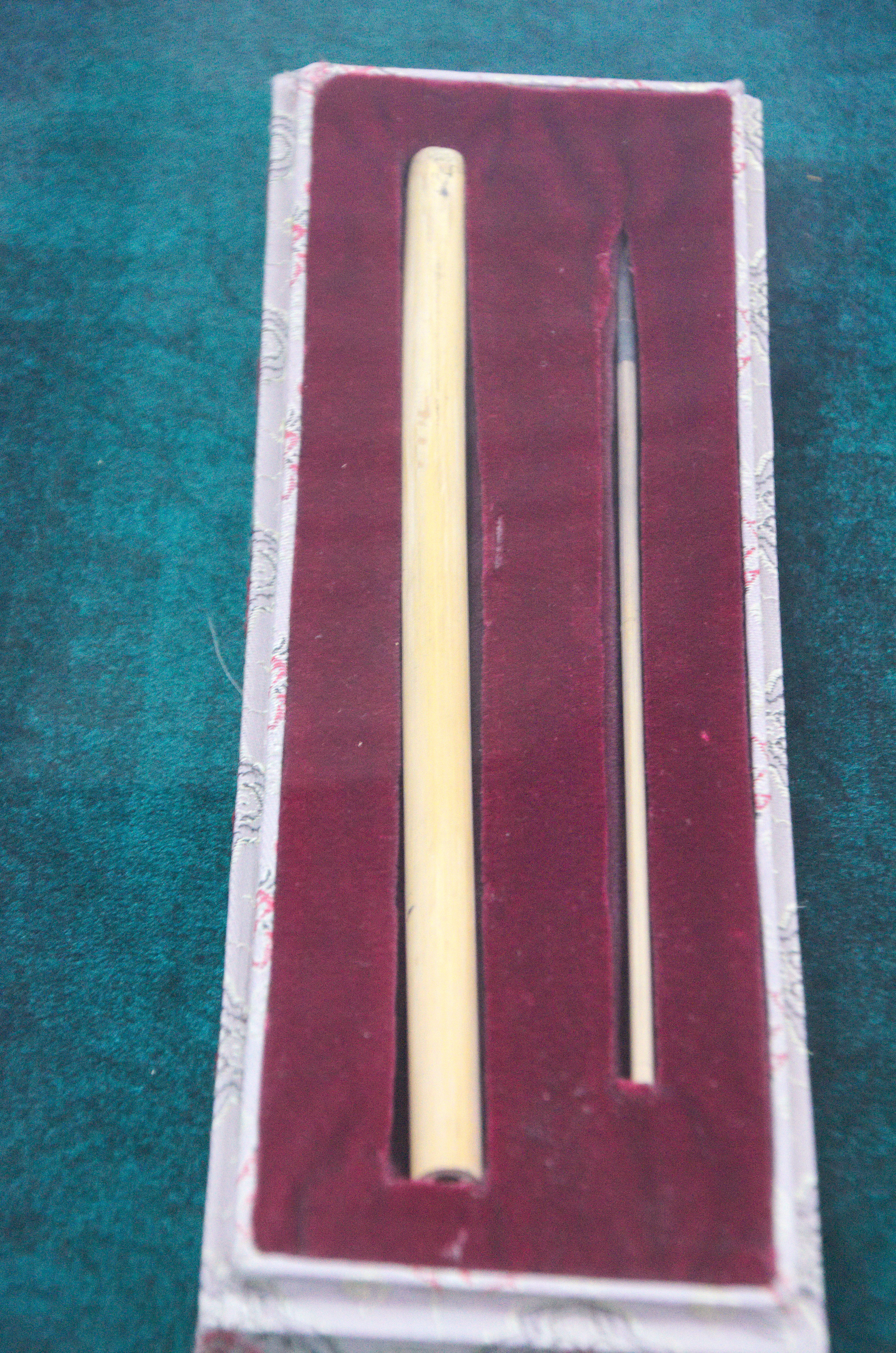
Pencil brush from the Warring States period.

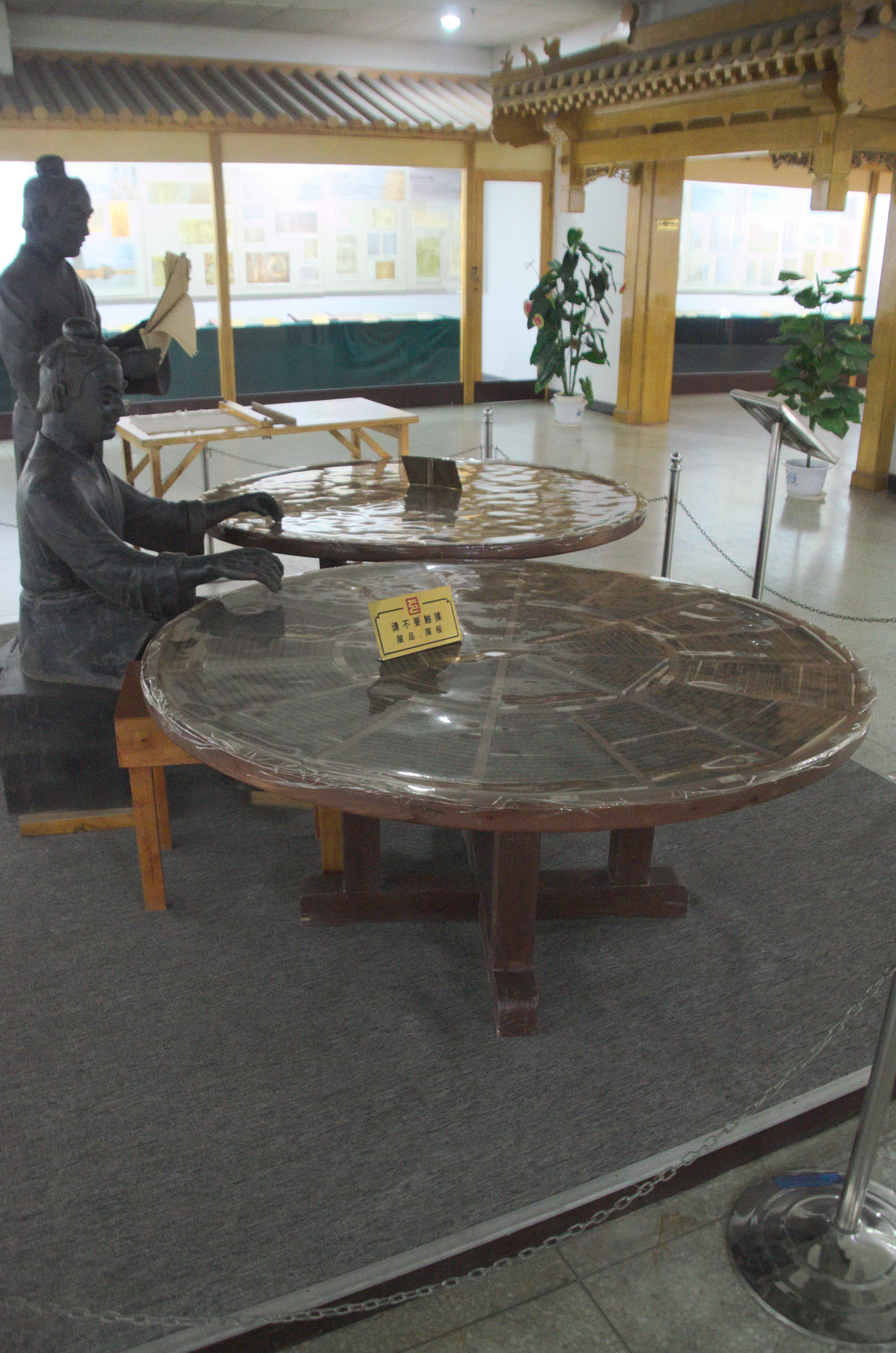
Rebuild of Bi Sheng (simplified Chinese: 毕升; traditional Chinese: 畢昇, 11th century) creation of mobile characters printing tools

== See also ==
- China Block Printing Museum in Yangzhou
