= Watercolor paper =

Paper created for watercolour painting

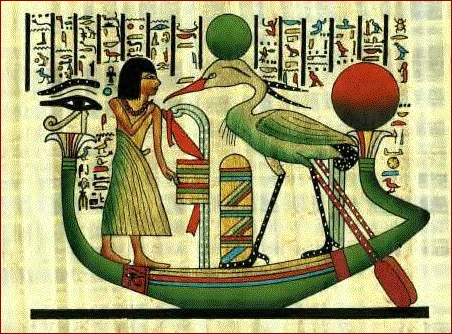
Painting on papyrus

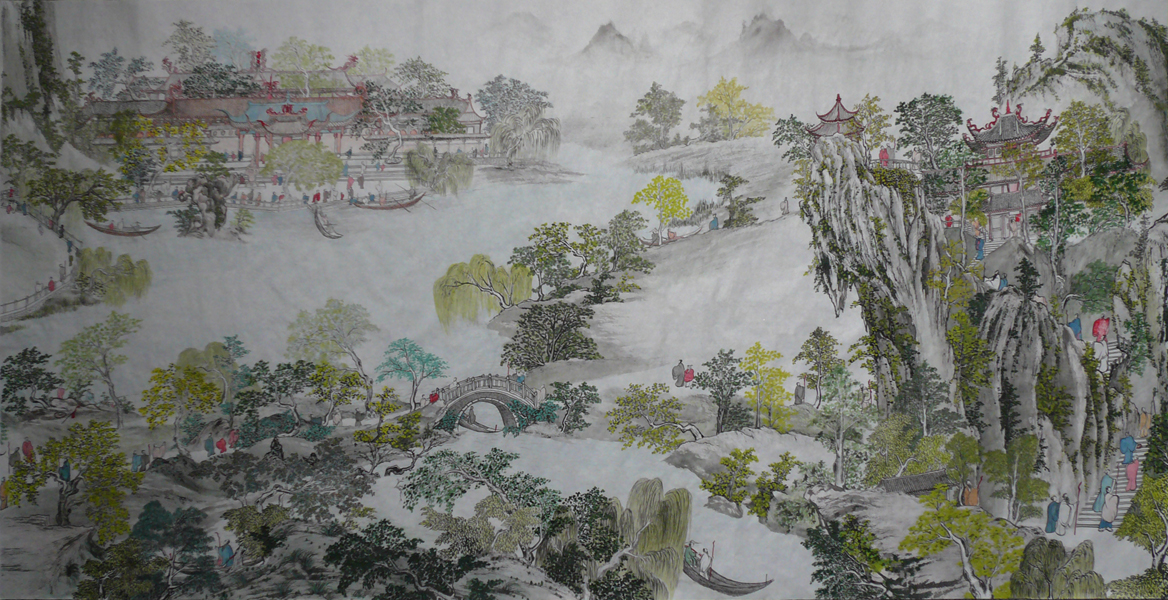
Pith paper is used as the substrate for this contemporary, traditionally-styled landscape painting.

Watercolor paper (or watercolour paper) is paper or substrate onto which an artist applies watercolor paints, pigments, or dyes. Many types of paper are manufactured specifically for watercolour painting. The paper may be made of wood pulp exclusively, or mixed with cotton fibers. Pure cotton watercolor paper is also used but it is more expensive than pulp-based paper. Some watercolourists prefer an acid-free medium.

Watercolor paper may be hot-pressed (smooth), cold-pressed (textured), or rough. Paper traditionally comes in either 90, 140, or 300 lb weights. Prices range from affordable to more expensive and higher quality.

== History ==
Papyrus was used as a 'paper' onto which the Egyptians applied their water-based paints or pigments. Modern Watercolor brands and countries of manufacture: Winsor & Newton, Saunders Waterford, Hayle Mill, Whatman and Bockingford Watercolor Paper made in Britain; Bee Paper Company and St. Armand Watercolor Paper, Canada; Velke Losiny Moldau watercolor paper, Czech Republic; Canson, Strathmore, Kilimanjaro, Moulin de Larroque, Lanaquarelle and Arches paper made in France; Zerkall, Hahnemuhle Watercolor Paper made in Germany; Khadi Watercolor Paper handmade in India; Fabriano Watercolor Paper Made in Italy; Legion Yupo, Legion Stonehenge, Jack Richeson, Twin Rocker, Fluid and Sax Watercolor Paper Made in the US.

Details of brands and their manufacture: Saunders Waterford and Bockingford are made by St. Cuthberts Mill. Kilimanjaro is distributed exclusively in the US by Cheap Joe's and is likely to be of French origin. Khadi and Twin Rocker are exclusively handmade. Hayle Mill and Zerkall are recently defunct. Hayle Mill was the official paper of the Royal Watercolour Society. The Zerkall Mill was destroyed by a flood in Germany in 2021 and because of market forces, will not reopen. Legion imprints Yupo and Stonehenge. Strathmore 300 and 400 are packaged and Branded in the US but are a product of France; the French mill is unknown. The Czech town and Mill of Velke Losiny make Moldau watercolor paper, much of which is handmade. Fluid and Fluid 100 are a product line produced by a subsidiary of Speedball, USA. St. Armand produces handmade Dominion watercolor paper in all the usual modern textures and in 150, 200 and 300 lb weights. Most watercolor paper manufacturers produce several qualities of paper for Student and Professional use; these manufacturers include St.Cuthbert Mill, Canson, Strathmore, Hahnemuhle, Fabriano and Speedball/Fluid.

Fabriano began production of paper in 1264. It was used by Michelangelo during the Renaissance. Today, after 750 years of production, it is used in the Euro currency. Fabriano watercolor paper is used by Artists world wide.

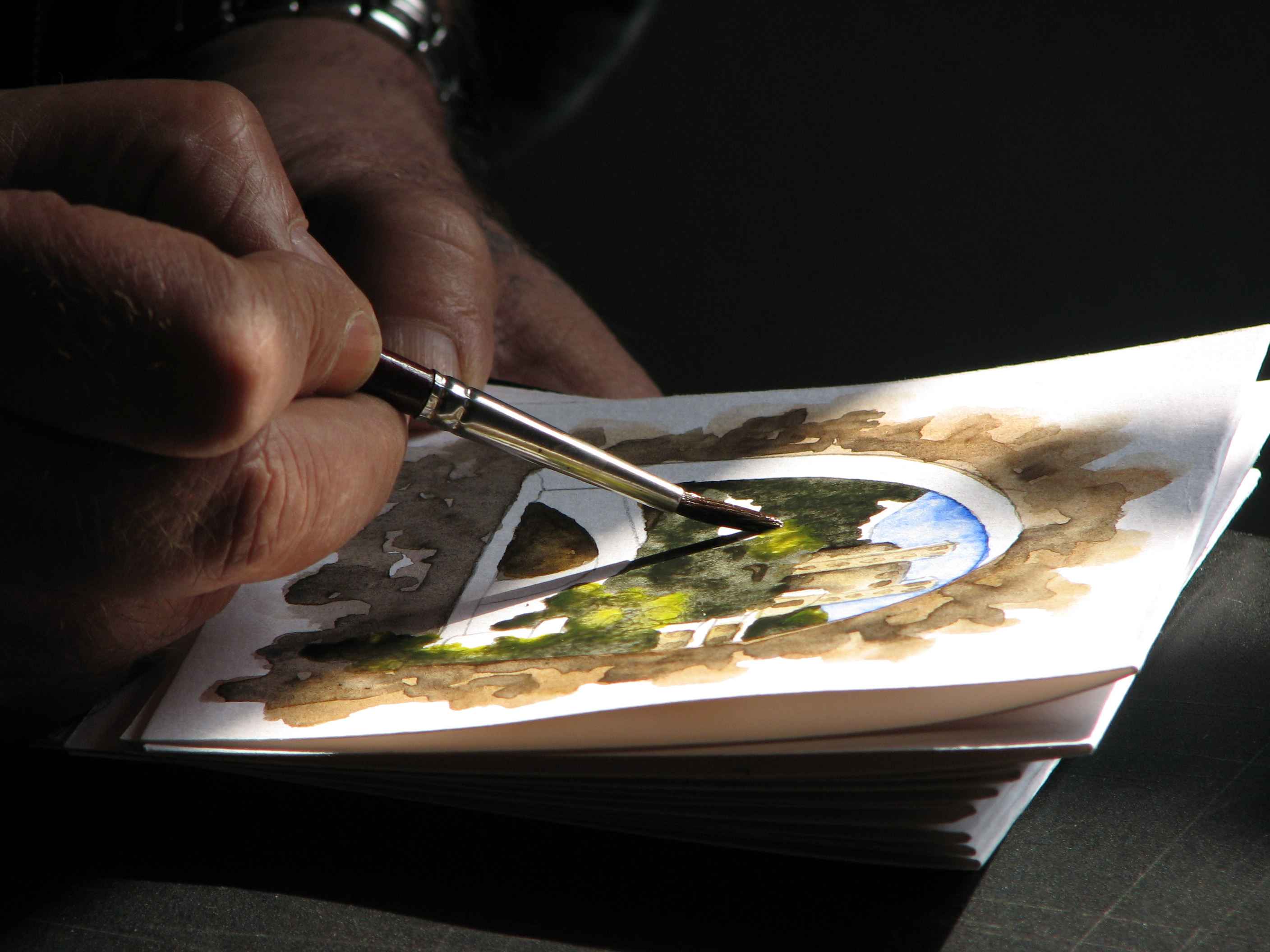
An artist painting on thick watercolor paper

Arches began production of watercolor paper around 1620. It provided most of the paper used in France during the 1700s. In addition to watercolor paper, Arches also produced paper that was used in documents and paper that was used as currency during the revolution in France. Arches joined other paper manufacturers in the 1950s to form Arjomari Prioux (which later merged with Arjowiggins).

Woven paper was used in print publication in the late 1760s because it was found to be smoother. The watercolor paper at this time was used by artists because it allowed the application of paint without the unevenness of molded paper. James Whatman created a paper specifically for use with water colors by the 1780s. He used gelatin as a sizing that created a protective coating that reduced damage to the paper by repeated wetting, drying and reworking.

== See also ==
- Acrylic paint
- Acrylic painting techniques
- Gouache
- History of painting
- Oil paint
- Paper
- Category:Watercolorists
