= Pith paper =

Paper made from the pith of shrubs

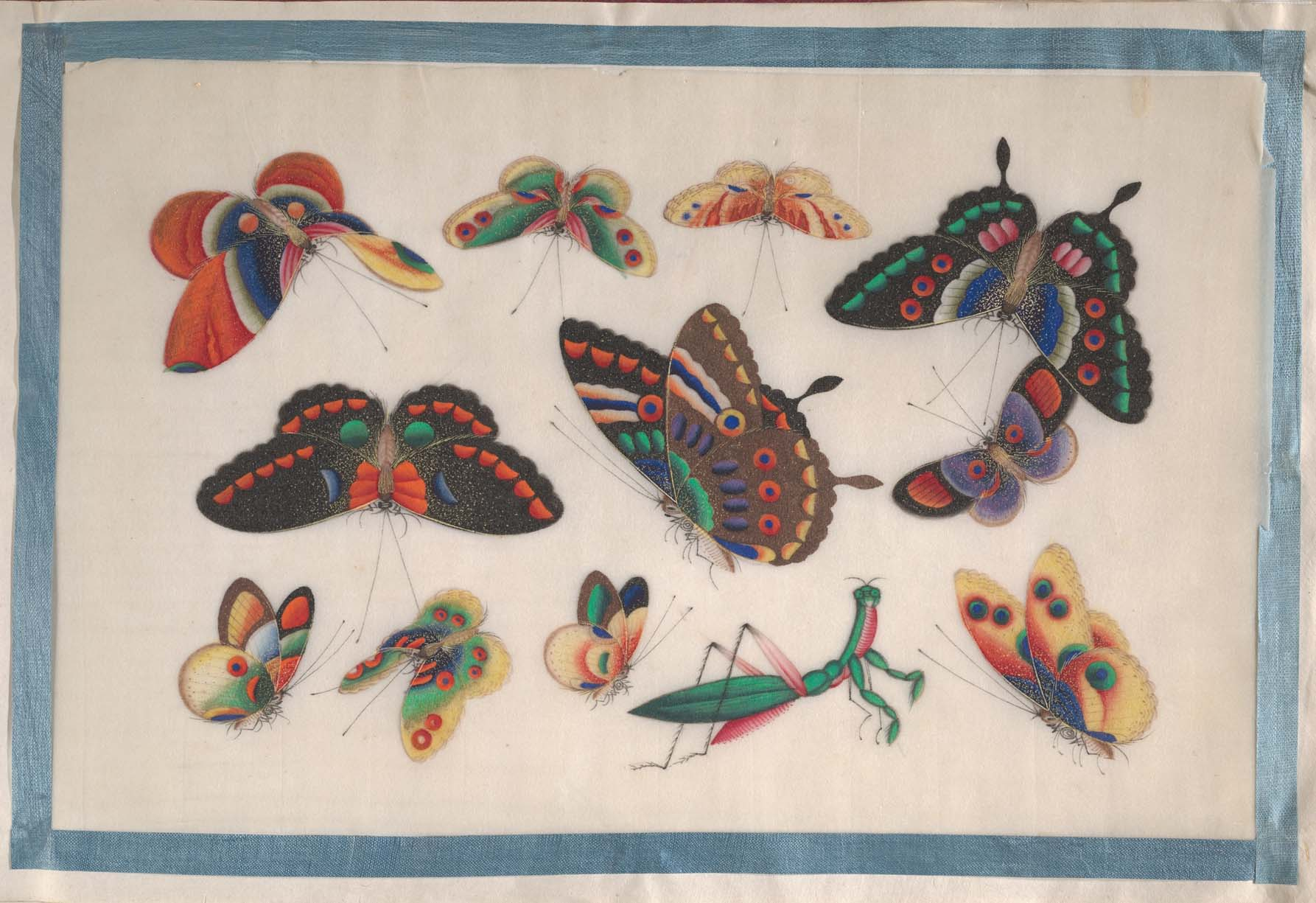
Pith paper painting, 19th century

Pith paper is a Chinese paper analogue and paper craft material^{[a]} made from the pith of Tetrapanax papyrifer, a monotypic genus of East Asian shrubs. The paper is translucent, naturally white, velvety and very delicate; European traders referred to it by the misnomer rice paper, assuming it to be made of rice.

== History ==
Pith paper was being produced as early as the Jin dynasty, when Emperor Hui of Jin ordered multi-colored pith paper flowers during the Yuankang era, 299-300CE. Pith paper flowers featured on Chinese hairpins, and were worn by both men and women. By the Ming dynasty, pith paper flowers began to be produced in larger amounts, primarily in Jiangsu, and flower hairpins became a special occasion woman's accessory.

In the first half of the 19th century, pith paper became a preferred painting support for watercolor, gouache, tempera and ink wash paintings for sale in the Canton System. Besides the inherent value of the painting, the unique qualities of the pith paper and light cargo weight made the pith paper paintings popular among European merchants and tourists. Paintings were often pasted into albums with silk ribbon frames.

Pith paper remains an export good from Taiwan and southern China, with South America being the largest export market.

=== Rice paper misnomer ===
Pith paper became known by the misnomer 'rice paper' in the West - and Tetrapanax the 'rice-paper plant' - in the 19th century as pith paper paintings arrived in Europe. British botanist William Jackson Hooker is credited with identifying to the Western world that pith paper is made from Tetrapanax pith in 1852.

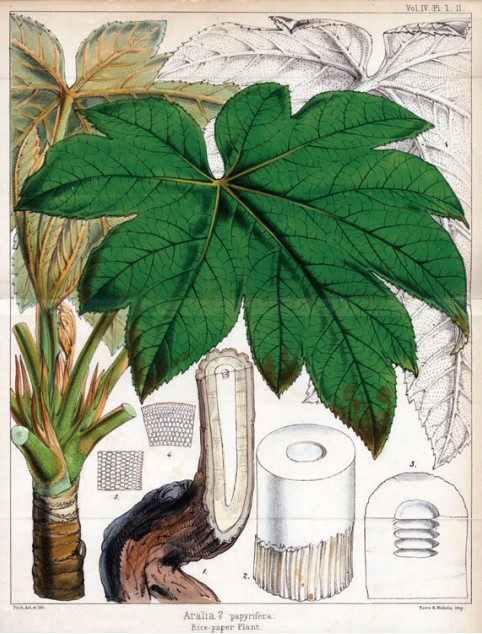
Cutaway diagram of Tetrapanax showing the pith

== Production and uses ==
Traditional production of pith paper begins by soaking branches of Tetrapanax for days to release the pith from the bark. Modern pith paper production eschews soaking for hammering the pith out of logs. The pith is then peeled lengthwise with a blade into sheets, which can be molded further with moisture before final drying.

Pith paper is brittle and hygroscopic, making retouching and conservation difficult. However, this trait can be taken advantage of as a watercolor paper, where painted sections of the paper will essentially emboss themselves. Pith paper also readily accepts dyes, applied in paper crafting.

== Notes ==
1. ^[a] Being essentially a slice of pith, not milled fibers, pith paper may not be considered a "true" paper.

== See also ==
- Onionskin paper
- Sunqua, 19th century Qing painter
- Artificial plants
- History of paper
