= Poster paint =

Cheap distemper paint

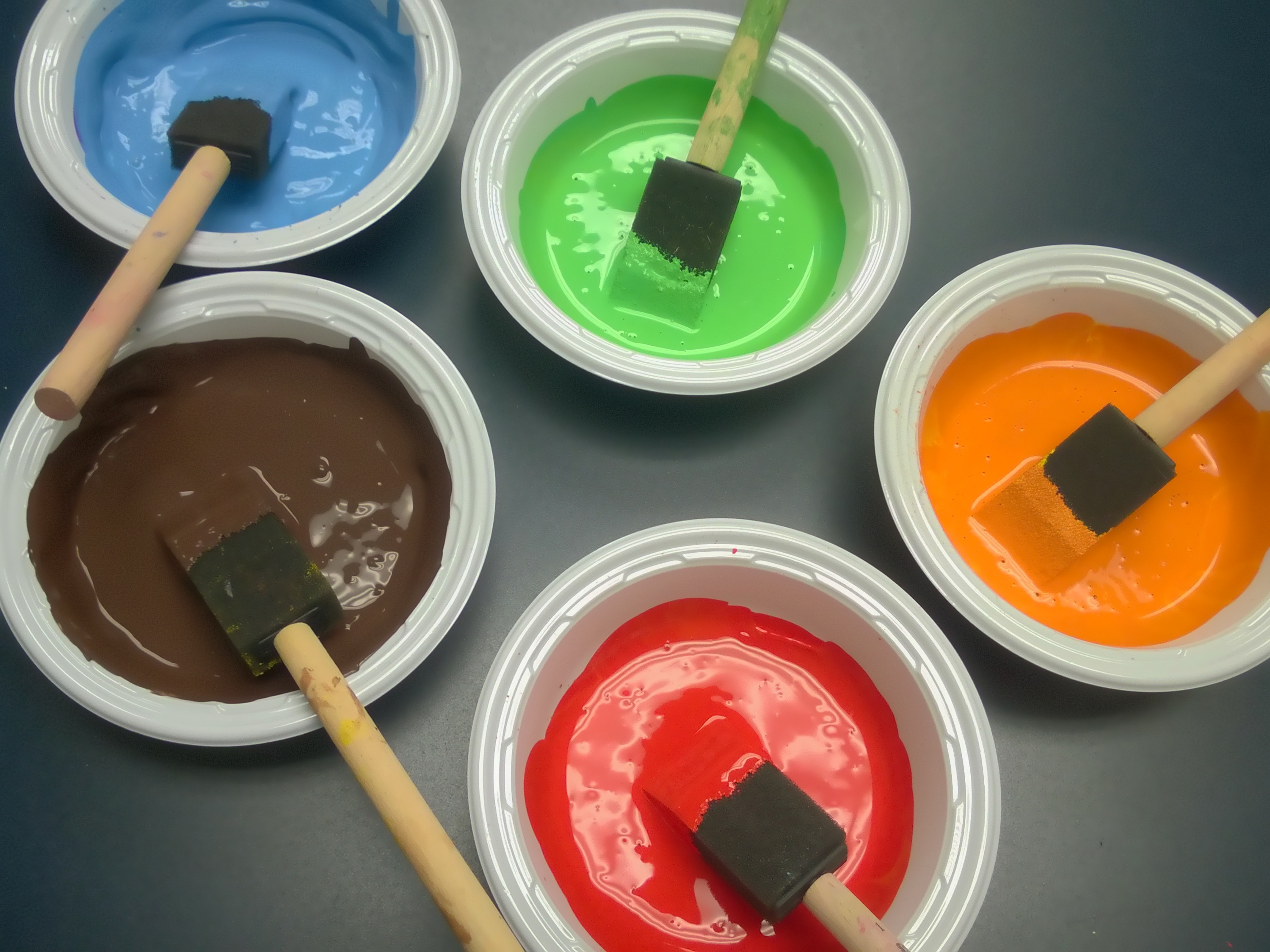
Several colors of poster paint

Poster paint (also known as tempera paint in the US, poster color in Asia) is a distemper paint that usually uses starch, cornstarch, cellulose, gum-water or another glue size as its binder. It either comes in large bottles or jars or in a powdered form. It is normally a cheap paint used in school art classes.

Asian poster paints are similar to gouache, albeit has a thinner viscosity, uses gum arabic and/or dextrin as a binder, and use inexpensive and less lightfast pigments more coarsely ground, with added brighteners to make the paints affordable. Poster colours are used in art classes, in animation production, and in scanning and printing. Notable brands that produce poster colors include Kokuyo Camlin, Monami, Pentel, Sakura, and Nicker.

== See also ==
- Gouache
- Tempera, the common name for Poster paint in the US and also a fine art painting material using egg yolk as a binder
