= Xuan paper =

Paper used in Chinese calligraphy

Traditional handicrafts of making Xuan paper
- UNESCO Intangible Cultural Heritage
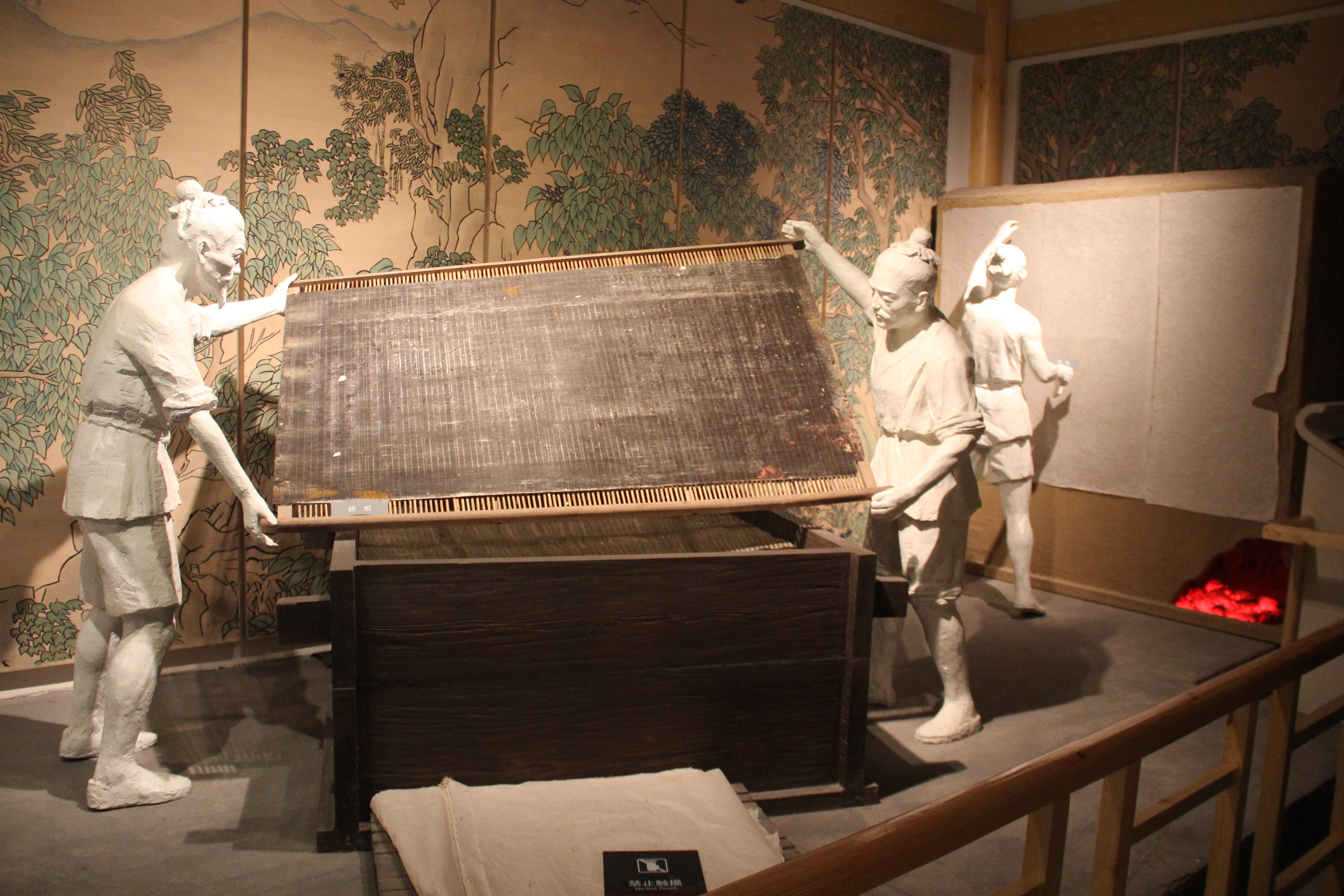
- Country: China
- Reference: 201
- Region: Asia and the Pacific

Inscription history
- Inscription: 2009 (4th session)
- List: Representative
- UNESCO Cultural Heritage

Xuan paper
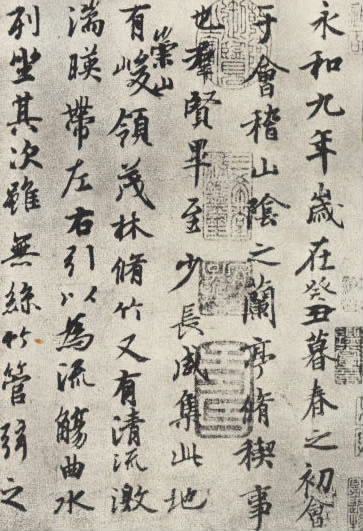
- Wang Xizhi's Lantingji Xu on Xuan paper.

Chinese name
- Traditional Chinese: 宣紙
- Simplified Chinese: 宣纸
- Literal meaning: "Paper of Xuan(cheng)"
Transcriptions
Standard Mandarin
- Hanyu Pinyin: xuānzhǐ
- IPA: [ɕɥɛ́n.ʈʂɻ̩̀]
Wu
- Romanization: 1xi-tsr
Gan
- Romanization: 'xyon1 zi3
Yue: Cantonese
- Jyutping: syun1 zi2
- IPA: [syn˥.tsi˧˥]
Southern Min
- Hokkien POJ: soan-chóa
- Tâi-lô: suan-tsuá

Vietnamese name
- Vietnamese alphabet: giấy Tuyên giấy Xuyến chỉ
- Hán-Nôm: 絏宣 絏宣紙

Korean name
- Hangul: 선지
- Hanja: 宣紙
Transcriptions
- Revised Romanization: seonji

Japanese name
- Kanji: 宣紙
- Kana: せんし
Transcriptions
- Romanization: senshi

Xuan paper, Shuen paper, or rice paper, is a kind of paper originating in ancient China used for writing and painting. Xuan paper is renowned for being soft and fine-textured, suitable for conveying the artistic expression of both Chinese calligraphy and painting.

== Origin ==
Xuan paper was first mentioned in ancient Chinese books Notes of Past Famous Paintings and New Book of Tang. It was originally produced in the Tang dynasty in Jing County, which was under the jurisdiction of Xuan Prefecture (Xuanzhou), hence the name Xuan paper. During the Tang dynasty, the paper was often a mixture of hemp (the first fibre used for paper in China) and mulberry fibre. By the Song dynasty, the paper producing industries in Huizhou and Chizhou were gradually transferred to Jing County.

== Classification ==
Due to different producing methods, Xuan paper can be classified into Shengxuan, Shuxuan, and Banshuxuan. Shengxuan (literally "Raw Xuan"), which is not specially processed, excels in its ability to absorb water, causing the ink on it to blur. Shuxuan (literally "Ripe Xuan"), however, has a sizing based on potassium alum applied to the paper during production, which results in a stiffer texture, a reduced ability to absorb water, and less resistance to shear stress (meaning that it can be torn much more easily). This feature makes Shuxuan more suitable for Gongbi rather than Xieyi. Banshuxuan (literally "Half-ripe Xuan") has intermediate absorbability, between Shengxuan and Shuxuan.

== Features ==
Xuan paper features great tensile strength, smooth surface, pure and clean texture and clean stroke, great resistance to crease, corrosion, moth and mould. The majority of ancient Chinese books and paintings by famous painters that survived until today are well preserved on Xuan paper. Xuan paper won the Golden Award at the Panama International Exposition in 1915. Xuan paper was used to make scrolls.

== Material and production ==
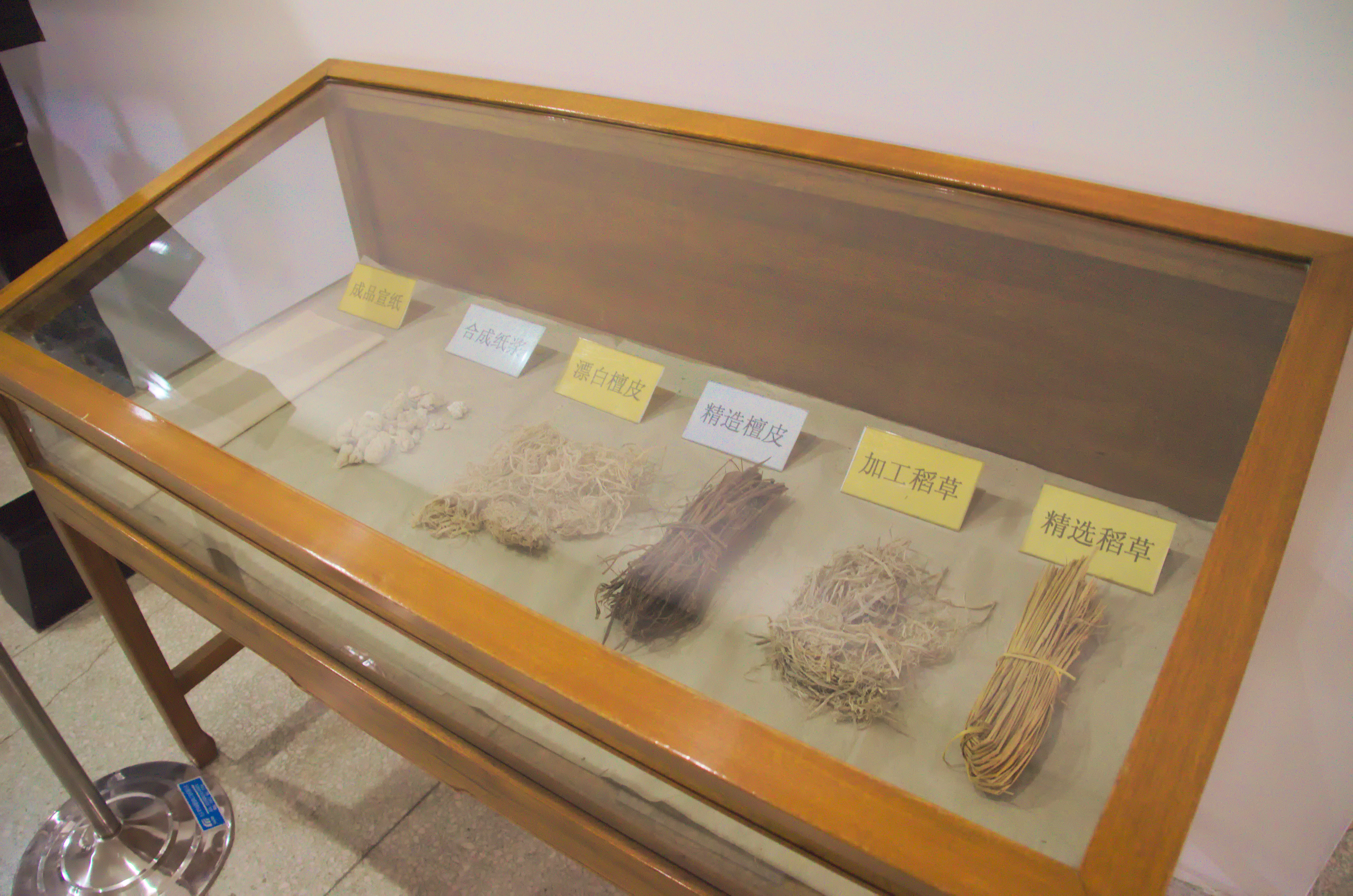
Production steps of Xuan paper, from the China Printing Museum in Beijing.

The material Xuan paper uses is closely related to the geography of Jing County. The bark of Pteroceltis tatarinowii, a common species in the area, was used as the main material to produce Xuan paper. Rice along with several other materials were subsequently added to the recipe, during the Song and Yuan dynasties. Bamboo and mulberry also began to be used to produce xuan paper around that time.

The production of Xuan paper can be loosely described as an 18-step process, but a detailed account would involve over a hundred steps. Some paper makers have invented steps which have been kept secret from others. The process includes steaming and bleaching the bark of Pteroceltis tatarinowii as well as the addition of a variety of juices.

== See also ==
- Rice paper
- Dó paper
- Samarkand paper
