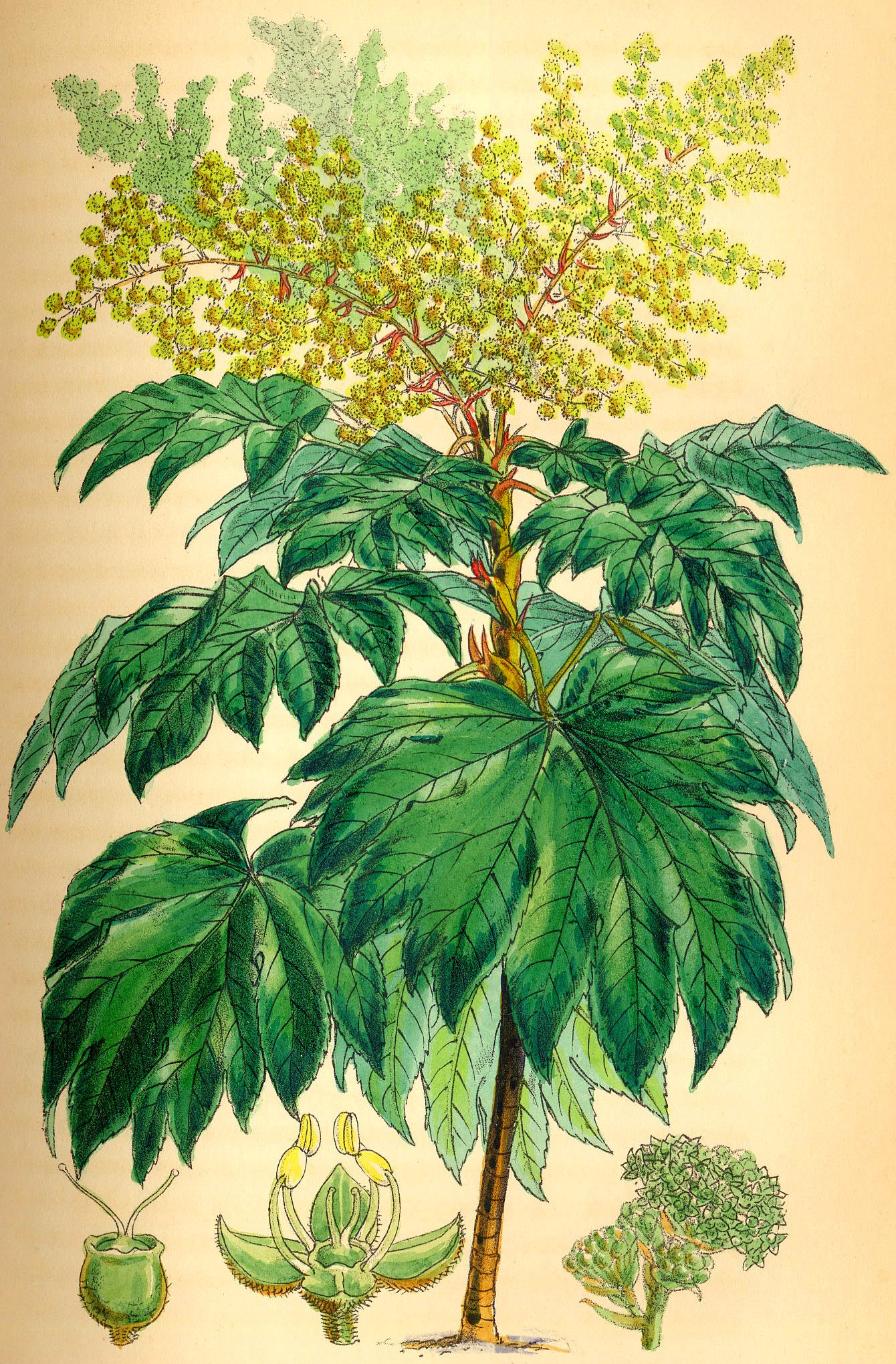

Conservation status
- Least Concern (IUCN 3.1)

Scientific classification
- Kingdom: Plantae
- Clade: Tracheophytes
- Clade: Angiosperms
- Clade: Eudicots
- Clade: Asterids
- Order: Apiales
- Family: Araliaceae
- Subfamily: Aralioideae
- Genus: Tetrapanax (K.Koch) K.Koch
- Species: T. papyrifer

Binomial name
- Tetrapanax papyrifer (Hook.) K.Koch

= Tetrapanax =

Monotypic genus of Asian shrub

Tetrapanax papyrifer, the rice paper plant (通草—tong cao), is an evergreen shrub or small tree in the family Araliaceae, the sole species in the genus Tetrapanax. The specific epithet is frequently misspelled as "papyriferum", "papyriferus", or "papyrifera". It is native to eastern and central China and Taiwan, but widely cultivated in East Asia and in other tropical to mild temperate regions as well.

The species was first described in the genus Aralia as Aralia papyrifera, and has also been treated in Fatsia as Fatsia papyrifera.

A second species, Tetrapanax tibetanus, is now regarded as a synonym of Merrilliopanax alpinus.

== Description ==
Tetrapanax grows between 3–7 metres tall, with usually unbranched stems 2–9 cm in diameter, and bearing a rosette of large leaves atop the crown; the top of the plant can visually, albeit superficially, appear similar to a number of plants belonging to Arecaceae (the palm family). The leaves are carried on 40–60 cm petioles; the orbicular leaf blade measures from 50 to 75 cm across (to a metre across in some cultivars), with anywhere from 5-12 deeply incised palmate lobes, the central lobes being larger and Y-forked near the end. It spreads extensively, by sprouts and runners from the root system, underground. The inflorescence is a large panicle of hemispherical or globular umbels, at the end of the stem. The flowers have 4-6 small, white petals. The fruit is a small berry 4 mm in diameter.

== Uses ==
=== Paper ===
The pith of Tetrapanax papyrifer is traditionally used to make paper. First, the boughs are boiled and freed from bark. The cylindrical core of pith is rolled on a hard flat surface against a knife, by which it is cut into thin sheets of a fine ivory-like texture.

The paper was used extensively in late 19th century Guangdong as a common support medium for gouache paintings sold to Western clients. The paper was colloquially thought by Europeans to be 'rice paper'. The term was first defined in the Chinese–English Dictionary of Robert Morrison who referred to the use of the Chinese medicinal plant as material for painting, as well as for making artificial flowers and shoe soles.

Dyed in various colours, this rice paper is extensively used for the preparation of artificial flowers, while the white sheets are employed for watercolor drawings. Due to its texture, this paper is not suited for writing.

=== Other uses ===
Tetrapanax papyrifer is used in traditional Chinese medicine.

The species is cultivated as an ornamental specimen plant, and has received the Royal Horticultural Society's Award of Garden Merit.

== Cultivars ==
The cultivar 'Rex' is a semi-evergreen shrub or tree with huge palmate leaves up to a metre diameter. Classified by the Royal Horticultural Society as H4, it is evergreen in mild locations, deciduous where temperatures fall below freezing, and herbaceous with more prolonged freezing. It prefers a sheltered position in full sun or partial shade.

== Gallery ==
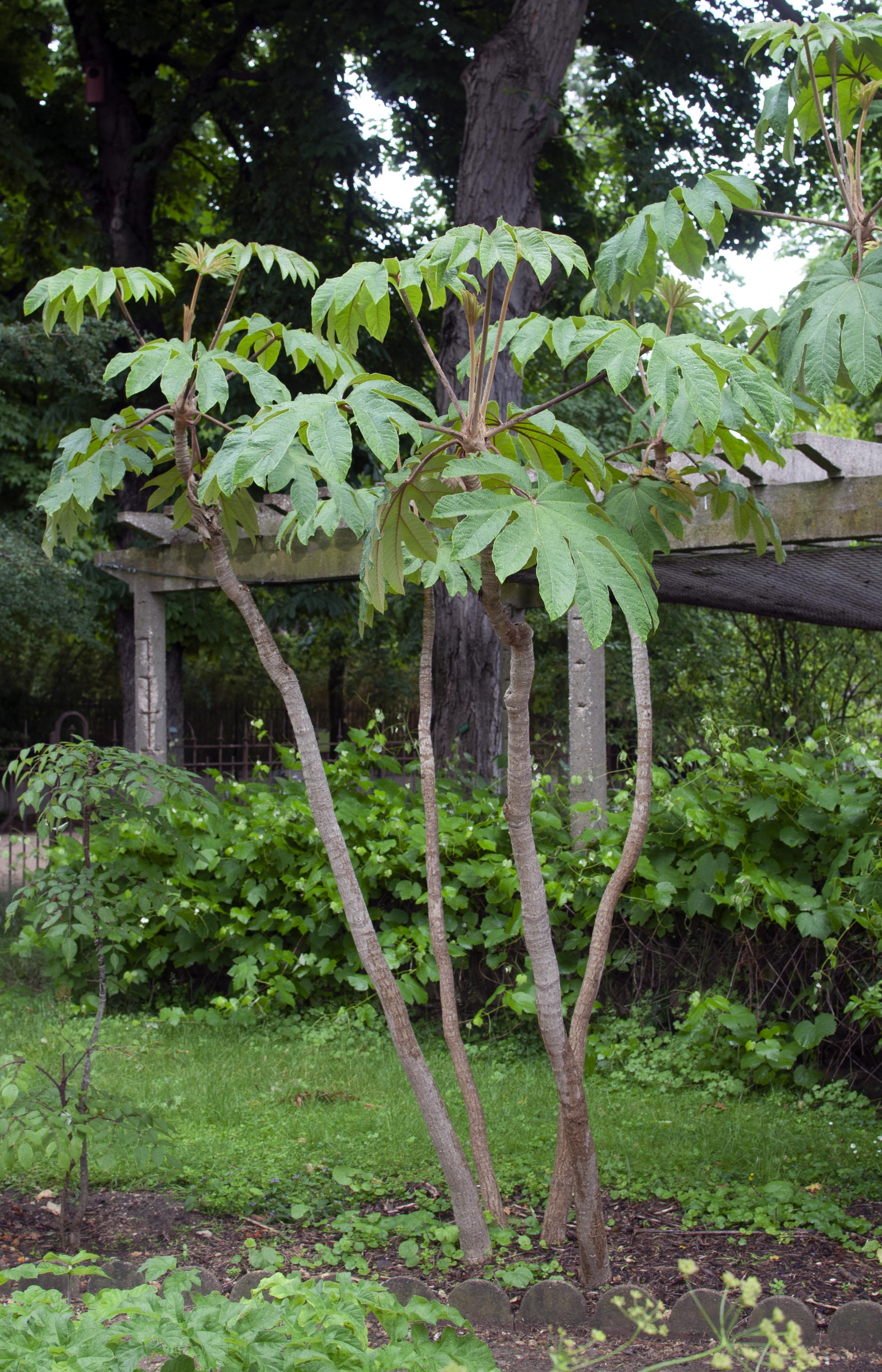
At the Jardin des plantes de Paris, France

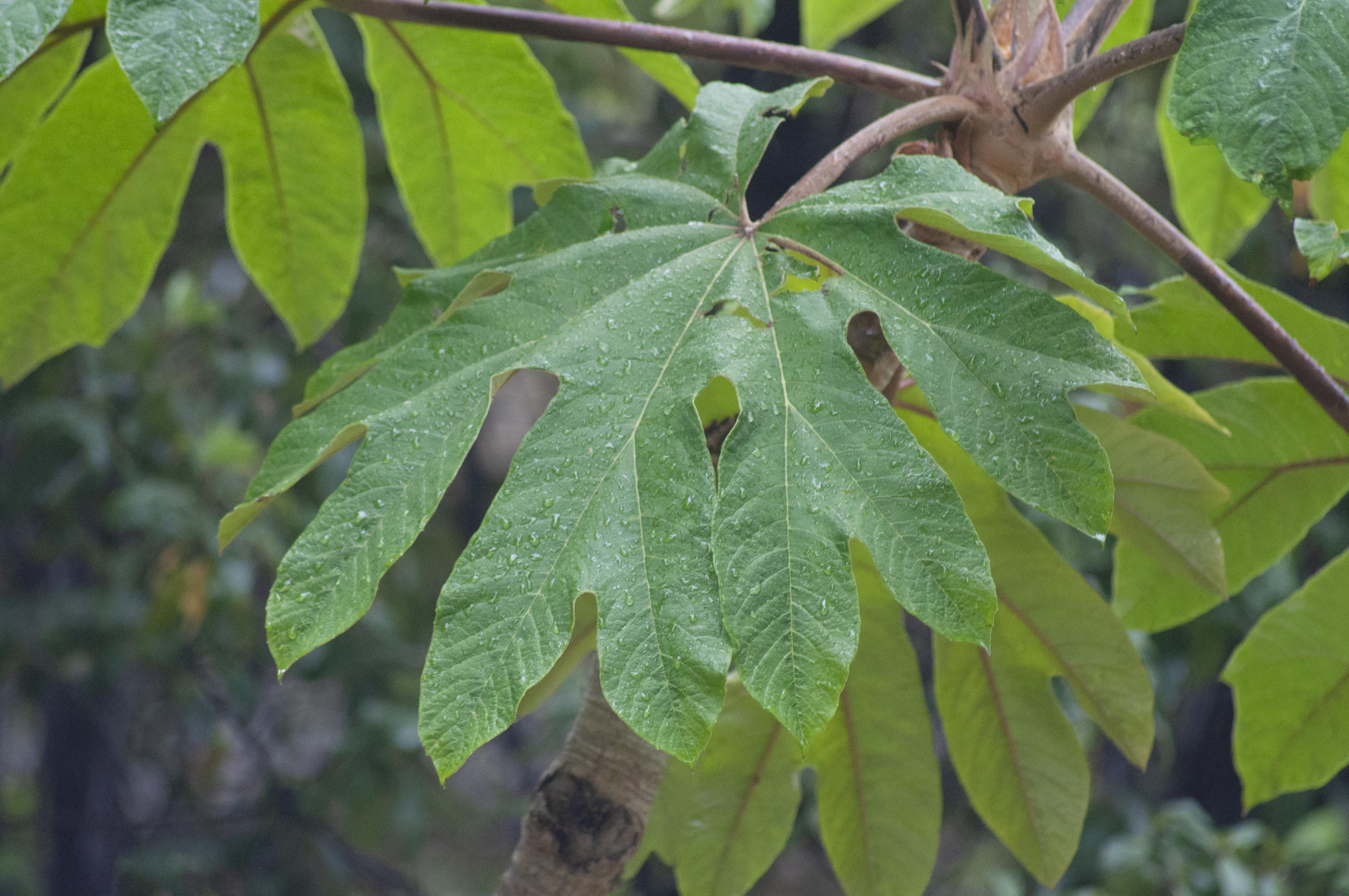
Leaf

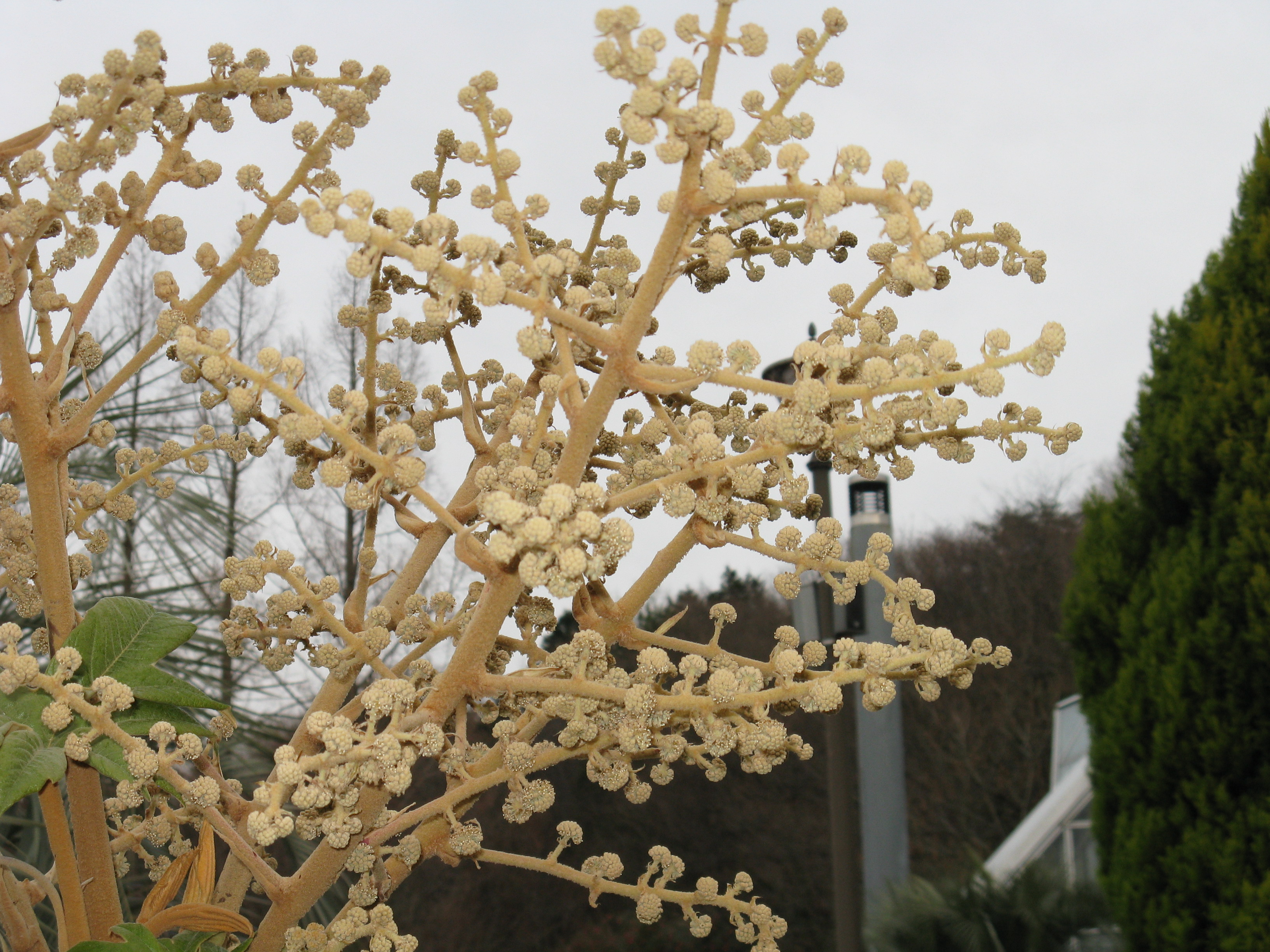
Inflorescence
