= Gouache =

Type of paint

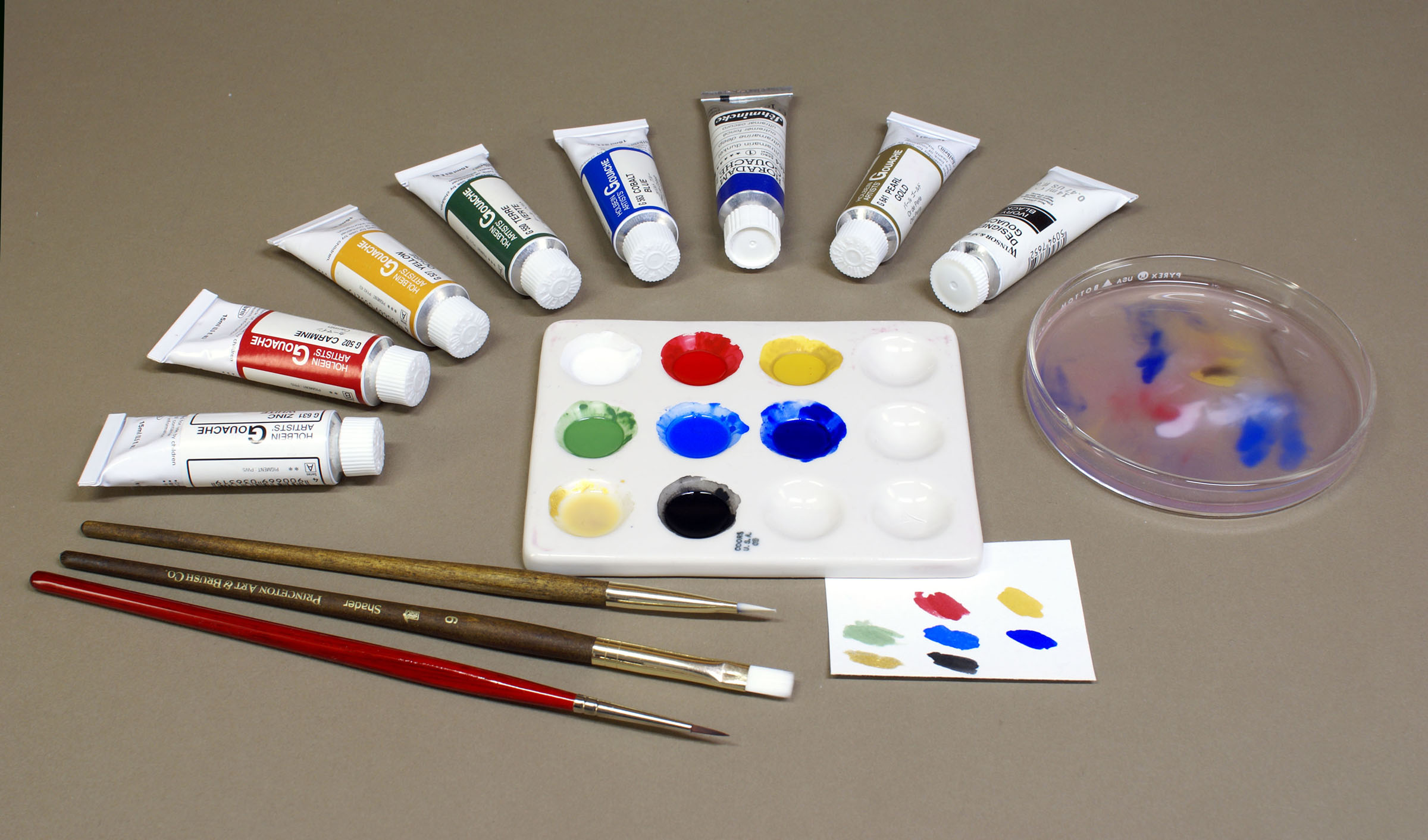
Gouache paints come in many colors and are usually mixed with water to achieve the desired working properties and to control the opacity when dry.

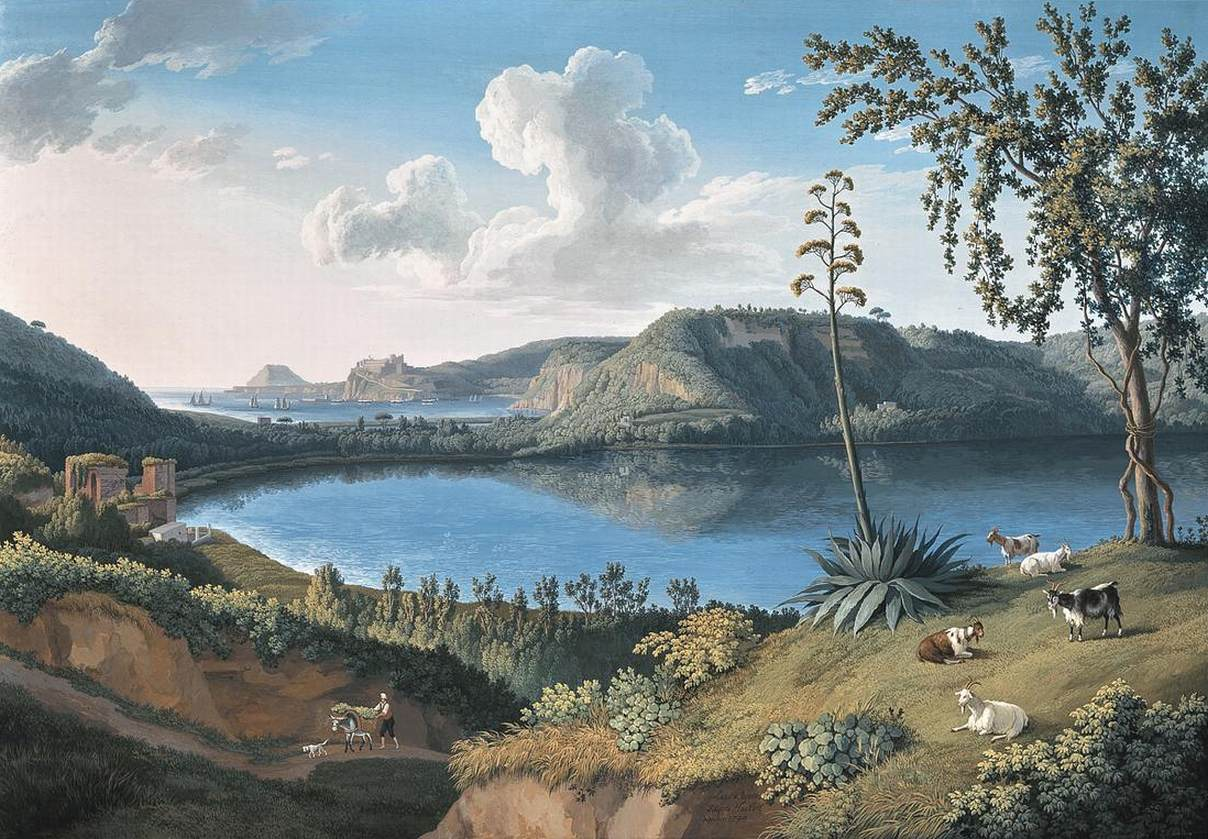
Jacob Philipp Hackert, Lago d'Averno, 1794

Gouache (/ɡuˈɑːʃ, ɡwɑːʃ/; French: [ɡwaʃ]), body color, (Note: The alternative term "body color" is sometimes one word "bodycolor".) or opaque watercolor is a water-medium paint consisting of natural pigment, water, a binding agent (usually gum arabic or dextrin), and sometimes additional inert material. Gouache is designed to be opaque. Gouache has a long history, having been used for at least twelve centuries. It is used most consistently by commercial artists for posters, illustrations, comics, and other design work.

Gouache is similar to watercolor in that it can be rewetted and dried to a matte finish, and the paint can become infused into its paper support. It is similar to acrylic or oil paints in that it is normally used in an opaque painting style and it can form a superficial layer. Many manufacturers of watercolor paints also produce gouache, and the two can easily be used together.

== Description ==
Gouache paint is similar to watercolor, but it is modified to make it opaque. Just as in watercolor, the binding agent has traditionally been gum arabic but since the late nineteenth century cheaper varieties use yellow dextrin. When the paint is sold as a paste, often in tubes, the dextrin has usually been mixed with an equal volume of water. To improve the adhesive and hygroscopic qualities of the paint, as well as the flexibility of the rather brittle paint layer after drying, propylene glycol is often added. Gouache differs from watercolor in that the particles are typically larger, the ratio of pigment to binder is much higher, and an additional white filler such as chalk—a "body"—may be part of the paint. This makes gouache heavier and more opaque than watercolor, and endows it with greater reflective qualities.

Gouache generally dries to a value that differs from the one it has when wet (lighter tones generally dry darker and darker tones tend to dry lighter), which can make it difficult to match colors over multiple painting sessions. Its quick coverage and total hiding power mean that gouache lends itself to more direct painting techniques than watercolor. "En plein air" paintings take advantage of this, as do the works of J. M. W. Turner.

Gouache is today much used by commercial artists for works such as posters, illustrations, comics, and for other design work. Most 20th-century animations used it to create an opaque color on a cel with watercolor paint used for the backgrounds. Using gouache as "poster paint" is desirable for its speed as the paint layer dries completely by the relatively quick evaporation of the water.

The use of gouache is not restricted to the basic opaque painting techniques using a brush and watercolor paper. It is often applied with an airbrush. As with all types of paint, gouache has been used on unusual surfaces from Braille paper to cardboard. A variation of traditional application is the method used in the gouaches découpées (cut collages) created by Henri Matisse. His Blue Nudes series is a good example of the technique. A new variation in the formula of the paint is acrylic gouache.

== History ==
A form of gouache, with honey or tragacanth gum as a binder, was used in Ancient Egyptian painting. Producers of European illuminated manuscripts, and of Persian miniatures, also used gouache. (Although often characterised as "watercolor", Persian miniatures and Mughal miniatures are predominantly examples of gouache.) The English word "gouache", derived via French gouache from the Italian guazzo, also refers to paintings using this opaque method. Guazzo, Italian for "mud", was originally a term applied to the early 16th-century practice of applying oil paint over a tempera base, which could give a matted effect. In 18th-century France the term gouache was applied to opaque watermedia.

During the eighteenth century artists often used gouache in a mixed technique, for adding fine details in pastel paintings. Gouache was typically made by mixing watercolours based on gum arabic with an opaque white pigment. In the nineteenth century, watercolours began to be industrially produced and packaged in tubes (invented in 1841), and a "Chinese white" tube was added to paintboxes for this purpose. Gouache tends to be used in conjunction with watercolor, and often with ink or pencil, in 19th-century paintings.

Later that century, for decorative uses gouache-like "poster paint" was mass-produced, based on the much cheaper dextrin binder, and sold in cans or as a powder for mixing with water. The dextrin replaced older paint-types based on hide glue or size. During the twentieth century, manufacturers began specially producing gouache in tubes for more refined artistic purposes. Initially, gum arabic was used as a binder, but soon cheaper brands were based on dextrin, as is most paint for use by children.

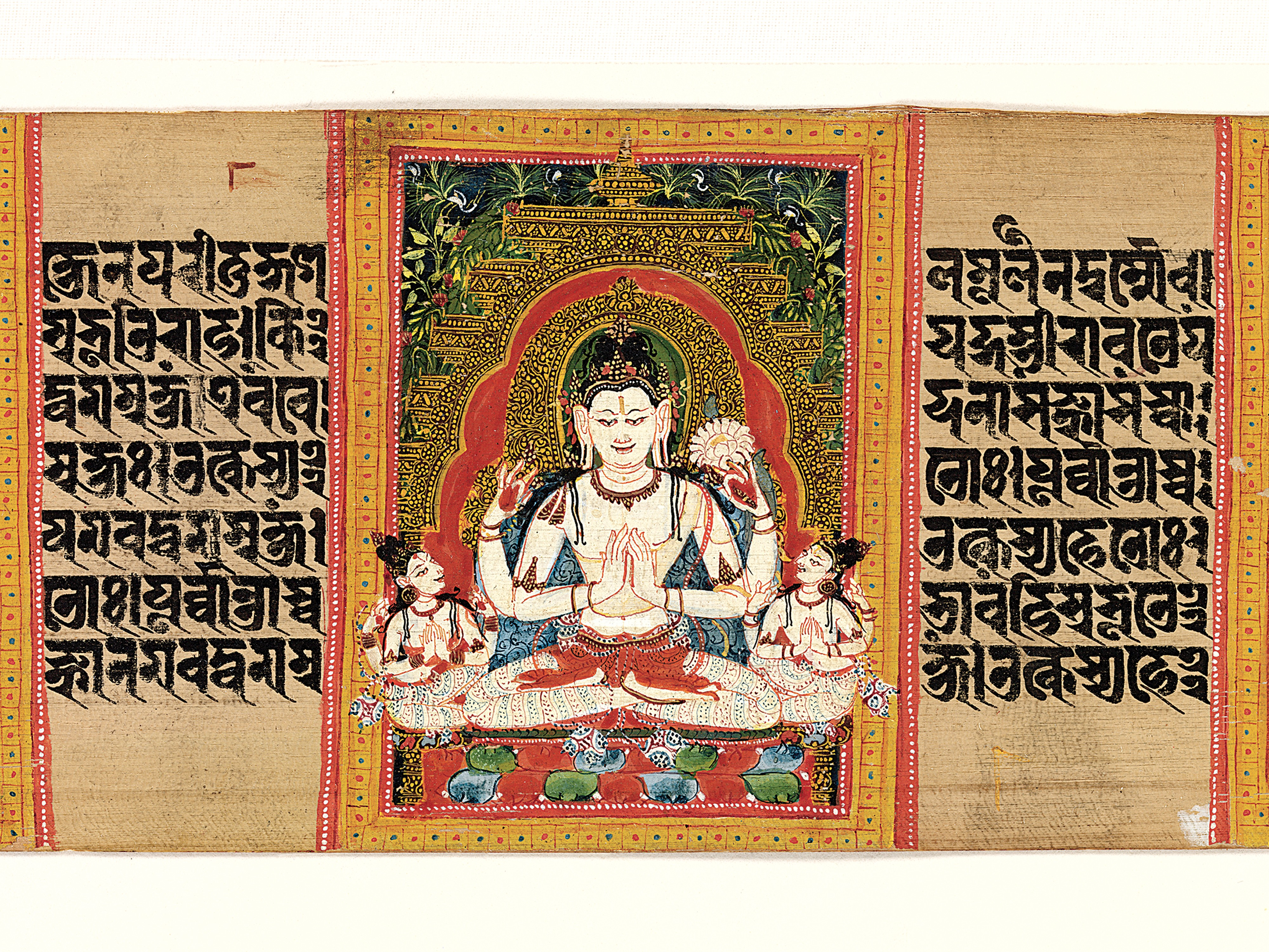
12th-century Buddhist manuscript, India

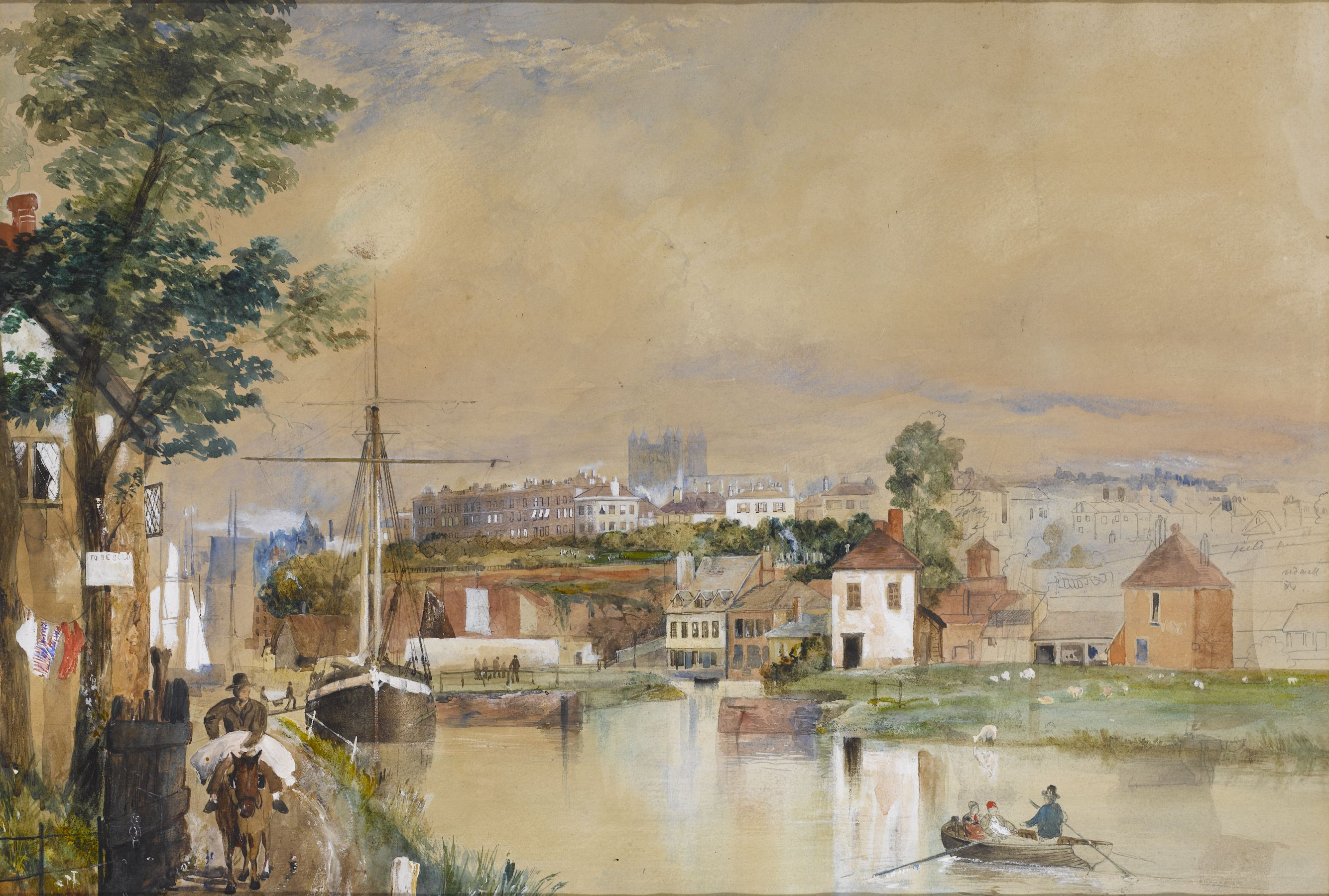
Exeter and the Canal Basin by John Gendall between 1835 and 1840; watercolour and gouache on paper

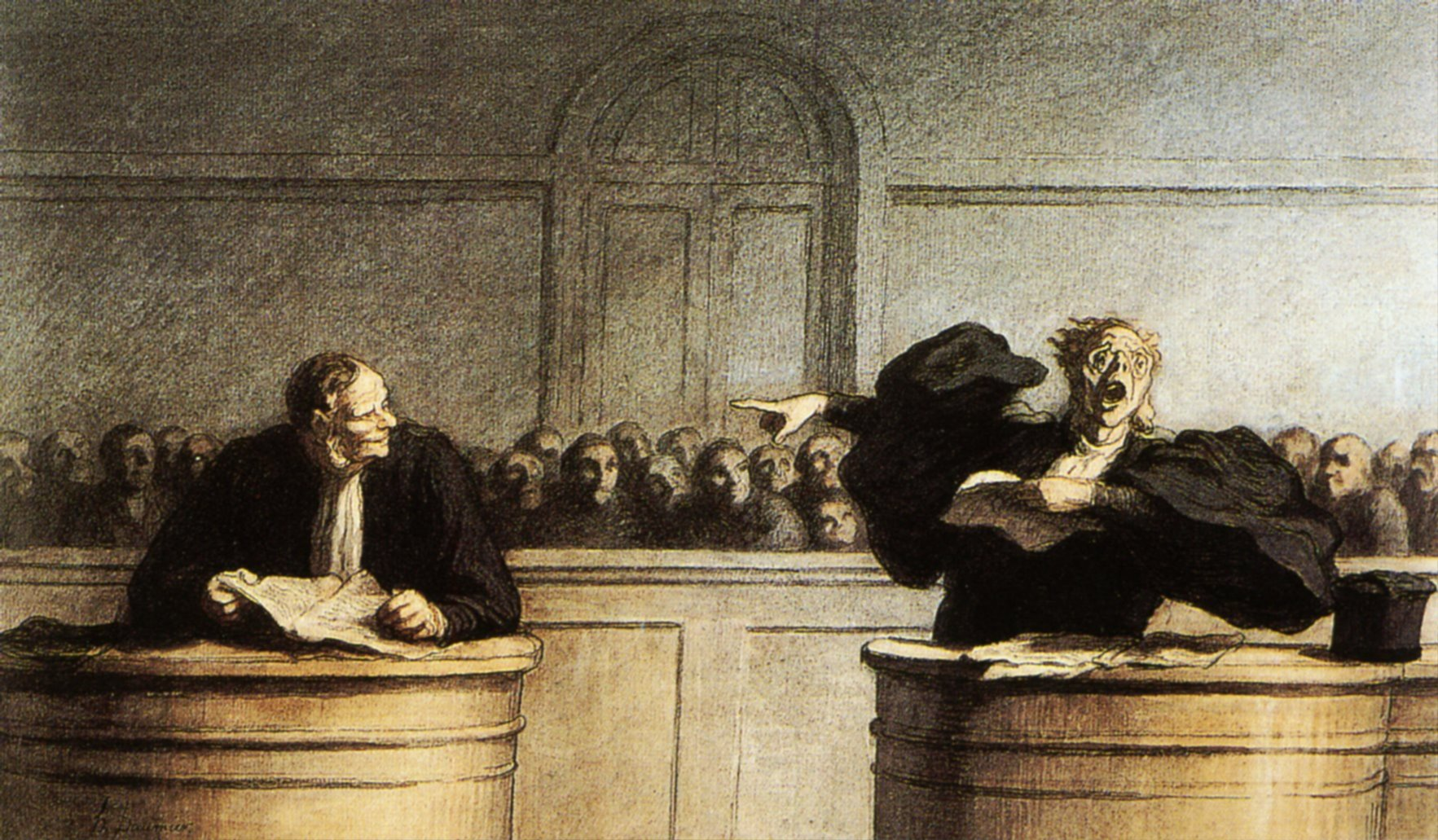
Honoré Daumier, Une cause célèbre, c. 1862

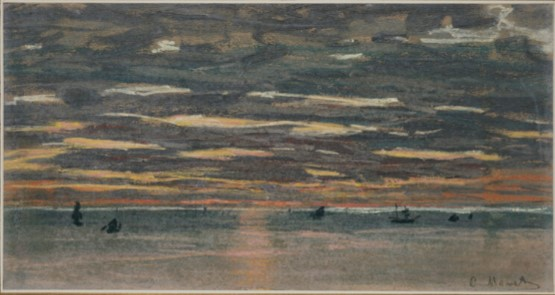
Claude Monet, Sunset at Sea, 1865–70, Ashmolean Museum, Oxford

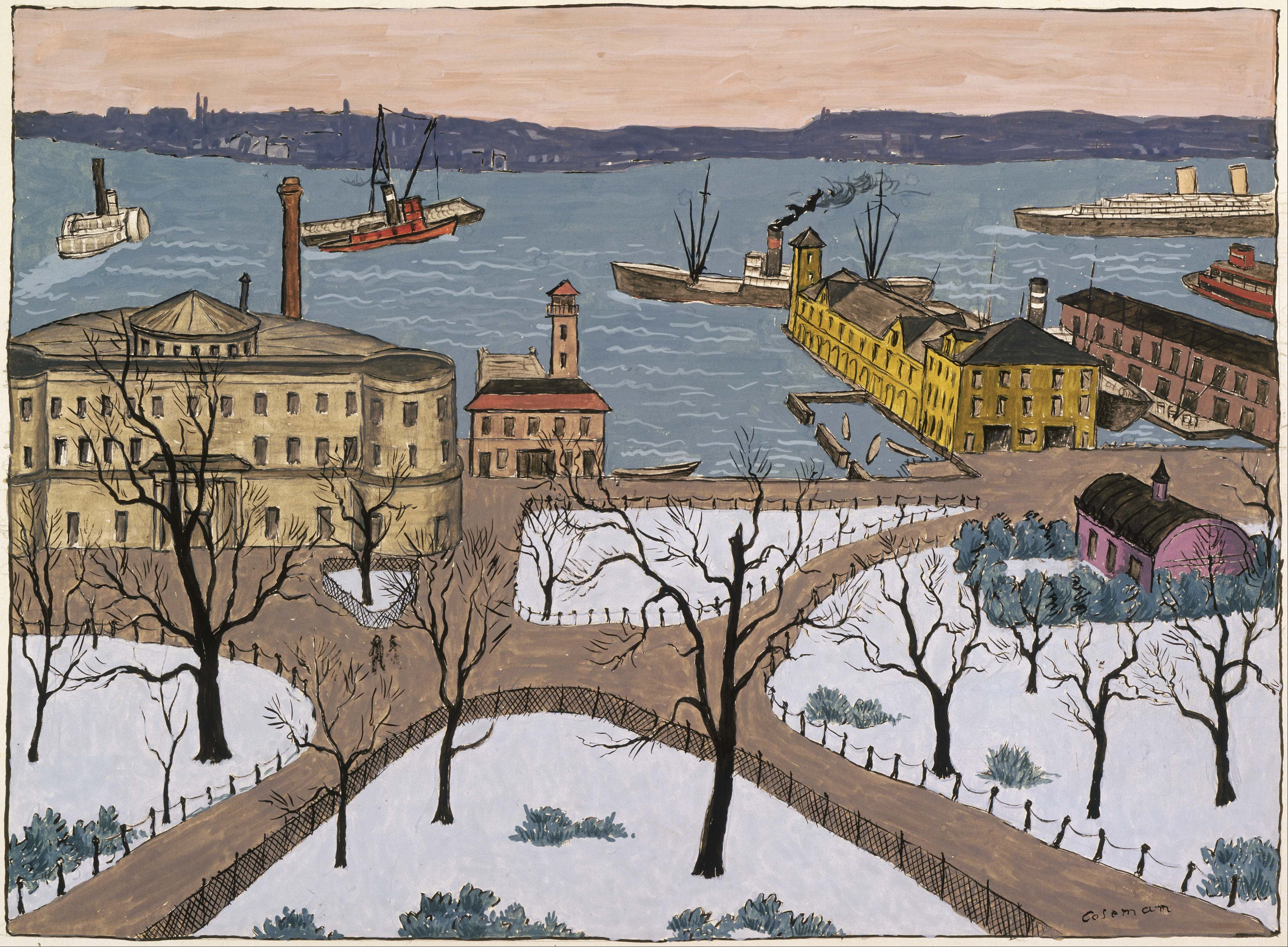
Battery Park in New York by Glenn O. Coleman (1887–1932), 31 cm × 42 cm (12 1/4 in × 16 1/2 in)

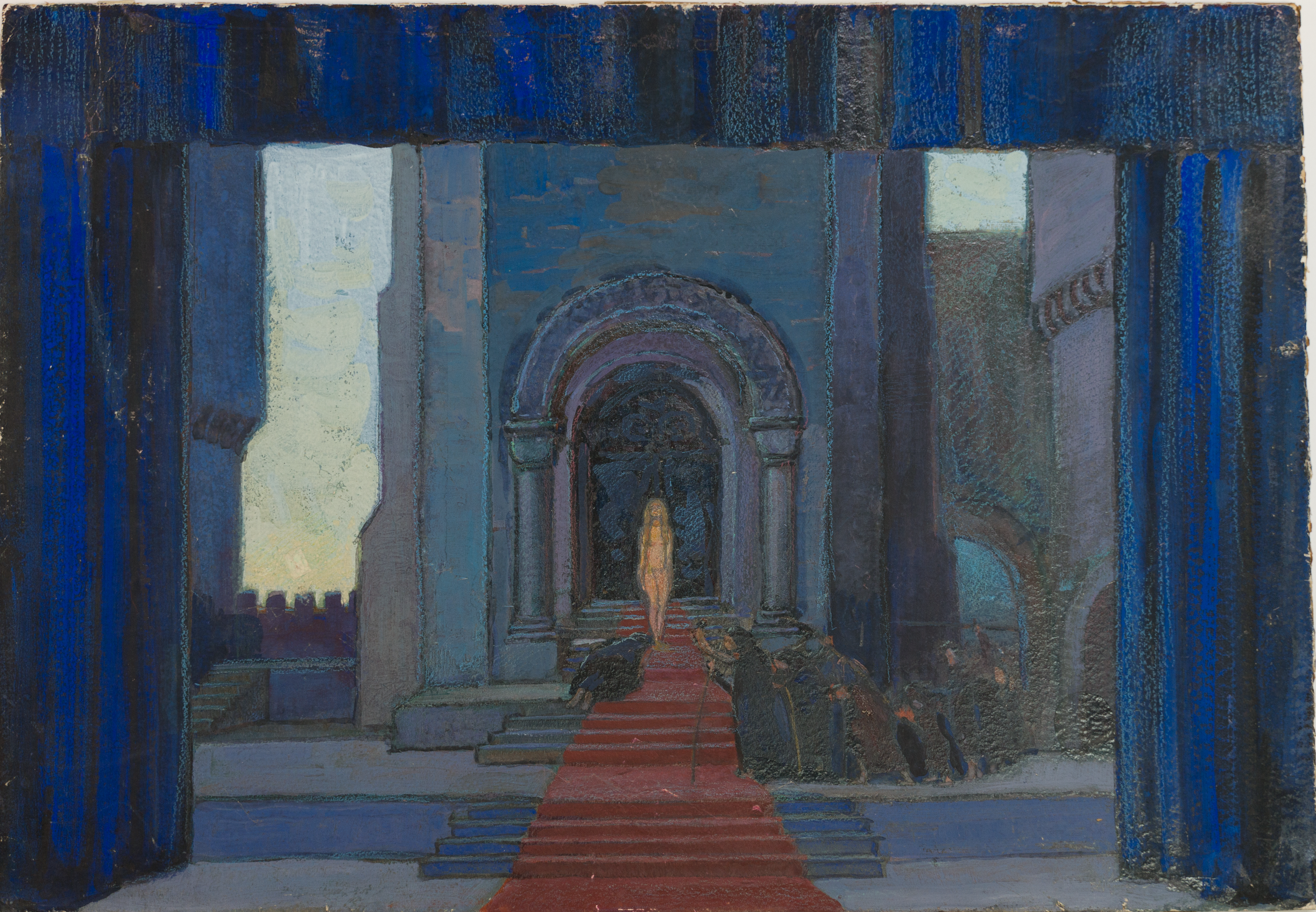
Roman Nyman, stage design for a drama, 1923. Tartu Art Museum, Estonia

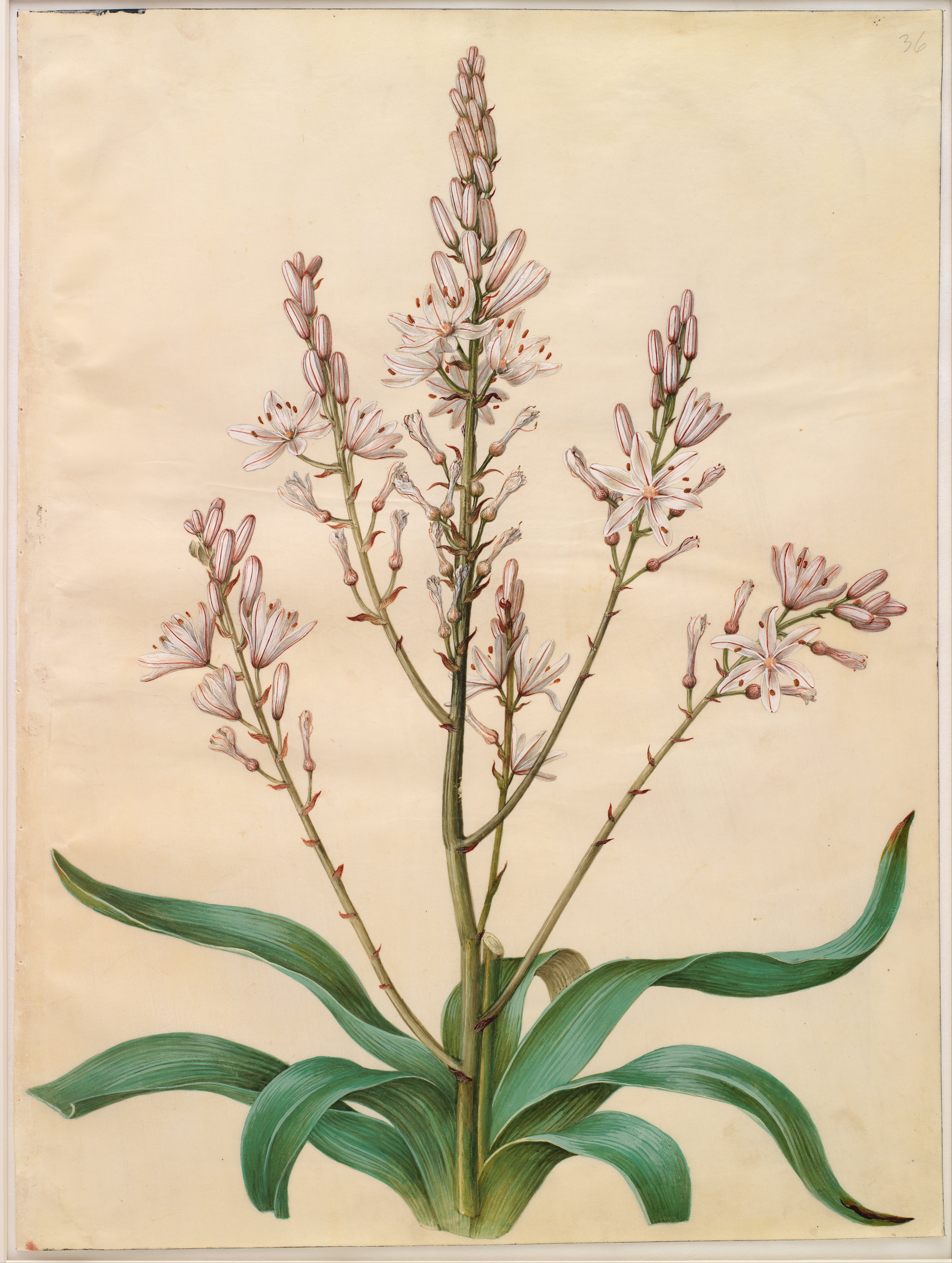
Asphodelus ramosus by Hans Simon Holtzbecker, 1649–1659, gouache on parchment, 50.5 cm × 38.5 cm (20 in × 15 1/4 in)

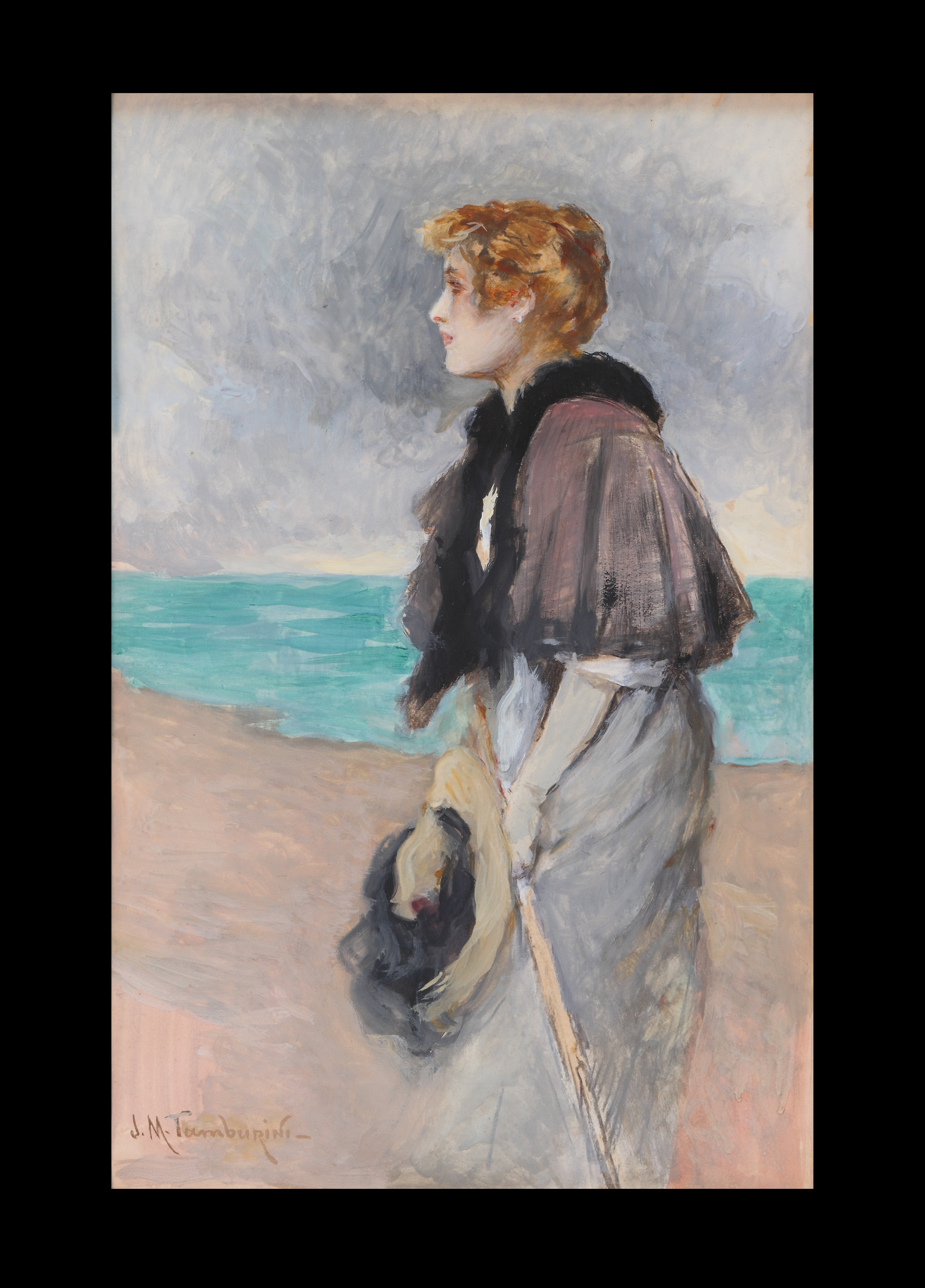
Josep Maria Tamburini, Young Girl with a Hat, 1909, 38 cm × 25 cm (15 in × 9 3/4 in)

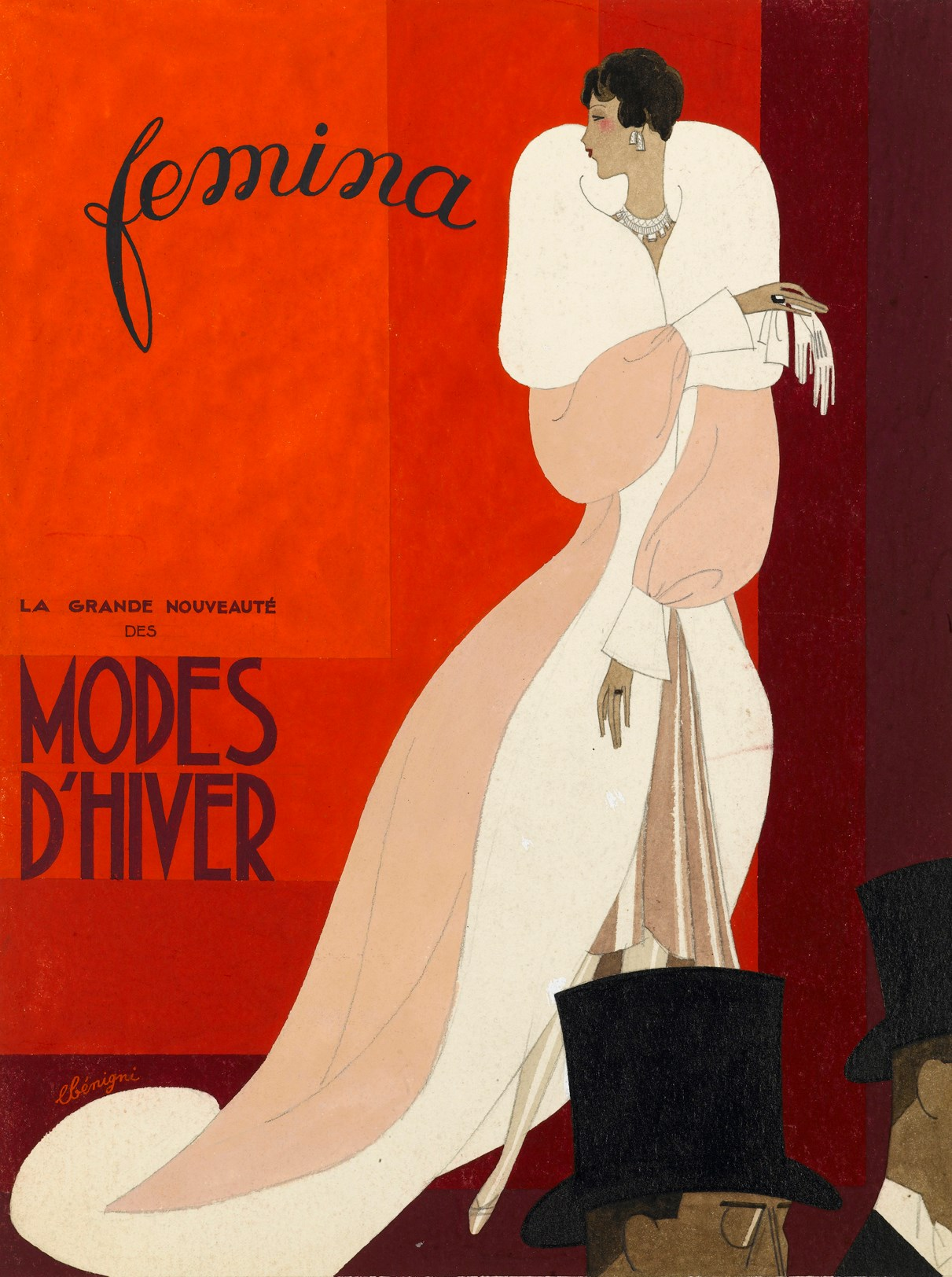
Léon Benigni, cover design for Femina magazine, 1920s

== Acrylic gouache ==
A relatively new variation in the formula of the paint is acrylic gouache. Its highly concentrated pigment is similar to traditional gouache, but it is mixed with an acrylic-based binder, unlike traditional gouache, which is mixed with gum arabic. It is water-soluble when wet and dries to a matte, opaque, and water-resistant surface when dry. Acrylic gouache differs from acrylic paint because it contains additives to ensure a matte finish.

== See also ==
- Decalcomania

== Sources ==
- "Bodycolor", thedrawingsite.com, 2009, web: TDS-bodycolor(archived 2012-02-27).
- Gouache at MSN Encarta-8754 archived 2009-10-28
