= Parabaik =

Burmese book format

- Burma (Myanmar)
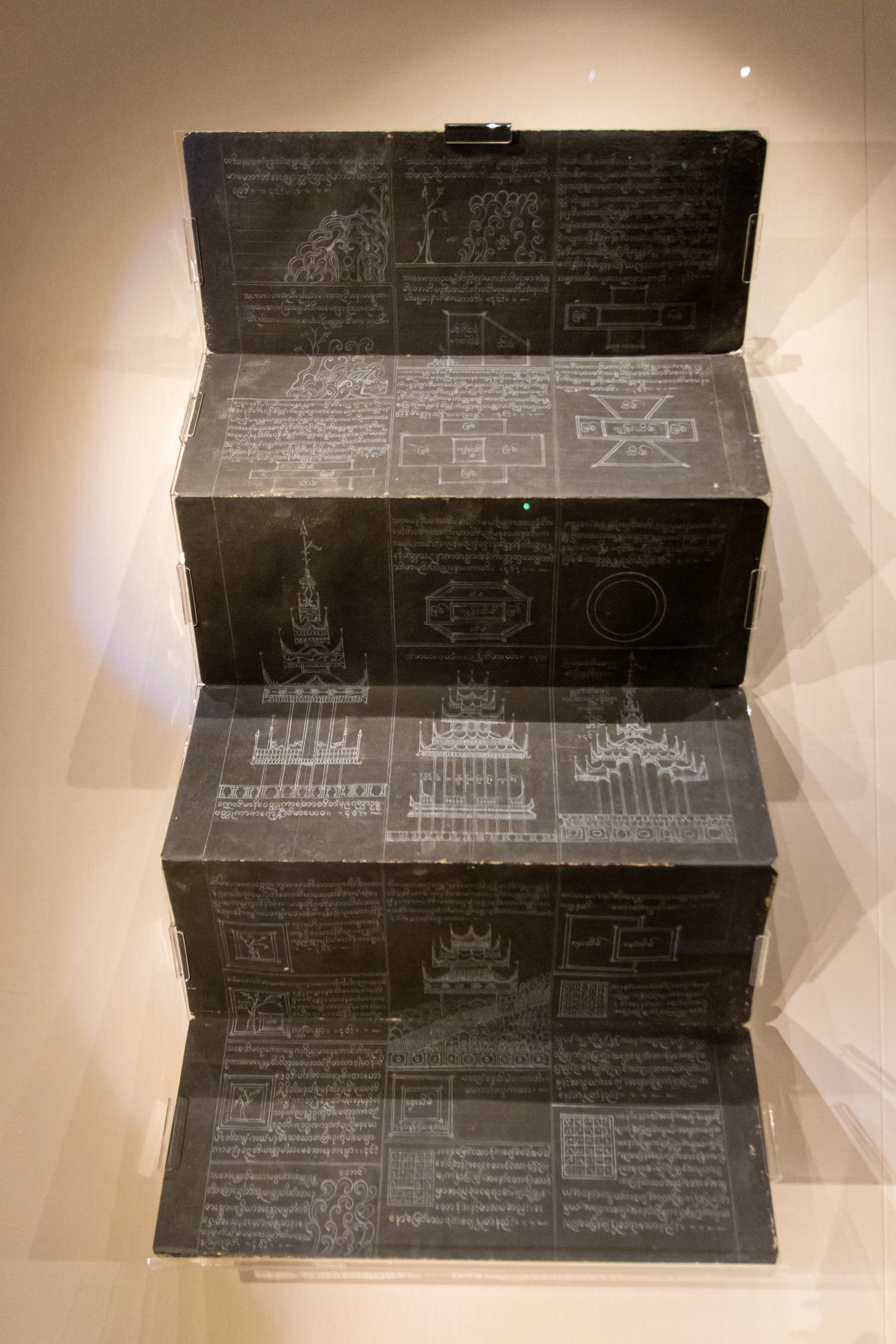
- Black parabaik, c. 1875 CE
- Also known as: Shan: pap tup
- Type: Folding book manuscript
- Date: bef. 16th century - late 19th cen.
- Languages: Pali; Burmese; Shan
- Patron: Toungoo dynasty; Konbaung dynasty
- Material: Mulberry paper
- Size: Folio: 17 by 7 in (43 by 18 cm) to 48 by 18 in (122 by 46 cm)
- Format: Folding book
- Script: Mon–Burmese script
- Illumination: Burmese Buddhist art
- Exemplar: Burmese chronicles (Maha Yazawin)

The parabaik (Note: also parabeik, parabike) (Burmese: ပုရပိုက်; pronounced [pəɹəbaiʔ]) is a Burmese-culture folding book manuscript. Used concurrently with palm-leaf manuscripts since at least before the 16th century, two main varieties of parabaik were used: black parabaiks served as erasable notebooks, and white parabaiks were used for official documents, and as a support for Burmese art. Use of parabaiks was usurped by the European codex after the British conquest of Burma. Historical parabaiks are valued in codicological research for both Burmese state chronicles, as well as examples of ephemera and gray literature.

== History ==
The majority of Burmese chronicles were originally written on parabaik.

== Use outside Burma ==
Use of parabaik outside of Burma is rare. A black parabaik palimpsest of Islamic syair exists that was written in 15th January 1835 in Jawi script by a Patani Sultanate scribe, for a Burmese jurist. The parabaik was written in portrait orientation.

=== Related manuscript types ===
Thailand has a related folding book manuscript tradition of the samut thai, also called samut khoi.

== Construction and use ==
Parabaiks are made from thick paper. The standard paper was saa paper (ရှမ်း, lit. 'Shan'), a mulberry paper sourced from Shan communities and often referred to by their craft village (e.g. "Minegaing paper", "Maingkaing paper"). Mango tree-bark paper (သရက်ချဉ်, thayet-chin) was a lower-grade alternative to saa paper used in the 18th to 19th century. Bamboo paper was also used as a low-grade option for drafts and duplicates; laid bamboo paper (ဝါးရှာထိုး, wa-shahto) was stronger and smoother than ordinary, coarse bamboo paper (ဝါးရိုးရိုး, wa-yo-yo).

The paper is glued into a very long sheet and folded in a concertina fashion, with the front and back lacquered to form protective covers or attached to decorative covers. Parabaiks range in size from 17 by 7 in (43 by 18 cm) to 48 by 18 in (122 by 46 cm); lower-grade paper is typically favored as the manuscript dimensions increase.

=== Black parabaik ===
"Black" parabaiks (ပုရပိုက်နတ်, parabaik net) are given a black, tacky finish using ground charcoal, adhered with rice starch or animal glue. Black parabaik are written on using white soapstone crayons (ကန့်သူ, kangu, kan-gu-zan); these markings can be erased, and the entire surface re-blackened for use as a palimpsest. Black parabaik were used for note-taking, sketching, and drafting.

=== White parabaik ===
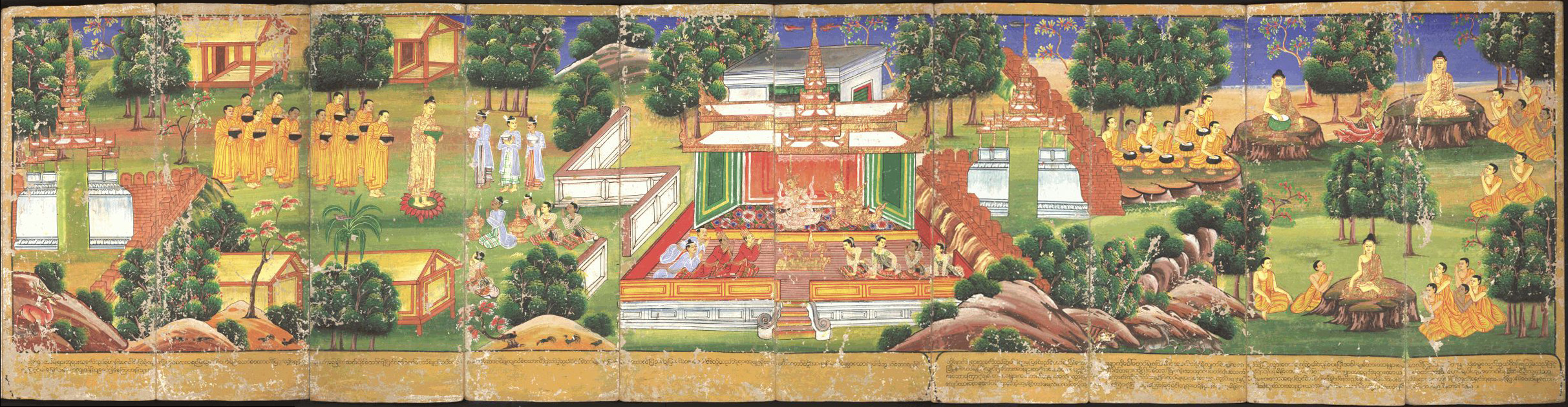
18th cen. parabaik depicting the life of Buddha

The "white" parabaik (ပုရပိုက်ဖြူ, parabaik phyu) is left uncolored, or else sized with entada seeds or rice starch.

White parabaiks are used for painting, called parabaik bagyi (ရေတင်စုံပရိတ်).

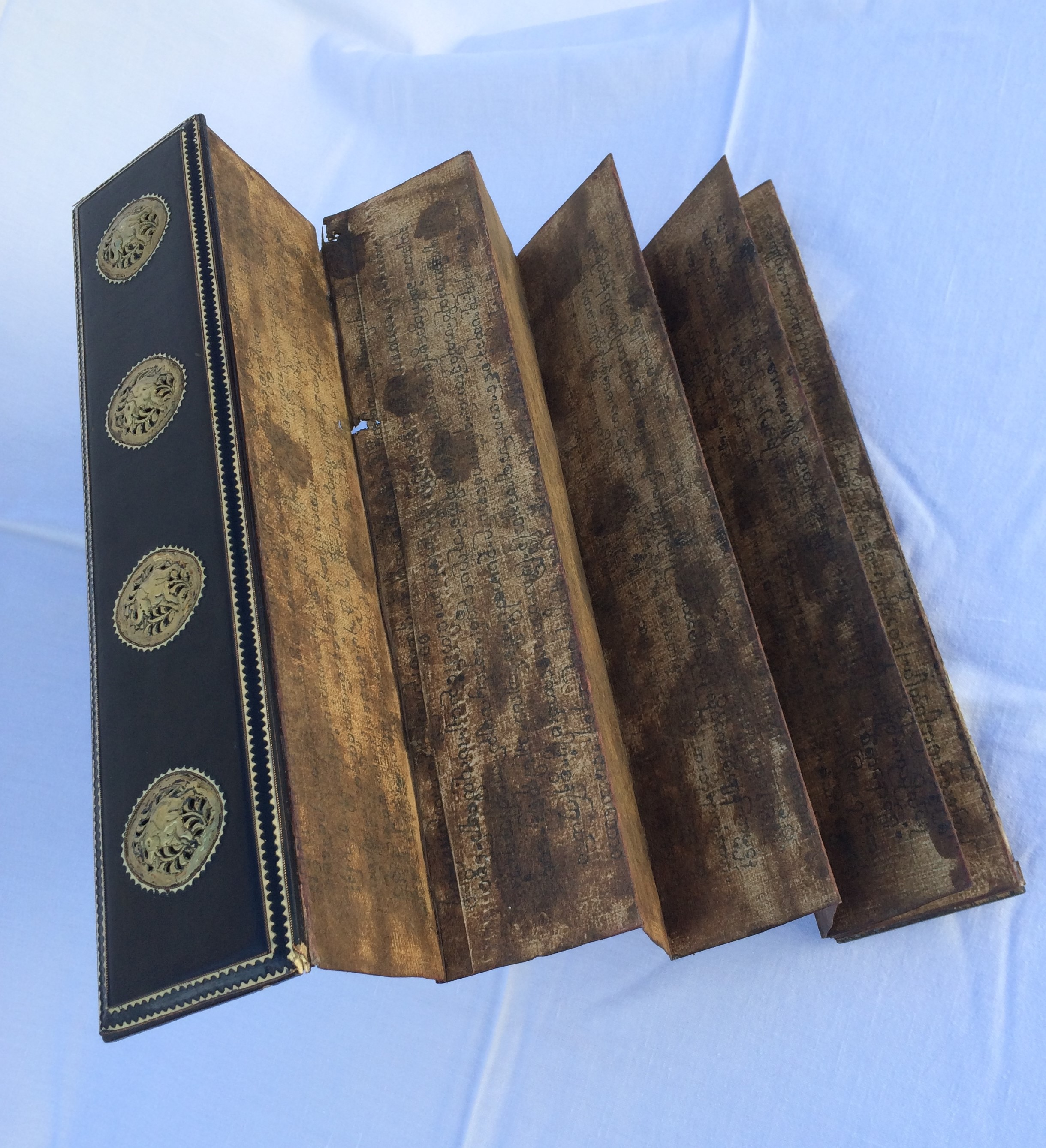
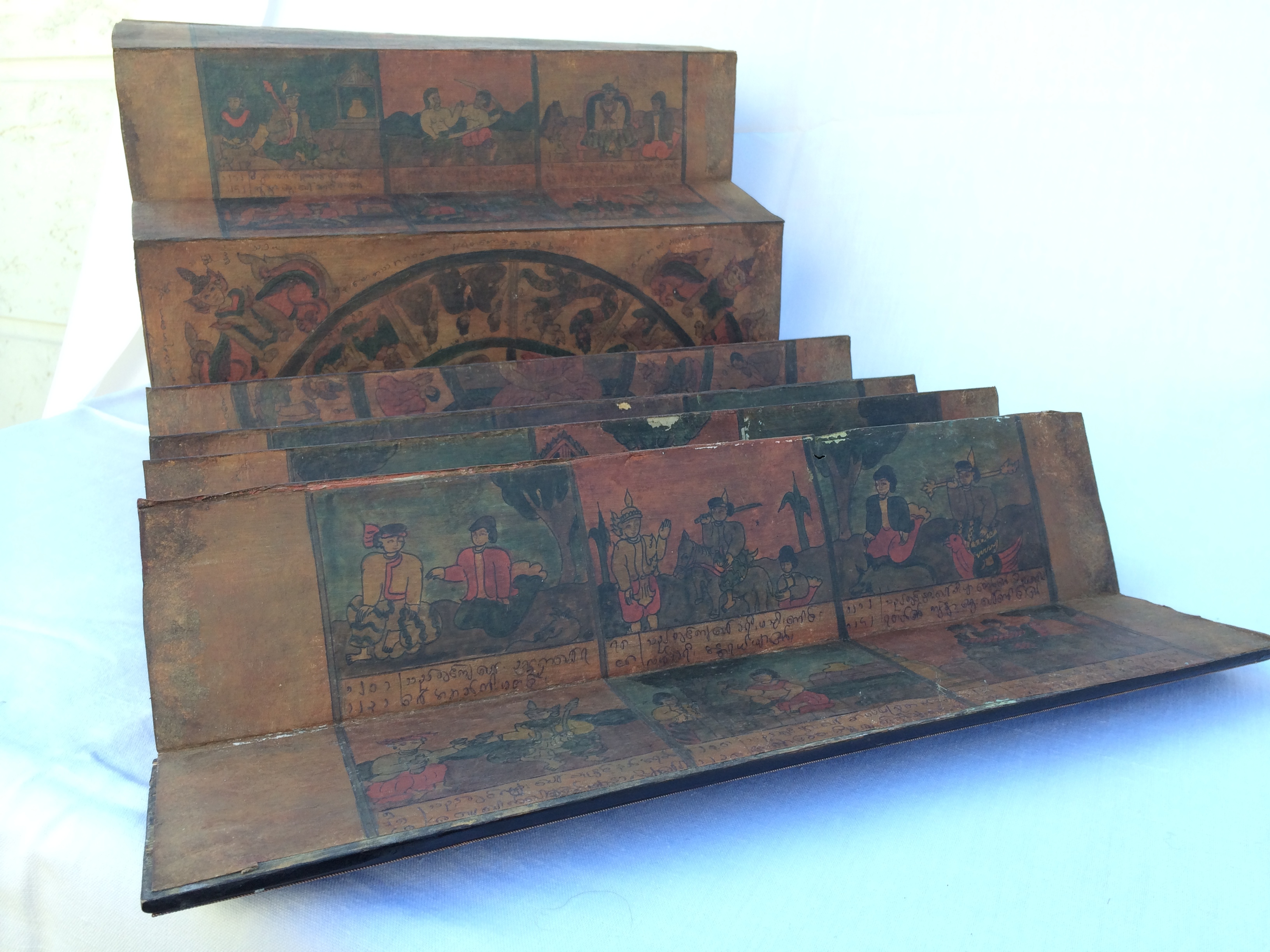
A Buddhist parabaik with writing on one side and illumination on the other

=== Method of use ===
Textual parabaik are typically read by opening them two pages at a time, flipping a fold forward to expose the next pair in sequence.

== Conservation ==
Parabaiks are susceptible to pest damage, water damage, and decay. The glue that keeps the accordion together may also fail, splitting the document into loose folios.

The Universities' Central Library in Yangon houses the country's largest collection of traditional manuscripts, including 4,000 parabaiks.
