= Khoi paper =

Paper made in Southeast Asian from khoi

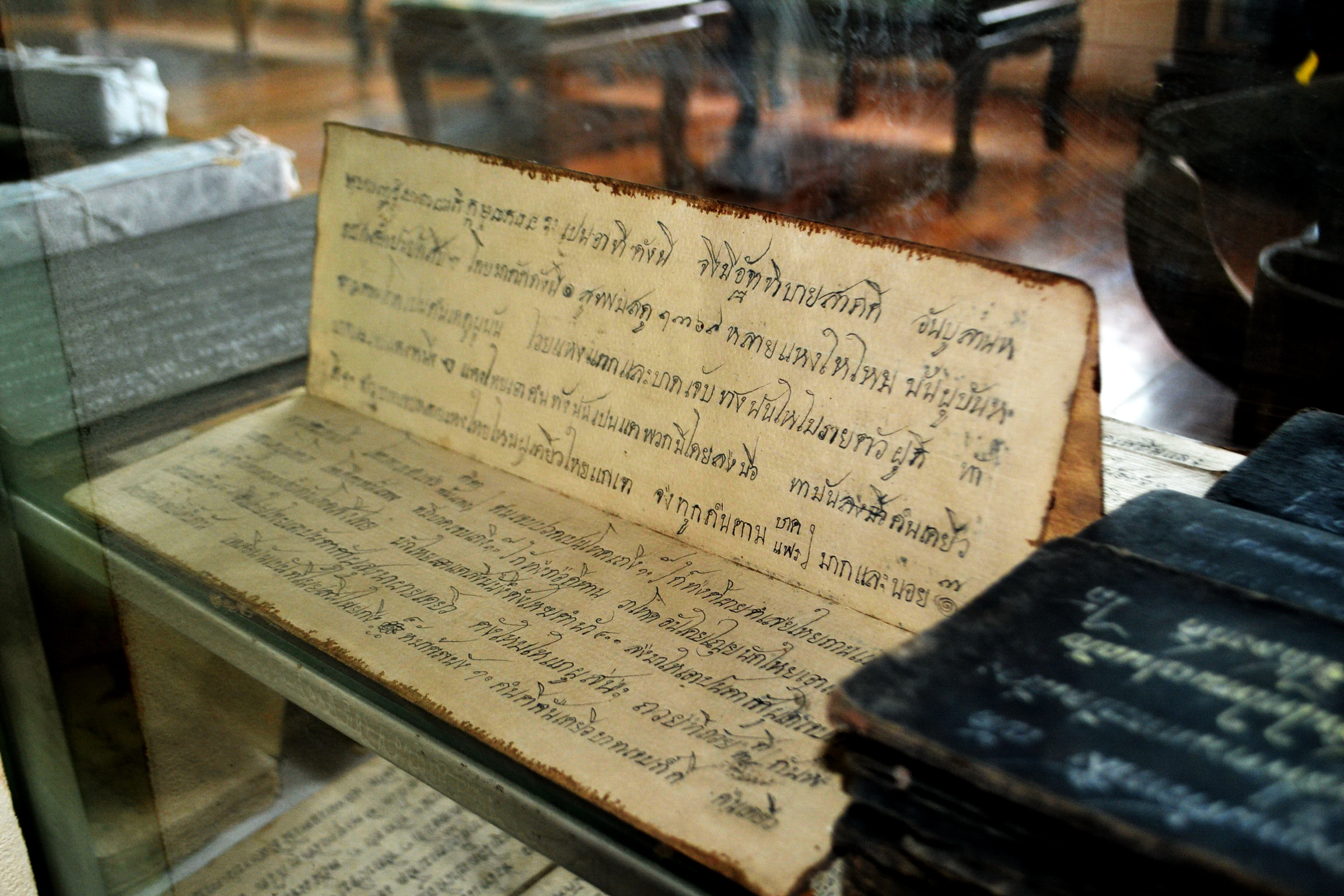
- Samut khoi
- Type: Handmade paper
- Material: Streblus asper bark
- Place of origin: Thailand; Cambodia

Khoi paper (Note: a.k.a. Coi paper) (Thai: ข่อย; Khmer: ស្នាយ, snay) or Streblus paper is a Thai and Khmer paper made from the khoi, Streblus asper.

== History ==
Khoi paper has been produced in Thailand since between the 15th and late 17th century. The first Western account of khoi paper was from Simon de la Loubère in the court of Narai the Great, 1687-1688.

=== Samut khoi ===
A primary use of the paper is for the samut khoi (Khmer: kraing), an unbound folding-book manuscript. Khoi paper is stronger and more resistant to yellowing than the regionally available saa paper, making it preferred for the folding manuscripts. Samut khoi are primarily used for secular writing, while palm-leaf manuscripts are preferred for Buddhist literature.

== Production ==
Khoi paper production begins with the bark of the khoi tree. The bark is sun-dried, then soaked for 3 to 4 days until it can be shredded. The shredded bark is soaked in an alkaline solution, steamed and returned to the solution for a day to become pulp. The pulp is made into a slurry, then screened with a deckle into sheets. White pages are dyed with ground rice flour; black pages are dyed with charcoal.

== See also ==
- Saa paper
