= Spadea (surname) =

Spadea is an Italian surname. Notable people with the surname include:

- Bill Spadea (born 1969), American businessman and television host
- Luanne Spadea (born 1972), American tennis player
- Vince Spadea (born 1974), former professional tennis player

== See also ==
- Spadea, type of periodical
