= Leporello =

Leporello may refer to:

- Don Giovanni's servant in Mozart's opera, Don Giovanni.
- A type of folding book
