= Universities' Central Library =

Academic library in Myanmar

- တက္ကသိုလ်များဗဟိုစာကြည့်တိုက်
- 16°49′50″N 96°08′10″E
- Location: University of Yangon, Kamayut Township, Yangon, Myanmar
- Type: Academic
- Established: 1929; 97 years ago
- Architect: Kin Maung Lwin

Collection
- Items collected: Books; parabaiks; palm-leaf manuscripts
- Size: 600,000 books, 15,000 palm-leaf manuscripts, 4,000 parabaiks

Other information
- Parent organization: Ministry of Education (Myanmar)
- Website: www.uclmyanmar.org

The Universities' Central Library (Burmese: တက္ကသိုလ်များဗဟိုစာကြည့်တိုက်; abbreviated UCL) is an academic library located on the University of Yangon campus in Yangon, Myanmar. UCL is Myanmar's biggest academic library and plays a pivotal role in collecting and preserving historical Burmese manuscripts. UCL has the largest collection of traditional manuscripts in the country, including 15,000 palm-leaf manuscripts and 4,000 parabaiks. The library possesses 600,000 books.

== History ==
In 1929, the Rangoon University Library was established as a research and reference library. During World War II, the library building and rare manuscript collections were destroyed, and the library re-opened in 1952. In 1964, the library was renamed the Universities' Central Library. UCL began collecting parabaiks in 1964.

In 1973, a modern replacement building to house the library was designed by Kin Maung Lwin, slated for completion in early 1975. The 1974 U Thant funeral crisis at the university delayed construction, which was finally completed in 1980. In 1987, the Yangon University Library was established in UCL's old premises.

Prominent Burmese scholar, Thaw Kaung served as UCL's chief librarian from 1969 to 1997.

In 2016, it co-founded the Myanmar Academic Library Consortium to foster collaboration among academic libraries in the country.
