= Folding book =

Type of book or pamphlet

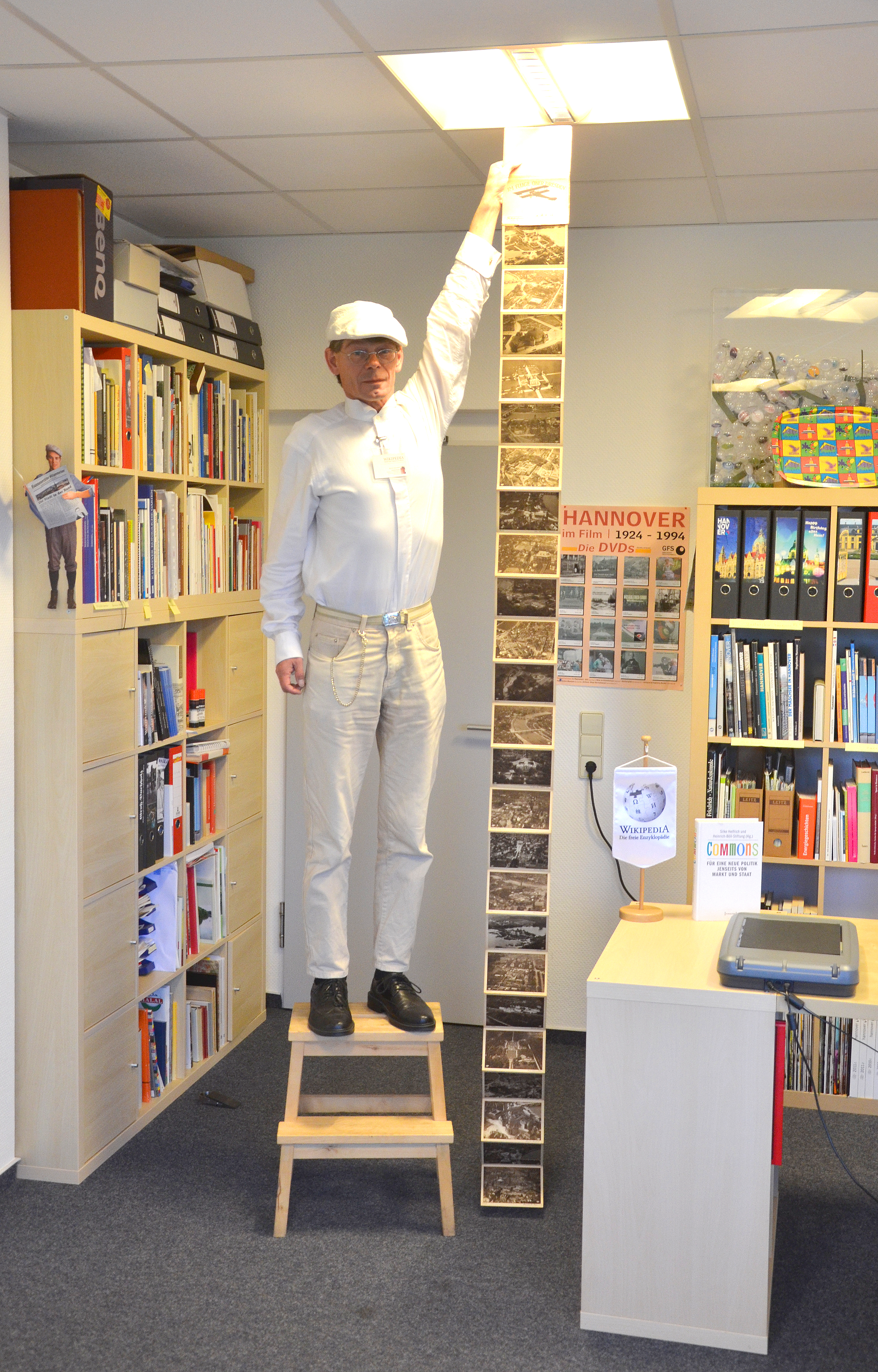
Leporello of 24 postcards of Dresden aerial photographs, by Deutsche Luft-Reederei

A folding book is a book or pamphlet typified by a continuous unbound paper sheet, folded as to form folios. A folding book folded in repeated parallel alternating folds, in the fashion of an accordion pleat, is further known as a concertina, accordion, or leporello.

== Construction ==
=== Leporello ===
The style of folding is similar to that of the air bellows of a concertina or the eponymous accordion, such that every written page faces another written page when the book is closed. It may therefore be opened to any page. It may have a cover attached to the front and back end sections of the book, or holes in the back cover to allow the book to be "laced." The name derives from a visual gag associated with a scene in Mozart's Don Giovanni, where Giovanni's servant Leporello produces a small book or paper with a list of his master's affairs, only to reveal that it is folded up and in fact is enormously long.

== Folding book manuscript ==
A folding-book manuscript is from one of many pre-modern hand-written folding book traditions.

== Modern examples ==
- Brochure
- Single-sheet chapbook

== See also ==
- Accordion
- Concertina
- Don Giovanni, an opera featuring the eponymous Leporello
- Dog-ear
- Folded almanac
- Obi (publishing)
- Spadea
