= Folded almanac =

Medieval medical and astrological manuscript

A folded almanac, sometimes called a physicians folded calendar, girdle book, or vade mecum, refers to a type of medieval English almanac consisting of multiple folios which are folded multiple times and bound together to create a dense yet compact vessel for information which would be used in medical practice. For durability and transport, folded almanacs would often have a cover of leather, a durable knitted cover, or be contained in a small box. These covers were necessary to protect the delicate folios from the constant wear of use and friction against the users clothing. Boxes would be necessary in climates prone to rainfall such as England. Attached to the outer cover, a cord would allow the almanac's user to easily transport and access the almanac by attaching it to their belt, however few covers or cords survive.

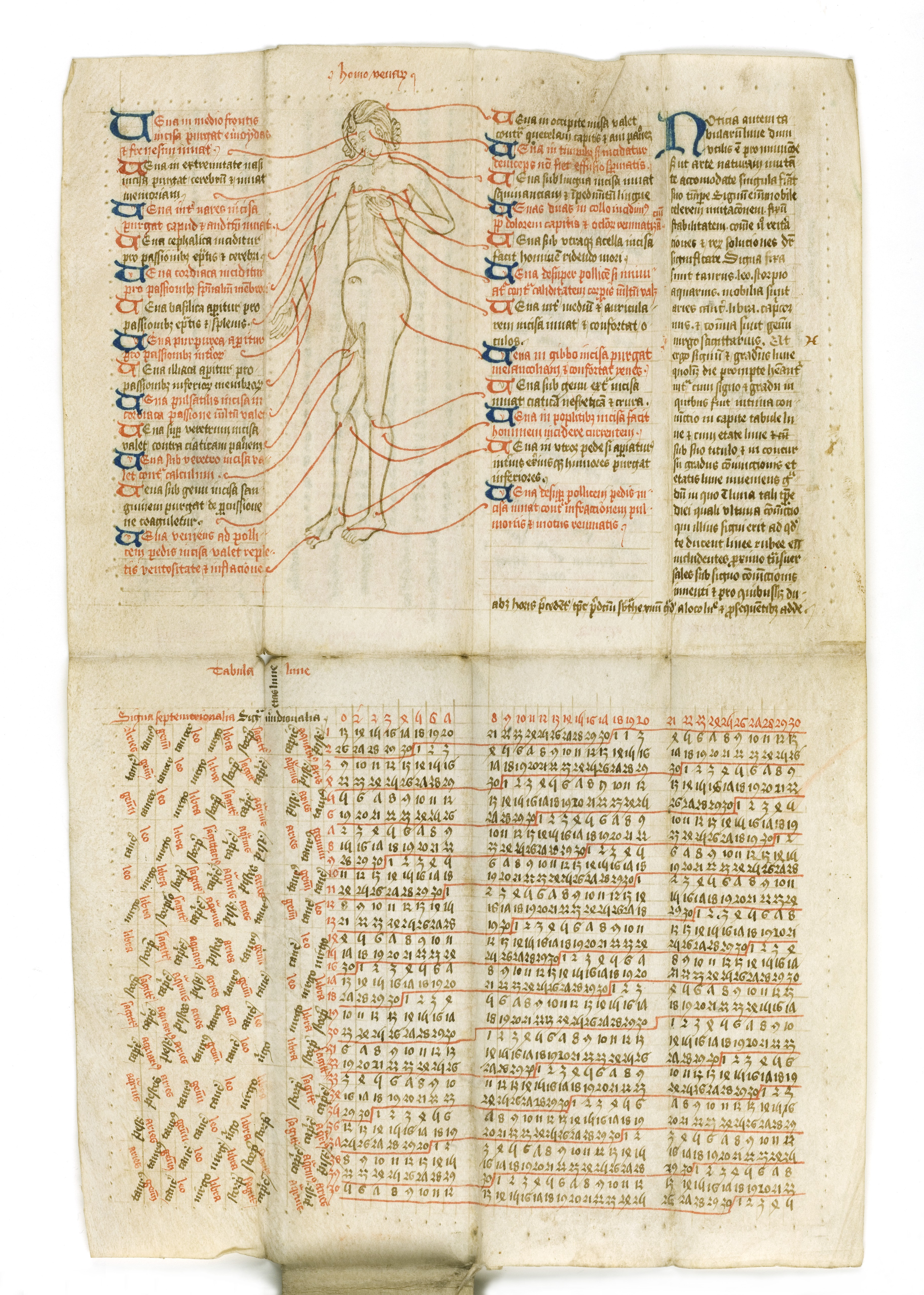
London, Wellcome MS 40 (1463), fol. 5v, unfolded to 10 × 6.7 inches, showing Vein Man (top) and a lunar table (bottom).

These almanacs contained astro-medical knowledge as well as a calendar. In medieval medicine, it was necessary to be familiar with basic anatomy, astrology, zodiac signs and urine tables. Understanding the interaction between body parts, humors, their associated zodiac signs, and how the body changes depending on the time of the year would be considered basic medical knowledge in the medieval period. In English almanacs, the figures of the Vein Man and the Zodiac Man would be used to find the location of veins for bloodletting and which zodiac signs are associated with different body parts. The compact nature of the folded almanac would provide medical practitioners of the era with a quick reference for the specific dates and zodiac signs that would aid them in curing ailments. The almanac acted as a tool to perform the necessary astrological calculation of medieval medicine.

Because of their small size and constant folding and unfolding, few of these almanacs have survived relative to the number which likely existed. Due to this as well as overlap with other classifications of manuscript, little specialist research has been done into this rare type of almanac. Despite this, the folded almanac gives useful insight into the everyday practice of medieval physicians and medieval medical knowledge and belief.

== Origins ==
The origins of the folded almanac containing astro-medical information lies in earlier folded liturgical calendars. The term vade mecum (lit. ‘come with me’) refers generically to any portable manuscript but commonly denotes the small liturgical texts that traveling Franciscans and Dominicans would take in order to perform their religious duties. These calendars would contain astrological tables that would allow their user to calculate the date of Christian feast days, both fixed and movable, in any given year.

By the 12th century, the term "almanac" would be used to describe calendars that included more advanced scientific data. Over the course of the 13th and 14th centuries highly educated calculators working under noble patronage would transform the calendar into a tool for solar, lunar, and astrological calculation. At the end of the 14th century, the terms calendar and almanac would overlap to the point of interchangeability in many circumstances, although modern academic classification refers to the medieval English folded almanacs containing astro-medical information as an almanac and not a calendar.

Growing demand for calendrical, astrological, and medical information among an expanding audience of medical practitioners and learners combined with the wider trend of the miniaturization of calendars contributed to the increased production of these folded almanacs over the late 14th and 15th centuries.

== Users ==
The use of folded almanacs by physicians is confirmed by their depictions in illuminated manuscripts where the almanac can be seen hanging at their belt. Previously it had been theorized that the physicians depicted in these manuscripts carried coin purses on their belts. The prevalence of these folded almanacs among medieval medical practitioners and the basic medical knowledge contained inside surviving folding almanacs indicates that while the astrological and medical tools within were devised by highly educated, probably university trained scholars, most users of folding almanacs had far less training and education.

In the medieval period, almanacs were owned by a large range of individuals, but it can be said that the large majority of owners and users of the folded almanac were medical practitioners.

== Examples ==
London, British Library, MS Harley 5311 is a surviving folded almanac from around 1406 written in Latin. It contains 10 folios which contain the following:

- Folio 1-1^{v} contains a mobile feast table used to calculate the dates of feasts on the calendar, a calendar canon, and the Vein Man.
- Folio 2-5^{v} contain a calendar divided into 3 sections that align with the folds. The left panel provides the length of half the night in hours and the altitude and angle of the sun at noon and moon at its prime beginning in 1387 and ending at 1406. The middle panel is a liturgical calendar, and the right panel provides the days of the month from 1 to 31, the planetary hours and shows the year in the Metonic cycle as well as providing the time of the lunar prime for the next two Metonic cycles in 1425 and 1444.
- Folio 6-6^{v} contain lunar tables and a canon that would allow the used to calculate the zodiac sign for any date.
- Folios 7-7^{v} provide the dates of solar eclipses for 1406-1462 and folios 8-9^{v} provide the dates of lunar eclipses for 1398-1462.
- Folio 9 contains a Sphere of Apuleius, a tool to determine the likelihood of a person’s survival and a urine table.
- Folio 10 contains a tract on astrological prediction used to predict weather.

Later additions to Harley 5311 expand some of the calendrical information up to 1520 as well as the addition of a Vein Man and Zodiac Man although the illustration was never completed.

London, British Library, MS Harley 937 written around 1430. This folded almanac differs from Harley 5311 in that it is written in the vernacular. It is also notable for adapting a condensed version of Chaucer’s Treatise on the Astrolabe.

- Folio 1 contains prefatory text,
- Folio 1-2^{v} contains more text on the use of calendars.
- Folios 3-6^{v} contain calendar tables.
- Folios 7-7^{v} contain text explaining the nature of planets and the zodiac.
- Folios 8-8^{v} and 8^{v}-10 contain lunar and solar eclipse diagrams respectively with
- Folio 10 containing deconstructed eclipse diagrams.

The lack of more typical folded almanac features such as the Vein Man and Zodiac Man is explained is explained by the emphasis Harley 937 places on the vernacular. The borrowing of text from Chaucer and the over explanatory nature of this almanac compared its Latin counterparts’ points to the almanac attempting to give the reader the tools to understand the content rather than having to decode the content.
