= Cyril Davenport =

British librarian, art historian, and bookbinding historian (1848–1941)

Cyril James Humphries Davenport (5 June 1848, Stirling – 15 January 1941, Taunton) was a British librarian, art historian, and designer.

== Life ==
Davenport, the son of an officer and the grandson of Admiral Salusbury Pryce Humphreys (Davenport), attended Charterhouse School. He initially worked as a draftsman for the Royal Engineer Department of the War Office before joining the British Museum Library (now part of the British Library) in 1868. During his tenure, he became Superintendent of Bookbinding. He retired in 1913.

Davenport was regarded as an authority on the history of bookbinding and published extensively on this and other art and cultural history topics. He was a Fellow of the Society of Antiquaries of London. Additionally, he was an artist, working as a watercolor and miniature painter, book cover designer, sculptor, enameler, and goldsmith.

== Bibliography ==
=== References ===
- "Davenport, Cyril James H.". Who's Who. Vol. 59 (49th ed.). London: Adam and Charles Black. 1907. p. 455. Retrieved March 30, 2025.
1. Via Internet Archive (Harvard).
2. Via Google Books (Harvard).
- Thieme, Ulrich, ed. (1918). "Davenport, Cyril James". Allgemeines Lexikon der bildenden Künstler von der Antike bis zur Gegenwar [General Encyclopedia of Visual Artists From Antiquity to the Present] (in German). Vol. 8: "Coutan—Delattre". p. 496.
1. Via Internet Archive (Harold B. Lee Library).
