= Saa paper =

Mainland Southeast Asian mulberry paper

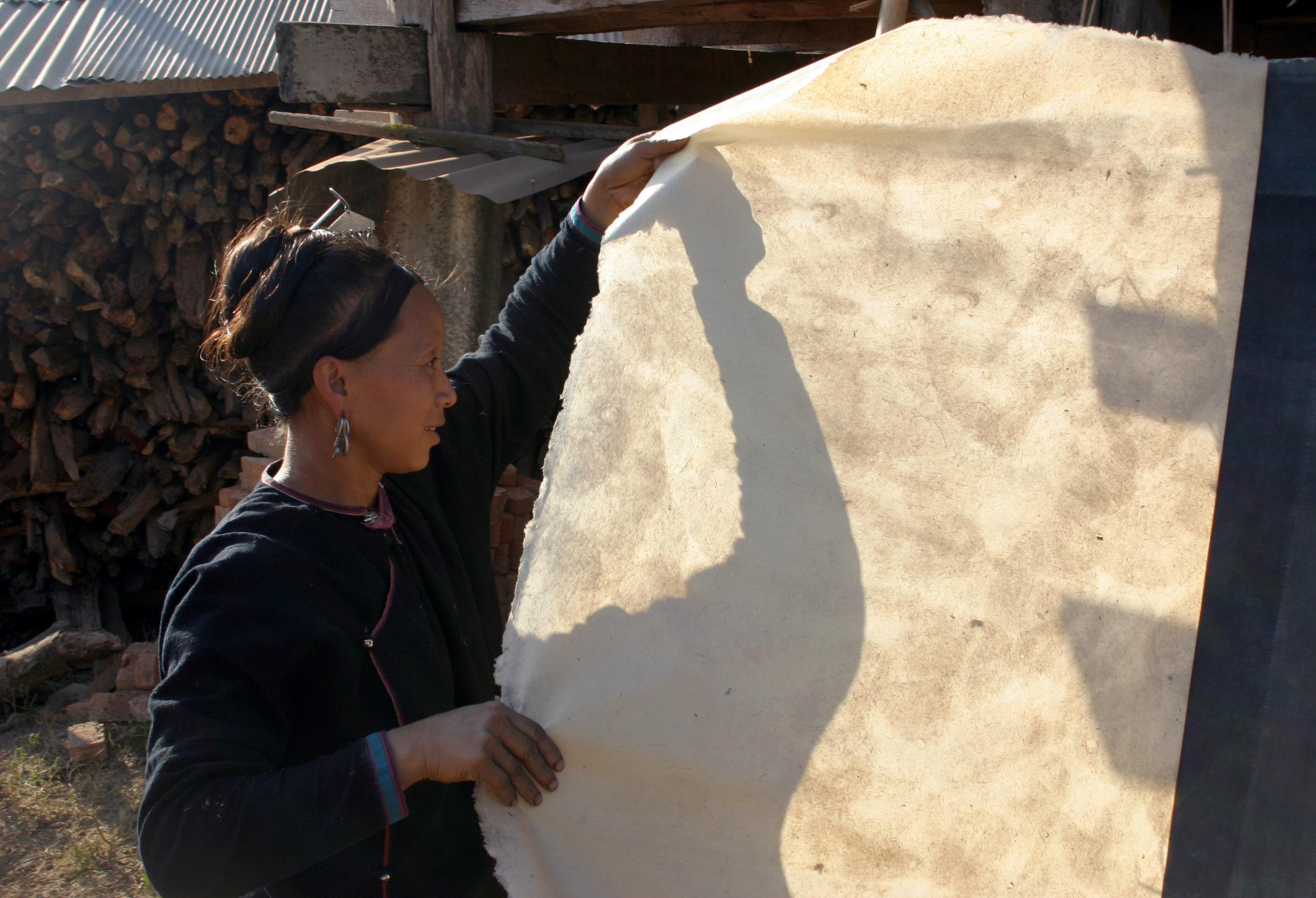
- Type: Mulberry paper
- Material: Paper mulberry bark
- Place of origin: Laos, Thailand

Saa paper (Note: a.k.a. sa paper or sá paper) (Thai: กระดาษสา, Lao: ເຈ້ຍສາ, Shan: ကြေစာ, ce-saa) is a Mainland Southeast Asia mulberry paper, made from the bark of the saa tree, (Note: Lao: posa or porsa) or paper mulberry. Saa paper is traditionally handmade but is now also machine-made.

== History ==
Saa paper was historically used as a wrapper for opium in the Golden Triangle.

=== Manuscripts ===
==== Laos ====
In Laos, saa paper is used in phap sa folding-book manuscripts, as well as phap hua traditionally bound books.

==== Myanmar ====
Saa paper was used for Shan manuscripts of Buddhist texts and folk literature up through the 20th century; traditional writing implements were a fern pen (kam-kut), and ink made of soot and animal bile.

== Production ==
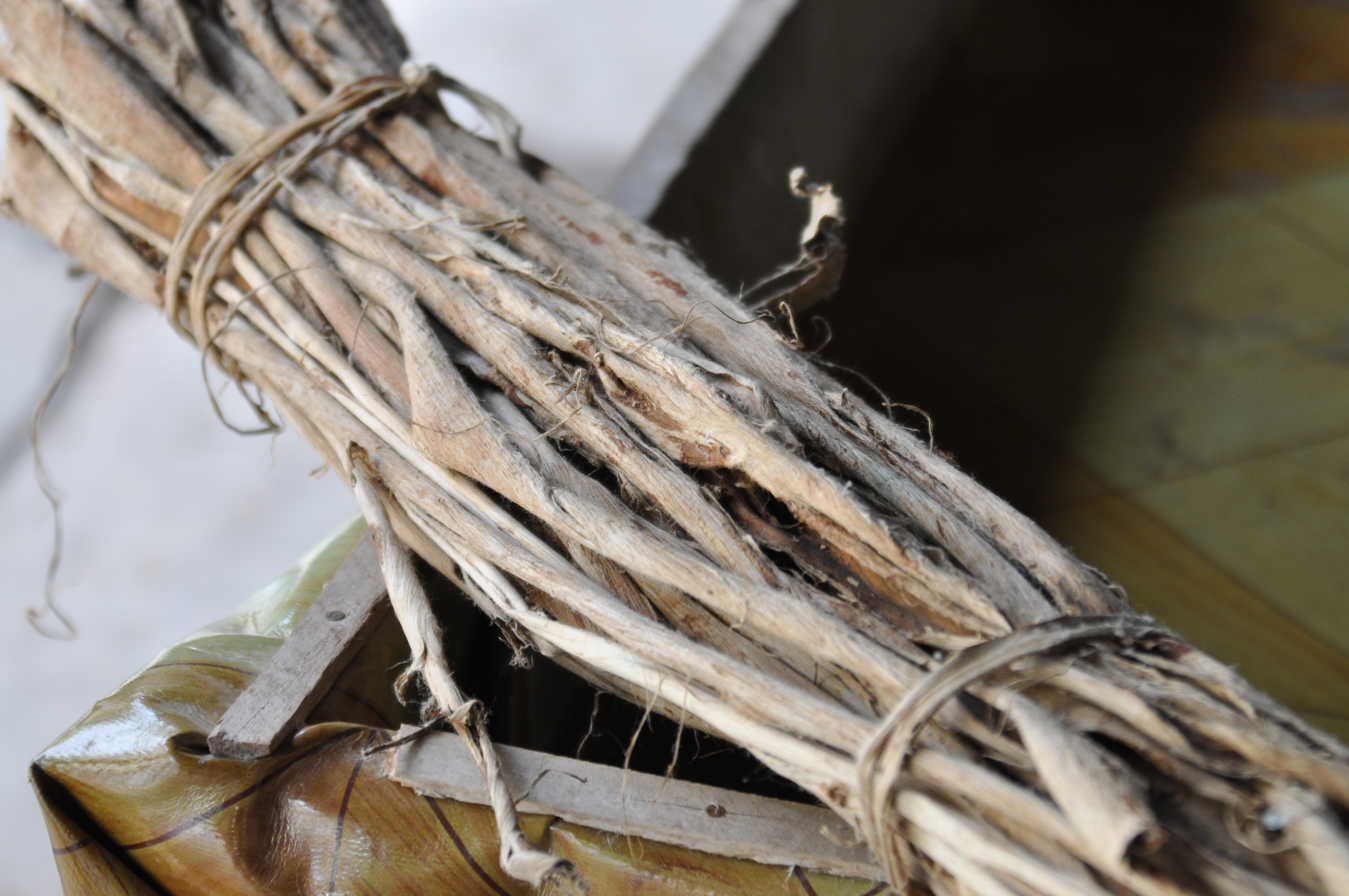
Mulberry bark before soaking

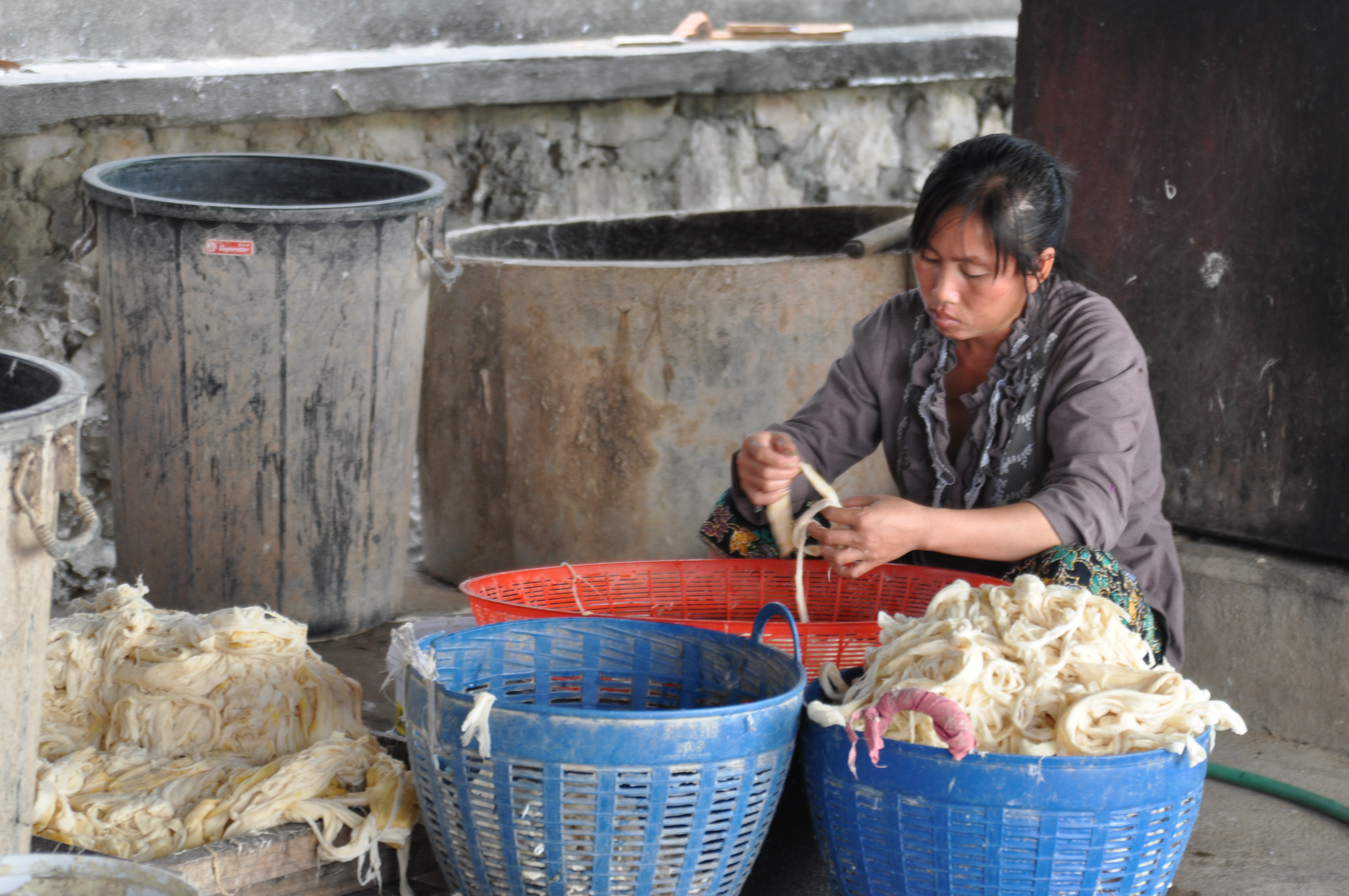
Soaked bark is shredded

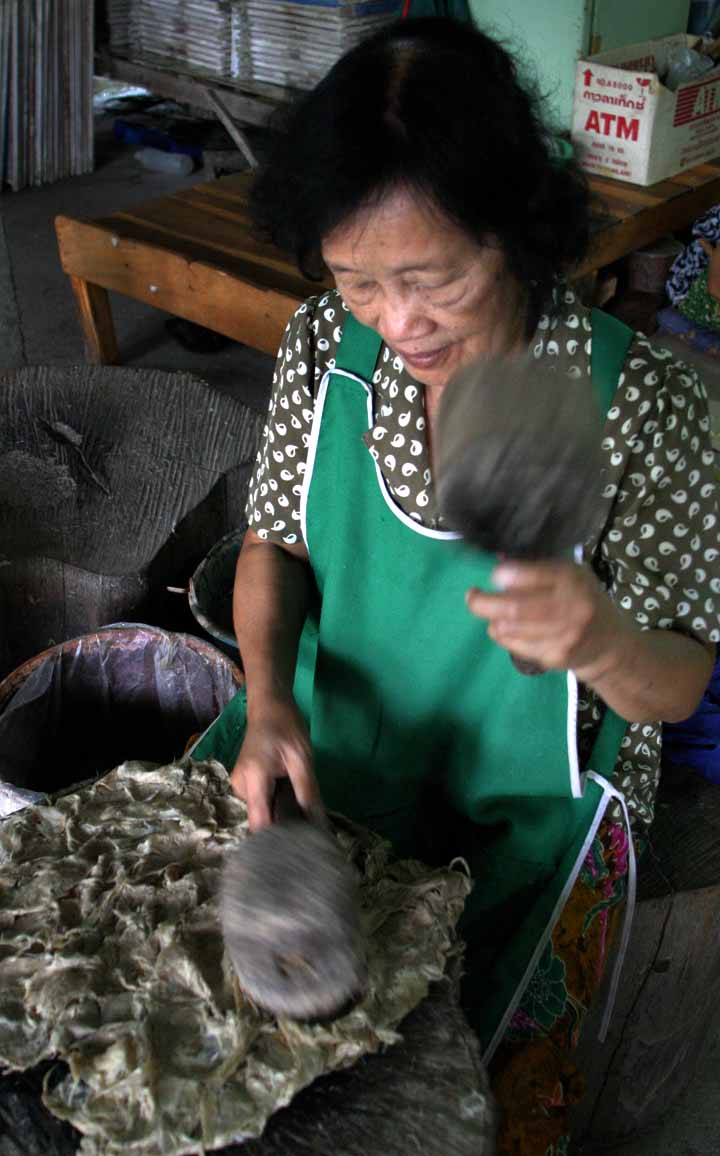
Pounding mulberry bark into pulp

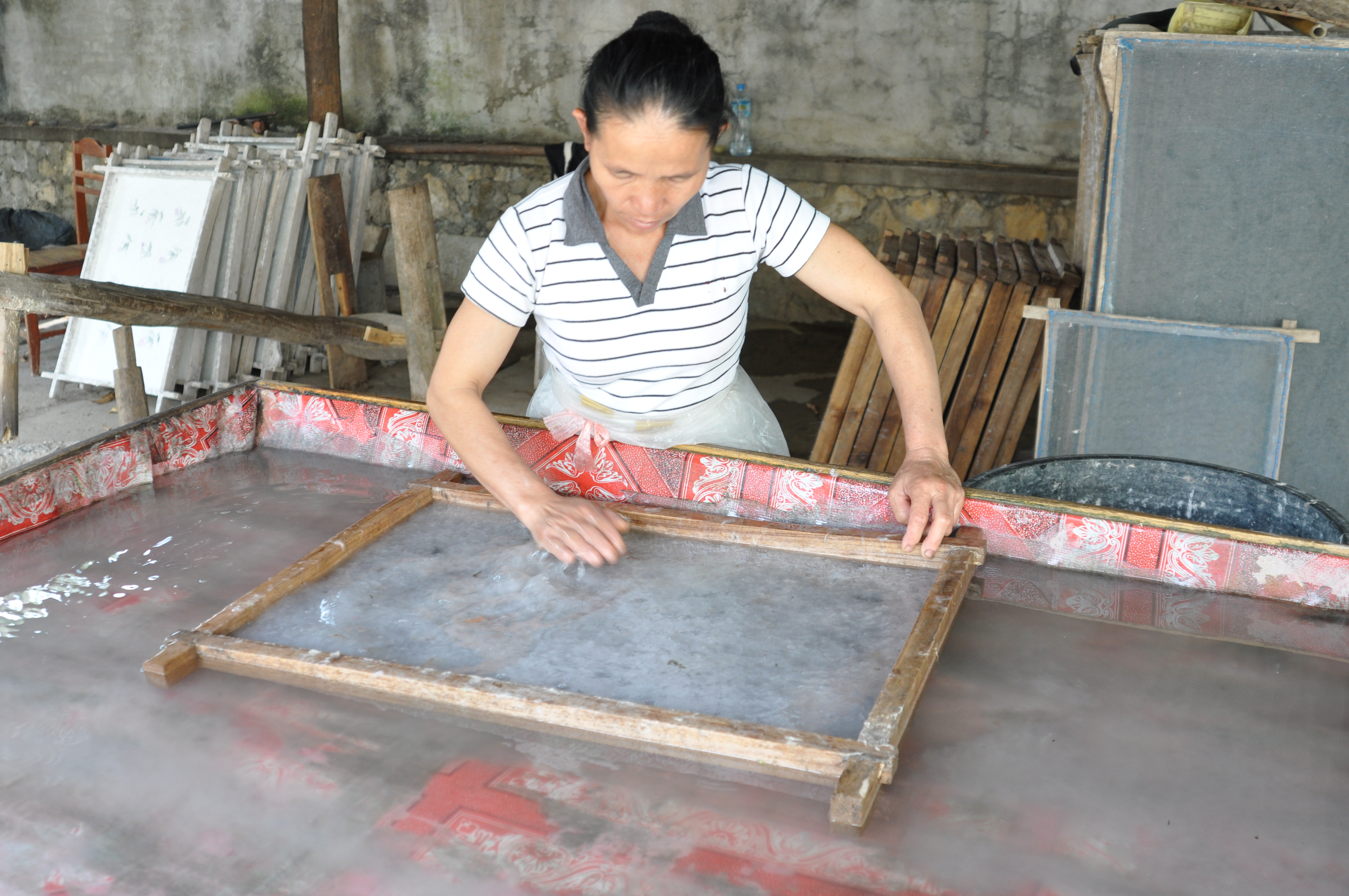
Slurry being screened and thinned out by hand

Production begins with branches of paper mulberry. The branches are dew-retted, soaked and steamed, then the bast fiber separated from the bark. The bast is treated in an alkaline solution, then pounded into a pulp. In handmade paper production, a deckle is used to screen the pulp slurry into single sheets.

The final paper is insect-resistant and remains durable for centuries.

Laos has become a major exporter of mulberry bark for industrial saa paper production in Thailand, ever since the Lao economic reforms of the late 1980s. As of 2012, between 80% and 95% of the mulberry bark used in the Thai saa paper industry was imported from Laos, primarily from the provinces Sainyabuli, Luang Prabang and Oudomxay; a further percentage came from Myanmar. Laotian bark farmers see returns as much as ten times higher from exporting their bark as opposed to supplying small local mills for the tourism industry.

A 2009 study of northern Laotian mulberry bark collecters found that 4.4% of those interviewed knew that the final product of the bark was saa paper.
