= Spadea =

A spadea or spadia (also "spadea fold") is a separately printed, unbound broadsheet that is folded around a newspaper or other periodical, or around one of its sections, appearing as a partial page or flap over the front and back.

Spadeas have been an advertising mechanism for publishers for many years, particularly for magazines and comics. They have become popular for other publishing forms as well; in 2007, The New York Times implemented a spadia ad campaign for the first time.

== See also ==
- gatefold
- obi (publishing)
