= Powell (surname) =

- Pronunciation: /ˈpaʊəl/ POW-əl /ˈpoʊəl/ POH-əl
- Language: English

Origin
- Language: Welsh
- Meaning: "son of Hywell"

Powell is a surname. It is a patronymic form of the Welsh name Hywel (later Anglicized as Howell), with the prefix ap meaning "son of", together forming ap Hywel, or "son of Hywel". It is a common name among those of Welsh ancestry. It originates in a dynasty of kings in Wales and Brittany in the 9th and 10th century, and three Welsh royal houses of that time onwards. The House of Tudor, one of the Royal houses of England, also descended from them.

== Deceased ==
- Adam Clayton Powell Sr. (1865–1953), minister of the Abyssinian Baptist Church in Harlem, New York
- Adam Clayton Powell Jr. (1908–1972), minister and politician, first African American to become a powerful figure in the United States Congress
- Alfred Hoare Powell (1865–1960), English Arts and Crafts architect, pottery decorator and artist
- Annie Powell (1906-1986) Welsh Communist politician
- Anthony Powell (1905–2000), English novelist
- Art Powell (wide receiver) (1937–2015), American football player, brother of Charlie Powell
- Arthur William Baden Powell (1901–1987), New Zealand malacologist and paleontologist
- Baden Powell (mathematician) (1796–1860), English mathematician; father of Robert Baden-Powell
- Bill Powell (1916–2009), American golf course designer
- Billy Powell (1952–2009), keyboardist of the American band Lynyrd Skynyrd
- Brian Powell (baseball player) (1973–2009), American baseball player
- Bud Powell (1924–1966), American jazz pianist and composer
- Caroline Amelia Powell (1852–1935), Irish-born American engraver and illustrator
- Cecil Frank Powell (1903–1969), British physicist and Nobel laureate in physics
- Charlie Powell (1932–2014), American football player, brother of Art Powell
- Colin Powell (1937–2021), United States Secretary of State, Chairman of the Joint Chiefs of Staff
- Cozy Powell (1947–1998), English drummer for the bands Black Sabbath, Rainbow, and Whitesnake
- Cynthia Lennon née Powell (1939–2015), British first wife of John Lennon
- Dawn Powell (1896–1965), American writer of satirical novels and stories
- Dick Powell (1904–1963), American singer, actor, producer, and director
- Dilys Powell (1901–1995), British journalist, author, and film critic
- E. Alexander Powell (1879–1957), American war correspondent and author
- Eileen Louisa Powell (1913–1997), Australian trade unionist and women's activist
- Eleanor Powell (1912–1982), American actress and dancer
- Elkan Harrison Powell (1888–1966), American publisher
- Enoch Powell (1912–1998), British politician
- Ernest Powell (1861–1928), English cricketer
- F. M. Powell (1848-1903), American physician
- Felix Powell (1878–1942), Welsh songwriter
- Francis Powell (priest) (1909–1998), dean of Belize
- Sir Francis Powell, 1st Baronet (1827–1911), English politician
- Frank Powell (1877–?), Canadian stage and silent film actor, screenwriter, and director
- Frank Powell (footballer) (1883–1946), English football manager
- Frank John Powell (1891–1971), British Liberal Party politician and magistrate
- Foster Powell (1734–1793) English long-distance walker
- Frederick Powell (1895–1992), British Royal Air Force pilot
- George Henry Powell (1880–1951), Welsh songwriter
- Gwyneth Powell (1946–2022), English actress
- Israel Wood Powell (1801–1852), Canadian politician in Ontario
- Israel Wood Powell (1836–1915), Canadian politician in British Columbia
- Ivor Powell (1916–2012), Welsh footballer
- Jackie Powell (1871–1955), South African rugby player
- Jaime Powell (1953–2016), Argentine paleontologist
- James Powell and Sons, English glassworkers
- Jane Powell (1929–2021), American actress, singer, and dancer
- Jay Powell (politician) (1952–2019), American lawyer and politician
- Jesse Powell (1971–2022), American R&B singer
- Jim Powell (British novelist) (1949–2023), British novelist
- Jody Powell (1943–2009), White House press secretary for Jimmy Carter
- John Wesley Powell (1834–1902), American soldier, geologist, and explorer of the American West
- Julie Powell (1973–2022), American food writer and memoirist
- Lange Powell (1886–1938), Australian architect and Freemason, designer of the Masonic Temple in Brisbane
- Lawrence Fitzroy Powell (1881–1975), British librarian and literary scholar
- Leslie Powell (1896–1961), British military officer and flying ace
- Leven Powell (1737–1810), American politician, soldier and planter
- Levin M. Powell (1798–1885), American naval officer
- Lewis Franklin Powell Jr. (1907–1998), Associate Justice of the Supreme Court of the United States
- Lewis Thornton Powell (1844–1865), Confederate soldier, hanged as a conspirator in the Lincoln assassination
- Lewis W. Powell (1882–1942), American politician and lawyer
- Mel Powell (1923–1998), American jazz pianist and composer
- Michael Powell (1905–1990), British film director
- Michael J. D. Powell (1936–2015), British mathematician
- Paul Powell (director) (1881–1944), American journalist, director, producer, screenwriter and actor
- Paul Warner Powell (1978–2010), American murderer convicted for the murder of Stacie Reed
- Philip Powell (architect) (1921–2003), British architect
- Ray Edwin Powell (1887–1973), Canadian businessman (founder of Alcan Aluminium) and educator (Chancellor of McGill University)
- Robert Baden-Powell, 1st Baron Baden-Powell (1857–1941), British Army lieutenant-general; founder of the world Scouting Movement
- Robert E. Powell (1923–1997), mayor of Monroe, Louisiana, 1979 to 1996
- Roger Powell (1896–1990), English bookbinder
- Ron Powell (1929–1992), Welsh goalkeeper who played for Chesterfield
- Sam Powell (footballer) (1899–1961), English footballer
- Sandy Powell (comedian) (1900–1982), English comedian best known for his radio work of the 1930s
- Seth Powell (1862–1945), Wales international footballer
- T. G. E. Powell (1916–1975), British archaeologist
- Theresa A. Powell (1952–2023), academic administrator
- Thomas Powell (botanist) (1809–1897), British missionary to Samoa and botanist
- Tommy Powell (Gaelic footballer) (1894–1964), Irish Gaelic footballer
- Tommy Powell (English footballer) (1925–1998), English footballer
- Tristram Powell (1940–2024), English television director, film director, writer and producer
- Vince Powell (1928–2009), British sitcom writer
- Wick Powell (1905–1973), Welsh international rugby union footballer
- Wickham Powell (1892–1961), Welsh international rugby union and rugby league footballer
- William Powell (1892–1984), American actor
- William G. Powell (1871–1955), Marine Corps Brevet Medal recipient

== Living ==
- Adam Powell (game designer) (born 1976), British co-founder of Neopets
- Adam Clayton Powell IV (born 1962), American politician
- Adam Powell (director)(born 1981), British Director
- Alex Powell (born 2007), Jamaican Driver in F4 Italian Championship
- Andrew Powell (born 1949), English music composer and performer
- Andy Powell (born 1950), English guitarist for rock band Wishbone Ash
- Andy Powell (rugby) (born 1981), Welsh rugby union internationalist
- Asafa Powell (born 1982), Jamaican athlete
- Barry Powell (footballer) (born 1954), English footballer
- Boog Powell (born 1941), popular nickname of John Wesley Powell, American baseball player (1961–77 in Major League Baseball)
- Boog Powell (outfielder) (born 1993), nickname of Herschel Mack Powell IV, American baseball player (not related to the above)
- Brian Powell (sociologist) (born 1954), American sociologist
- Catherine Powell (born 1967), British businesswoman
- Ceri Powell (born 1963), Welsh geologist and Royal Dutch Shell executive
- Chris Powell (born 1969), England international footballer and coach
- Charles Powell (born 1941), British diplomat and businessman, advisor to Margaret Thatcher and John Major
- Charles Powell (historian) (born 1960), British historian of Spain
- Claudette Monica Powell (born 1966), American nun and TikToker
- Cornell Powell (born 1997), American football player
- Dante Powell (comedian), American stand-up comedian
- Daren Powell (born 1978), West Indian cricketer
- Darren Powell (born 1976), English footballer
- Darren Powell (soccer coach) (born 1972), English football coach
- Darryl Powell (born 1971), Jamaican international footballer
- Daryl Powell (born 1965), English rugby league player and coach
- Dennis Powell (born 1963), American baseball pitcher
- Dina Powell (born 1974), American politician
- Don Powell (born 1946), drummer for English rock band Slade
- Drake Powell (born 2005), American basketball player
- Duke Powell, American paramedic and politician
- Eamon Powell (born 2002), American ice hockey player
- Emma Powell, South African politician
- Eric Powell (comics) (born 1975), American comic book artist and writer
- Ethan Powell (born 2011), British child actor and television presenter
- Frank Neff Powell (born 1947), Episcopal Bishop of Southwestern Virginia
- Glen Powell, American actor
- Holden Powell (born 1999), American baseball player
- Hope Powell (born 1966), English female footballer and manager
- James Powell (author) (born 1932), Canadian mystery writer
- Jay Powell (born 1972), American baseball pitcher
- Jenny Powell (born 1968), English television presenter
- Jerome Powell (born 1953), American attorney and investment banker, current Federal Reserve Chair
- Jim Powell (poet), American poet and translator
- Jim Powell (sportscaster), American sportscaster
- Joe Powell (American football) (born 1994), American football player
- Katie Ann Powell, American beauty pageant title winner
- Keith Powell (born c. 1979/1980), American TV actor
- Kieran Powell (born 1990), Nevisian cricketer
- Lamar Powell (born 1993), English footballer
- Laurene Powell Jobs née Powell (born 1963), American businesswoman
- Lydia Powell, American politician
- Lin Powell (born 1939), Australian politician
- Llŷr Powell (born 1995), Welsh politician
- Magnus Powell (born 1974), Swedish footballer
- Mark Allan Powell, American biblical scholar
- Marshawn Powell (born 1990), American basketball player
- Matt Powell (born 1978), Welsh rugby union footballer
- Mike Powell (athlete), American world record holder in the long jump
- Mishael Powell (born 2001), American football player
- Myles Powell (born 1997), American basketball player
- Nick Powell (born 1994), English footballer
- Nigel Powell (born 1971), English musician
- Norman Powell (born 1993), American basketball player
- Owen Powell (born 1988), American musician, Police Officer
- Peter Powell (DJ) (born 1951), British disc jockey on BBC Radio 1 in the 1970s and 1980s
- Renee Powell (born 1946), American professional golfer
- Ricardo Powell (born 1978), Jamaican cricketer
- Robert Powell (born 1944), British actor
- Robert Powell (composer) (born 1932), American composer
- Ronald Powell (born 1991), American football player
- Rovman Powell (born 1993), Jamaica and West Indies cricket player
- Russell Powell (born 1954), American musician
- Sandy Powell (costume designer) (born 1960), British costume designer who has been nominated nine times for the academy
- Sara Jordan Powell (born 1938), American gospel musician
- Shawn Powell (American football) (born 1988), American football player
- ShunDerrick Powell (born 2002), American football player
- Sidney Katherine Powell (born 1955), American attorney and federal prosecutor
- Steve Powell (born 1951), English footballer
- Sylvester Earl Powell (born 1972), American songwriter and music producer
- Tyreem Powell (born 2001), American football player
- Walter W. Powell (born 1951), American sociologist
- Wendy Powell (born 1971), American voice actor
- William Powell (Liberal Democrat politician) (born 1950), Welsh politician

== Fictional characters ==
- Colleen Powell, in the Australian TV series Prisoner
- Milo Powell, the title character in the Canadian-Filipino animated series Captain Flamingo
- Herbert 'Herb' Powell, Homer Simpson's half-brother on The Simpsons
- Powell, various family members on No Ordinary Family television series
- Sergeant Al Powell, in the 1988 film Die Hard
- Tyler Powell, in The Hallmarked Man, Robert Galbraith, 2025
- Denim Powell, playable character of Tactics Ogre.

== Lists of people by title ==
- Colonel Powell (disambiguation)
- General Powell (disambiguation)
- Governor Powell (disambiguation)
- Justice Powell (disambiguation) or Judge Powell
- Major Powell (disambiguation)
- Secretary Powell (disambiguation)
- Senator Powell (disambiguation)

== Lists of people with the name ==
- Adam Powell (disambiguation)
- Alan Powell (disambiguation)
- Albert Powell (disambiguation)
- Alfred Powell (disambiguation)
- Andrew Powell (disambiguation)
- Anthony Powell (disambiguation)
- Art Powell (disambiguation)
- Arthur Powell (disambiguation)
- Aubrey Powell (disambiguation)
- Ben Powell (disambiguation)
- Brian Powell (disambiguation)
- Caroline Powell (disambiguation)
- Charles Powell (disambiguation)
- Chris Powell (disambiguation)
- Colin Powell (disambiguation)
- Craig Powell (disambiguation)
- David Powell (disambiguation)
- Doug Powell (disambiguation)
- Drew Powell (disambiguation)
- Edward Powell (disambiguation)
- Elizabeth Powell (disambiguation)
- Ellis Powell (disambiguation)
- Eric Powell (disambiguation)
- Francis Powell (disambiguation)
- Frank Powell (disambiguation)
- Gary Powell (disambiguation)
- George Powell (disambiguation)
- Gregory Powell (disambiguation)
- Harold Powell (disambiguation)
- Harry Powell (disambiguation)
- Henry Powell (disambiguation)
- Herbert Powell (disambiguation)
- Ian Powell (disambiguation)
- Jack Powell (disambiguation)
- James Powell (disambiguation)
- Jay Powell (disambiguation)
- Jeff Powell (disambiguation)
- John Powell (disambiguation)
- Jonathan Powell (disambiguation)
- Joseph Powell (disambiguation)
- Kenneth Powell (disambiguation)
- Lance Powell (disambiguation)
- Larry Powell (disambiguation)
- Lee Powell (disambiguation)
- Les Powell (disambiguation)
- Lewis Powell (disambiguation)
- Mark Powell (disambiguation)
- Mary Powell (disambiguation)
- Matthew Powell (disambiguation)
- Michael Powell (disambiguation)
- Nick Powell (disambiguation)
- Oliver Powell (disambiguation)
- Paul Powell (disambiguation)
- Peter Powell (disambiguation)
- Philip Powell (disambiguation)
- Ray Powell (disambiguation)
- Randy Powell (disambiguation)
- Richard Powell (disambiguation)
- Robert Powell (disambiguation)
- Roger Powell (disambiguation)
- Ronald Powell (disambiguation)
- Roy Powell (disambiguation)
- Russell Powell (disambiguation)
- Ryan Powell (disambiguation)
- Samuel Powell (disambiguation)
- Sandy Powell (disambiguation)
- Simon Powell (disambiguation)
- Susan Powell (disambiguation)
- Thomas Powell (disambiguation)
- Tony Powell (disambiguation)
- Walter Powell (disambiguation)
- William Powell (disambiguation)

== See also ==
- Powell baronets, several baronetcies
- Powell (given name)
- Baden Powell (surname)
- Powell (disambiguation)
- Powells (disambiguation)
- Powel (disambiguation)
- Powdrell
- Howell (surname)
- Welsh surnames
