= Powell =

Powell may refer to:

== People ==
- Powell (surname)
- Powell (given name)
- Powell baronets, several baronetcies
- Colonel Powell (disambiguation), several military officers
- General Powell (disambiguation), several military leaders
- Governor Powell (disambiguation), several governors
- Justice Powell (disambiguation), several judges
- Major Powell (disambiguation), several military officers
- Secretary Powell (disambiguation), several officials
- Senator Powell (disambiguation), several senators

== Places ==
- Powell Butte (disambiguation), several hills
- Powell County (disambiguation), several counties
- Powell Creek (disambiguation), several watercourses
- Mount Powell (disambiguation) or Powell Mountain, several mountains
- Powell River (disambiguation), several watercourses
- Powell Township (disambiguation), several townships

=== Antarctica ===
- Powell Island, South Orkney Islands

=== Maldives ===
- Powell Islands, Raa Atoll, Maldives

=== United States ===
- Powell, Alabama, a town in DeKalb County
- Powell, Missouri, an unincorporated community in McDonald County
- Powell, Cass County, Missouri, a ghost town
- Powell, Nebraska, an unincorporated community
- Powell, Ohio, a city in Delaware County
- Powell, Edmunds County, South Dakota, an unincorporated community
- Powell, Haakon County, South Dakota, a ghost town
- Powell, Tennessee, an unincorporated community in Knox County
- Powell, Texas, a town in Navarro County
- Powell, Wisconsin, an unincorporated community
- Powell, Wyoming, a city in Park County
- Lake Powell, a man-made reservoir on the Colorado River

=== Solar System ===
- Powell (crater), a crater in Taurus–Littrow valley on the Moon

== Facilities and structures ==
- Powell Hall, home of the Saint Louis Symphony Orchestra in St. Louis, Missouri
- Powell Observatory, Louisburg, Kansas
- Powell Gardens, Kansas City, Missouri
- Powell House (disambiguation), several buildings
- Powell High School (disambiguation), several schools
- Powell Middle School (disambiguation), several schools
- Powell Street station, train station in San Francisco, California

== Companies ==
- Powell's Books, a chain of bookstores in the U.S. state of Oregon
- Powell Manufacturing Company, a defunct American motor vehicle company
- Powell Peralta or Powell Corporation, a skateboard company

== Other uses ==
- Powell v. Alabama, a 1932 U.S. Supreme Court case regarding capital punishment and due process
- Powell v. McCormack, a 1969 U.S. Supreme Court case regarding seating of a member of the House of Representatives
- Powell Doctrine, a use of military force doctrine
- Powell's method, an algorithm for finding the minimum of a non-differentiable function

== See also ==
- Powel (disambiguation)
- Powells (disambiguation)
- Baden Powell (disambiguation)
