= David Powell =

David Powell may refer to:

- Dai Powell (David Morgan Powell, born 1935), Welsh footballer, full back for Blackpool and Rochdale
- Dave Powell (1876–1953), Australian rules footballer who played with South Melbourne
- David Powell (actor) (1883–1925), Scottish-born stage and film actor of the silent era
- David Powell (aerospace engineer), American aerospace engineer
- David Powell (footballer, born 1944) (1944–2023), Welsh footballer
- David Powell (footballer, born 1967), English former footballer
- David Powell (rugby union) (born 1942), former England international rugby union player
- David Powell (table tennis) (born 1991), Australian table tennis player
- David Franklin Powell ("White Beaver") (1847–1906), showman, patent-medicine maker and Wisconsin politician
- David Thomas Powell (c. 1772–1848), English clergyman and antiquary
- Dewi Nantbrân (David Powell, died 1781), Welsh Franciscan

== See also ==
- David Powel (1549/52–1598), Welsh Church of England clergyman and historian
