= John William Powell =

John William Powell may refer to:

- John W. Powell, American journalist in China
- John William Powell (politician), member of the Mississippi State Senate

== See also ==
- John Powell (disambiguation)
