= John Powell =

John Powell may refer to:

== Politics and law ==
- John Powell (MP for Cardigan) (died 1590s), MP for Cardigan
- John Powell (1645–1713), English Member of Parliament for Gloucester, 1685–1689
- John Joseph Powell (1816–1891), British Member of Parliament for Gloucester, 1862–1865
- John Enoch Powell (1912–1998), British politician
- John Powell (Canadian politician) (1809–1881), mayor of Toronto
- John A.H. Powell (died 1843), political figure in upper Canada
- John Powell (judge) (c. 1633 – 1696), Welsh judge
- John Blake Powell (1870–1923), Irish judge
- John William Powell (politician) (1928–2010), American politician

== Sports ==
- John Powell (footballer, born 1892) (1892–1961), English footballer
- John Powell (footballer, born 1936) (1936–2017), English semi-professional footballer
- John Powell (Australian footballer) (born 1937), Australian footballer for Collingwood and Fitzroy
- John Powell (weightlifter) (1931–2008), Australian Olympic weightlifter
- Jackie Powell (1871–1955), South African rugby union player
- John Powell (cricketer) (1904–1959), New Zealand cricketer
- John Powell (discus thrower) (1947–2022), American discus thrower
- Jack Powell (runner) (1910–1982), English athlete

== Others ==
- John Powell (painter), British painter
- Joseph Powell (painter) (1780–1833), English artist and teacher, sometimes called "John Powell"
- John Wesley Powell (1834–1902), American geologist and explorer
- John Powell (musician) (1882–1963), American pianist, composer, and eugenicist who promoted white separatist ideologies
- John Powell (film composer) (born 1963), British composer
- John Powell (physicist) (1923–1996), British physicist, creator of the EMI brain scanner
- John W. Powell (1919–2008), American publisher of China Weekly Review, tried for sedition in 1956
- john a. powell (who does not capitalize his name) (born 1947), American academic
- John Powell (Jesuit) (1925–2009), American priest and author
- John Frederick Powell (1915–2008), Royal Air Force officer
- John Hare Powel (1786–1856), American agriculturist

== See also ==
- Jack Powell (disambiguation)
