= Sergeant Powell =

Sergeant Powell may refer to:

== People ==
- Sergeant-Major Powell (16th century), a participant in the Battle of Santo Domingo (1586)
- Alvy Powell (born 1955), U.S. Army Chorus master sergeant and musician
- Felix Powell (1878–1942), Welsh musician and British Army staff sergeant
- Lee Powell (actor) (1908–1944), WWII U.S. Marine Corps sergeant, and film actor
- Ray Powell (police officer), British police sergeant of the South Yorkshire Police Service

== Fictional characters ==
- Al Powell, a fictional police desk sergeant from the 1988 U.S. action film Die Hard
- Detective Sergeant Powell, a fictional character from the 1984 British slasher film Don't Open till Christmas
- Sergeant Powell, a fictional character from the 2014 U.S. horror-comedy film Asylum (2014 film)

== See also ==
- Powell (disambiguation)
- Sergeant (disambiguation)
