= Major Powell (disambiguation) =

John Wesley Powell (1834–1902) was an American geologist and geographer.

Major Powell may also refer to:

== People ==
- E. Alexander Powell (1879–1957), U.S. military war correspondent, journalist and author
- Geoffrey Powell (20th century), British Army major, World War II commander of 156 Para battalion of 4th Parachute Brigade (United Kingdom)
- Vernon Harcourt De Butts Powell (died 1918), World War I Canadian major, recipient of the Military Cross for gallantry under fire, namesake of Powell's House at Appleby College

== Other uses ==
- Major Powell (steamboat), a 19th-century Colorado River screw-driven steam-powered riverboat named for John Wesley Powell

== See also ==
- Percy Powell-Cotton (1866–1980), British Army major and explorer
- Sergeant-Major Powell, a participant in the Battle of Santo Domingo (1586)
- Colonel Powell (disambiguation), several colonels who likely rose through the rank of major
- General Powell (disambiguation), several generals who likely rose through the rank of major
- Powell (disambiguation)
- Major (disambiguation)
