= Richard Powell =

Richard Powell may refer to:

- Dick Powell (1904–1963), American singer, actor, producer, and director
- Dick Powell (American football) (1904–1986), American football player
- Dick Powell, British violinist who played on Rod Stewart's Gasoline Alley
- Richard P. Powell (1908–1999), American author
- Richard M. Powell (screenwriter) (1916–1996), American screenwriter
- Richard M. Powell (investor) (born 1979), Jamaican investor
- Richard Powell (rugby union) (1864–1944), Welsh rugby union player
- Richard Powell (athlete) (born c. 1971), known as Richie, British wheelchair athlete
- Richard Powell (rower) (born 1960), Australian Olympic rower
- Richie Powell (1931–1956), American jazz pianist
- Richard C. Powell (born 1939), president of the Optical Society of America in 2000
- Sir Richard Powell, 1st Baronet (1842–1925), British physician
- Sir Richard Powell (civil servant), English civil servant
- Richard Powell (canoeist), American slalom canoeist in 2013 Canoe Slalom World Cup
