= James Powell =

James Powell (or Jim or Jimmy) may refer to:

== Sports ==
- Jay Powell (baseball) (James Willard Powell, born 1972), Major League Baseball pitcher
- Jim Powell (baseball) (1859–1929), Major League Baseball player
- Jim Powell (sportscaster), announcer for the Milwaukee Brewers and Atlanta Braves
- Jimmy Powell (golfer) (1935–2021), PGA Tour and Champions Tour golfer
- James Powell (cricketer, born 1792) (1792–1870), English cricketer
- James Powell (cricketer, born 1899) (1899–1973), English cricketer
- James Powell (cricketer, born 1982), Welsh cricketer

== Music ==
- Jimmy Powell (musician) (1914–1994), American jazz saxophonist
- Jimmy Powell (singer) (1942–2016), British rhythm and blues singer

== Science ==
- James L. Powell (born 1936), American geologist and environmentalist
- James R. Powell (physicist), American physicist

== Fiction and poetry ==
- Jim Powell (British novelist) (1949–2023)
- Jim Powell (poet), American poet, translator, literary critic, MacArthur Fellow, classicist
- James Powell (author) (born 1932), author of mystery and humorous short stories

== Other ==
- James Powell and Sons, British stained glass manufacturers
- James Powell (1774–1840), British glassmaker, founder of James Powell and Sons
- Jim Powell (filmmaker), American documentary filmmaker
- Jim Powell (historian), fellow at libertarian think tank the Cato Institute
- James R. Powell (politician), founder of the city of Birmingham, Alabama, mayor and state politician
- James Powell, African American teenager whose shooting led to the Harlem riot of 1964
