= Lewis Powell =

Lewis Powell may refer to:

- Lewis F. Powell Jr. (1907–1998), Associate Justice of the Supreme Court of the United States
- Lewis Powell (conspirator) (1844–1865), conspirator with John Wilkes Booth
- Lewis Powell (MP) (1576–1636), Welsh politician
- Lewis W. Powell (1882–1942), American lawyer and politician

== See also ==
- Louis Powell (1902–1995), cricket player
