= Powell (given name) =

Powell is a male given name.

It may refer to:

- Powell S. Barnett (1883–1971) U.S. musician and civil rights activist
- Powell F. Carter Jr. (1931–2017) U.S. Navy admiral
- Powell Clayton (1833–1914) U.S. soldier, politician, businessman
- Powel Crosley Jr. (1886–1961) U.S. entrepreneur
- Powell Lindsay (1905–1987) U.S. actor
- Powell Lloyd (1900–1987) UK opera singer
- Powell A. Moore (1938–2018) U.S. federal public servant
- Powell St. John (1940–2021) U.S. singer-songwriter
- Powell Smythe U.S. politician
- Powell Weaver (1890–1951) U.S. musician

== See also ==
- Powell (surname)
- Powell (disambiguation)
