= Richard Proulx =

American composer and musician

Richard Proulx (AmEng [pɺu]) (April 3, 1937, St. Paul, Minnesota — February 18, 2010, Chicago, Illinois) was an American composer and editor of church music, including anthems, service music, hymn concertatos, organ music and music for handbell choir, formerly based in Chicago. The pronunciation of his name is suggested by the section of his catalog entitled "Noulx [new] from Proulx".

== Biography ==
He served as a consultant on several important hymnals, including The Hymnal 1982 of the Episcopal Church (United States), the United Methodist Hymnal and the Roman Catholic hymnals Worship II (1975) and Worship III (1986). He had a long association with Holy Name Cathedral, Chicago, and has made several recordings with The Cathedral Singers, a professional chorus which he founded in 1991. His anthem We Adore You, O Christ received the Raabe Prize for Excellence in Sacred Composition, endowed for the Association of Lutheran Church Musicians by William and Nancy Raabe.

He died in Chicago, Illinois, aged 72, from undisclosed causes.

== See also ==
- Contemporary Catholic liturgical music
