= Thomas Powell =

Thomas, Tom or Tommy Powell may refer to:

== Clergy ==
- Thomas Powell (archdeacon of Worcester), 16th-century English priest
- Thomas Powell (rector of Cantref) (c. 1608 – 1660), Welsh Anglican priest and writer
- Thomas Powell (archdeacon of Port Elizabeth) (fl. 1926–1964), Anglican priest in South Africa

== Politics ==
- Sir Thomas Powell, 1st Baronet (1665–1720), Welsh politician
- Thomas Powell (Cardiganshire MP) (c. 1701–1752), Welsh politician
- Thomas Powell (Irish politician) (1892–1971), Irish Fianna Fáil politician

== Sports ==
- Tommy Powell (Gaelic footballer) (1894–1964), Irish Gaelic footballer
- Tosh Powell (Thomas Morgan Powell, 1908–1928), Welsh bantamweight boxer
- Tommy Powell (English footballer) (1925–1998), English association footballer
- Thomas Powell (ice hockey) (born 1986), Australian ice hockey player in the 2010 IIHF World Championship Division II
- Thomas Powell (Canadian soccer) (born 2001), Canadian soccer player
- Tom Powell (Australian footballer) (born 2002), Australian rules footballer

== Other people ==
- Thomas Powell (American landowner) (1641–1722), Quaker who secured the Bethpage Purchase on Long Island
- Thomas Powell (mine owner) (1779–1863), Welsh mine owner
- Thomas Powell (botanist) (1809–1887), British missionary to the Samoan Islands, taxon authority, paleontologist, and botanist
- Thomas Powell (writer) (1809–1887), English writer and fraudster
- Thomas Wilde Powell (1818–1897), English solicitor and stockbroker, patron of architects and artists
- Thomas C. Powell (1865–1945), American railroad executive
- Thomas Reed Powell (1880–1955), American legal scholar and political scientist
- T. G. E. Powell (Thomas George Eyre Powell, 1916–1975), British archaeologist

== Other uses ==
- Thomas Powell (steamboat), a steamboat built in 1846 for service on the Hudson River, New York

== See also ==
- Thomas Powel (1845–1922), Welsh professor of Celtic
- Thomas Douglas-Powell (born 1992), Australian volleyball player
