= Colin Powell (disambiguation) =

Colin Powell (1937–2021) was the U.S. Secretary of State and Chairman of the Joint Chiefs of Staff of the U.S. military.

Colin Powell may also refer to:

== People ==
- Colin Powell (economist) (1937–2019), British economist, and influential Jersey financier
- Colin Powell (footballer) (born 1948), British soccer player

== Education ==
- Colin Powell School for Civic and Global Leadership, CCNY, West Harlem, NYC, NYS, USA
- Colin Powell Leadership Academy (K-12), Dayton, Ohio, USA
- Colin Powell Center for Leadership & Ethics, Hargrave Military Academy, Chatham, Virginia, USA
- Colin Powell Middle School (Matteson), Elementary School District 159, Illinois, USA
- Colin Powell School (K-8), Long Beach Unified School District, North Long Beach, Long Beach, California, USA

== See also ==
- General Powell (disambiguation)
