= Yram =

Marcel Forhan
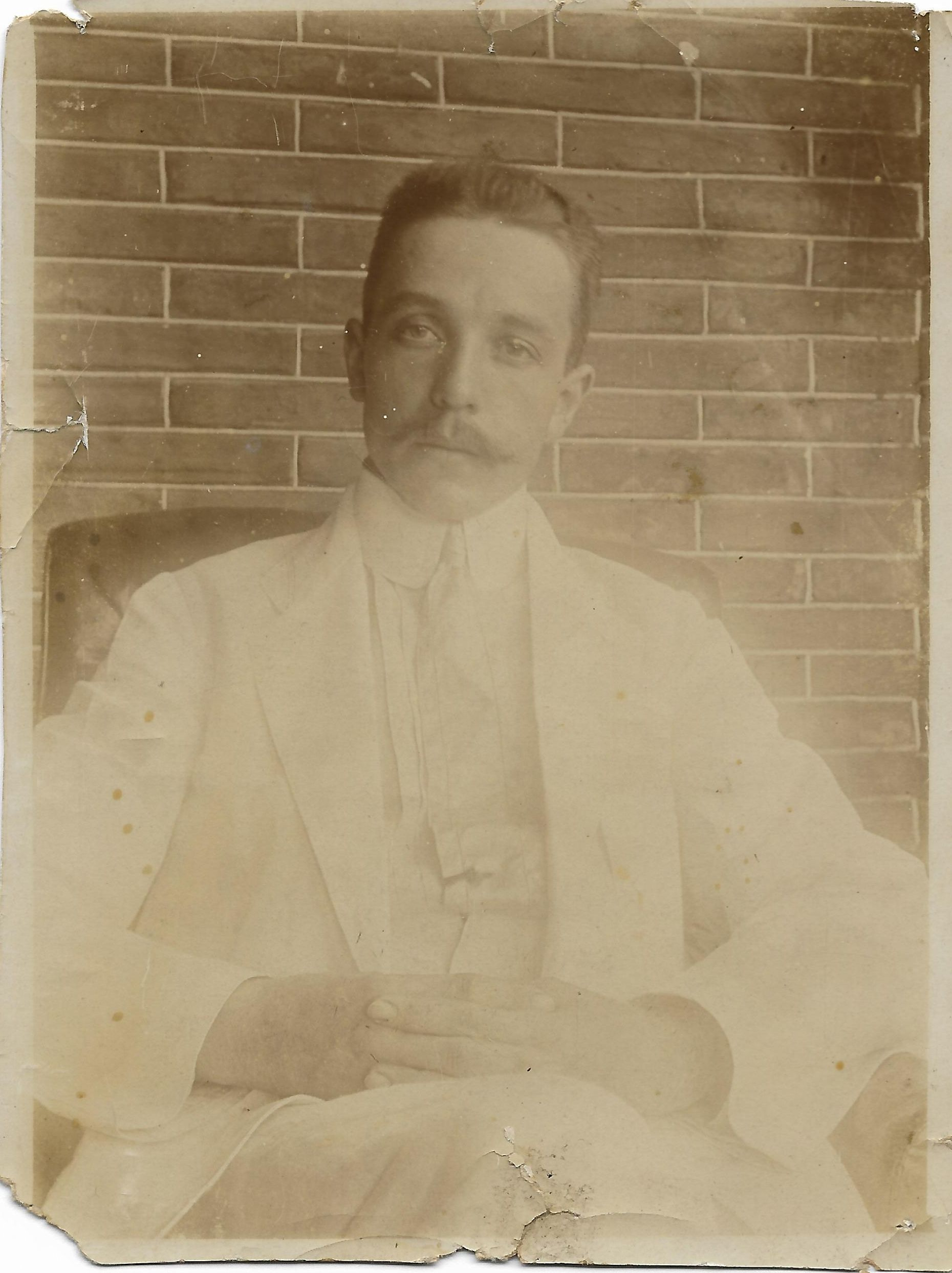
- Forhan in 1913

Marcel Louis Forhan (alias Yram) (November 1884 – 1 October 1927) was a French electrical engineer who specialized in the electrical installations of trams and Wireless (TSF) stations. He was also an occult writer, and wrote a metaphysical trilogy published in many countries.

== Early life ==
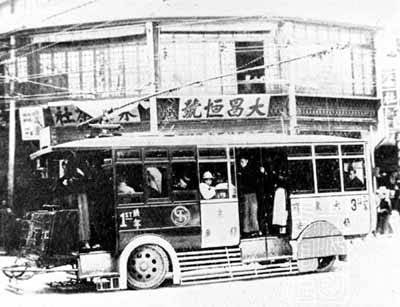
A trolleybus in Shanghai (pictured in 1920). Forhan built the power stations which powered such trams.

Marcel Louis Forhan was born on November 17, 1884, in Corbeil-Essonnes, France, the son of Louis Forhan and Céline Berthelot. He had a brother, Julien, and two sisters, Marcelline and Léa.

== Career ==
He worked as an electrical engineer for the French company of tramways and electric lighting. Shortly before the first world war, the company sent him to the French concession in Shanghai. There he designed the power station which supplied the French-build trams with electricity.

He also participated in the installation of wireless Broadcasting stations.

== Occultism ==
His books related out-of-body experiences using astral projection. He described a new paradigm, perhaps utopian, capable of creating a more equitable society which would not fear death and would act in a philanthropic way.

Some of its themes are common (but not specific) to Theosophy (the notion of karma, astral body, successive higher planes and spiritual evolution) and to authors such as Arthur Edward Powell.

== Personal life and death ==
His fiancée, Suzanne Garbe (born February 4, 1892, Guise), joined him in China from Egypt where she lived with her mother. They married on August 17, 1914, in Shanghai. In China, they had three children, Max (born in 1915), Marcel-André (born in 1919) and Robert (born in 1920).

In 1927, he contracted dysentery which developed into sepsis. Forhan died on October 1, 1927, in Shanghai.

== Published works ==
- Love each other (volume 1) published by Adyar, 1925
- The doctor of the soul (volume 2) published by Adyar, 1925 (later republished)
- Evolution in the Superior Worlds (volume 3) published by Adyar, 1926, published by GVP, 2000, ISBN 2-914303-11-4
- From dream to action (unpublished book, its notebooks having been lost)
- Practical astral projection, Kessinger Publishing co / Samuel Weiser Inc., New York
- Amaos los unos a los otros – Análisis y síntesis del amor universal, Colección Horus Mayor, Kier, 1959, 158 p.
- El Medico del alma, Colección Horus Mayor, Kier, 1959, ISBN 950-17-0321-5
- La Evolución de los Mundos Superiores, Colección Horus Mayor, Kier, 1959, 190 p. (Argentina)
- Secretele Lumilor Astrale, Editura Shambala, 1998 (Romania)
