= Robert Powell (disambiguation) =

Robert Powell (born 1944) is an English actor.

Robert Powell or variants may also refer to:

- Robert Powell (composer) (1932–2025), American organist and composer
- Robert Powell (cricketer) (born 1979), English cricketer
- Robert Powell (footballer) (born 1976), Australian rules footballer
- Robert Powell (racing driver) (born 1965), American racing driver
- Robert Powell (tennis) (1881–1917), also known as Bobby, Canadian tennis player
- Robert Powell (herpetologist) (born 1948), American herpetologist
- Robert Powell (priest) (died 1683), Anglican priest
- Robert Powel[l], puppeteer, alias of Martin Powell
- Robert E. Powell (1923–1997), mayor of Monroe, Louisiana, 1979–1996
- Robert Baden-Powell, 1st Baron Baden-Powell (1857–1941), founder of Scouting movement
- Robert Baden Powell (politician) (1901–1976), Canadian politician
- Robert Andrew Powell, American journalist and author
- Robert L. Powell (1956–2021), American political scientist
- Robert Powell III, American stand-up comedian and political satirist
- Bob Powell (baseball) (Robert Leroy Powell, 1933–2014), American baseball player
- Rob Powell (born 1980), rugby league coach
- Rob Powell (athlete), American athlete and fitness coach
- Bob Powell (1916–1967), comic book artist
- Bob Powell (cricketer) (1902–1976), New Zealand cricketer
- Bobby Powell (politician) (born 1981), member of the Florida Senate
- Bobby Powell (musician) (born 1943), Louisiana blues pianist
- Longie Powell (Robert V. Powell, 1919–1969), American basketball player
