= Mount Powell =

Mount Powell may refer to one of the following:

- One of several mountain peaks in the United States:
  - Mount Powell (California)
  - Mount Powell (Colorado) - highest summit of the Gore Range
  - Mount Powell (Granite County, Montana) - highest summit of the Flint Creek Range
  - Mount Powell (Powell County, Montana) in Powell County, Montana
  - Mount Powell (New Mexico)
  - Mount Powell (Utah)
- A mountain in Antarctica:
  - Mount Powell (Antarctica)

== See also ==
- Powell Mountain, a mountain ridge of the Appalachian Mountains, North America
- Powell Mountain (Mineral County, Nevada), a summit in the U.S. state of Nevada
- Mount Baden-Powell, San Gabriel Mountains, California, USA; a mountain
- Powell Butte (disambiguation)
- Powell (disambiguation)
