= Adam Powell =

Adam Powell may refer to:

- Adam Powell (rugby union) (born 1987), English rugby player
- Adam Powell (game designer) (born 1976), one of the founders of Neopets
- Adam Powell (cricketer) (1912–1982), English cricketer
- Adam Powell (English politician) (died 1546), MP for Gloucester
- Adam Powell (director) (born 1981)

== Adam Clayton Powell ==
Adam Clayton Powell may refer to:

=== People ===
- Adam Clayton Powell Sr. (1865–1953), pastor
- Adam Clayton Powell Jr. (1908–1972), politician and civil rights leader
- Adam Clayton Powell III (born 1946), son of Adam Clayton Powell, Jr. and Hazel Scott
- Adam Clayton Powell IV (born 1962), son of Adam Clayton Powell, Jr., member of the New York State Assembly

=== Other ===
- Adam Clayton Powell Jr. Boulevard, the name for Manhattan's Seventh Avenue, north of Central Park, in Harlem
- Adam Clayton Powell (film), a 1989 documentary about the civil rights leader
