= Samuel Powell =

Samuel or Sam Powell may refer to:

- Samuel Powell (Tennessee politician) (1776–1841), member of the U.S. House of Representatives from Tennessee
- Samuel S. Powell (1815–1879), American businessman, politician, and mayor of Brooklyn, New York
- Samuel Powell (cricketer), English cricketer and umpire.
- Samuel Powell, builder of the Samuel Powell House, Waterville, Kansas, listed on the NRHP-listed in Marshall County
- Samuel Powel (1738–1793), colonial and post-revolutionary mayor of Philadelphia, Pennsylvania
- Sam Powell (born 1992), English rugby league footballer
- Sam Powell (footballer) (1899–1961), English footballer

== See also ==
- Sam Powell-Pepper (born 1998), Australian rules footballer
