= Kenneth Powell =

Kenneth Powell may refer to:

== Sports ==
- Kenneth Powell (sprinter) (1940–2022), Indian sprinter
- Kenneth Powell (tennis) (1885–1915), British tennis player
- Kenneth Powell (hurdler), British hurdler and champion at the Inter-Empire Championships

== Others ==
- Kenneth J. W. Powell, Bishop Primus of the Free Church of England
- Kenneth R. Powell (1915–1987), U.S. Air Force officer

== See also ==
- Ken Powell (Kendall J. Powell, born c. 1950), American businessman; chief executive officer of General Mills
