= Alfred Powell =

Alfred Powell may refer to:

- Alfred H. Powell (1781–1831), American politician
- Alfred Hoare Powell (1865–1960), English architect and designer
- Alfred Powell (cricketer) (1908–1985), English cricketer
- Jay Powell (politician) (Alfred J. Powell Jr., 1952–2019), member of the legislature of the U.S. State of Georgia
