= Lee Powell =

Lee Powell may refer to:

- Lee Powell (actor) (1908–1944), U.S. film actor
- Lee Powell (footballer) (born 1973), Welsh footballer

== See also ==
- Lee Howells (born 1968), British footballer and manager
- Les Powell (disambiguation)
- Lew Powell (fl. 1974–2012), an American journalist, author, and newspaper editor
- Powell v Lee (1908), an English contract law case
