= Ronald Powell (disambiguation) =

Ronald Powell (1991–2024) was an American football linebacker.

Ronald Powell may also refer to:

- Ron Powell (1929–1992), English goalkeeper
- Ronald Powell (Australian cricketer) (1883–1922), Australian cricketer
- Ronald Powell (Nevisian cricketer) (born 1968), Nevisian cricketer
- Ronald Powell (footballer) (born 1947), English striker
- Ronald Powell (rower) (1884–1930), English rower
- Ronnie Powell (American football) (born 1974), American football wide receiver and kick returner
