= Francis Powell =

Francis Powell may refer to:

- Francis Powell (priest) (1905–1998), Dean of Belize
- Sir Francis Powell, 1st Baronet (1827–1911), English politician
- Francis Powell (Royal Navy officer) (1849–1927)
- Franny Powell (born 1977), English footballer

== See also ==
- Frank Powell (disambiguation)
