= Matthew Powell =

Matthew Powell may refer to:

- Matt Powell (born 1978), Welsh rugby union footballer
- Matthew Powell (Australian footballer) (born 1973), former Australian rules footballer
- Matthew Powell (soccer) (born 1996), American soccer player
