= Caroline Powell =

Caroline Powell may refer to:

- Caroline Powell (athlete), British masters athlete
- Caroline Powell (equestrian), New Zealand equestrian
- Caroline Powell (skier), British skier
- Caroline Amelia Powell, Irish-born American engraver and illustrator
