= Powell Butte (disambiguation) =

Powell Butte may refer to:

- Powell Butte, Boring Lava Field, Portland, Multnomah County, Oregon, USA; an extinct cindercone butte
- Powell Butte, Oregon, USA; an unincorporated community in Crook County
- Powell Buttes, Crook County, Oregon, USA; five rhyolitic butte mountains

== See also ==
- Mount Powell (disambiguation)
- Powell (disambiguation)
- Butte (disambiguation)
