= Ian Powell =

Ian Powell may refer to:

- Ian Powell (footballer)
- Ian Powell (swimmer)
- Ian Powell (businessman)
