= Jack Powell =

Jack Powell may refer to:

- Jack Powell (athlete) (1910–1982), British Olympic athlete
- Jack Powell (footballer, born 1860) (1860–1947), Welsh footballer
- Jack Powell (footballer, born 1994), English footballer
- Jack Powell (pitcher, born 1874) (1874–1944), American baseball pitcher
- Jack Powell (pitcher, born 1891) (1891–1930), American baseball pitcher
- Jack Powell (rugby union, born 1882) (1882–1941), Welsh rugby union player
- Jack Powell (rugby union, born 1894) (1894–1968), Welsh rugby union player

== See also ==
- Jackie Powell (1871–1955), South African rugby union player
- John Powell (disambiguation)
