= Art Powell =

Art or Arthur Powell may refer to:

- Art Powell (wide receiver) (1937–2015), former American football wide receiver
- Art Powell (coach) (1884–1969), head coach of the Buffalo Bulls college basketball program, 1915–1943
- Arthur E. Powell (1882–1969), theosophist and author
- Arthur William Baden Powell (1901–1987), New Zealand malacologist, naturalist and palaeontologist
- Spence Powell (1903–1970), Arthur Thomas (Spence) Powell
- Peter Baden-Powell, 2nd Baron Baden-Powell (1913–1963), Arthur Robert Peter Baden-Powell
- Baden Powell (politician) (1900–1955), Arthur Redvers Baden Powell

== See also ==
- Arthur Powell (disambiguation)
- Arthur Powell Davies
