= Charles Powell =

Charles Powell may refer to:

- Charles Powell, Baron Powell of Bayswater (born 1941), British diplomat and businessman
- Charles Powell (historian) (born 1960), British-Spanish historian
- Charles Powell Hamilton (1747–1825), British admiral
- Charles Berkeley Powell (1858–1933), Canadian businessman and politician
- Charles Lawrence Powell (1902–1975), U.S. federal judge
- Charley Powell (1932–2014), American football player
- Charles Lee Powell (1863–1959), American structural engineer and entrepreneur
- Charles Wesley Powell (1854–1927), American orchidologist
- Charles Powell III, American stock car racing driver
- Charlie Powell (rugby union), English rugby union player
