= Powdrell =

Powdrell is a surname. Notable people with the surname include:

- Jane Powdrell-Culbert (born 1949), American politician
- Ryan Powdrell (born 1983), American footballer
- Walter Powdrell (1872–1921), New Zealand politician

== See also ==
- Powell (surname)
