= Albert Powell =

Albert Powell may refer to:

- Albert Powell (South African sportsman) (1873–1948), South African cricketer and rugby union player
- Albert Powell (English cricketer) (1893–1979)
- Albert Powell (footballer) (1908–1940), Welsh footballer
