= Powell High School =

Powell High School can refer to:

- Powell High School (Tennessee) in Powell, Tennessee
- Powell High School (Wyoming) in Powell, Wyoming

== See also ==
- Powell Middle School (disambiguation)
- Powell (disambiguation)
