= Henry Powell (footballer) =

Australian rules footballer, born 1907

Personal information
- Full name: Henry Powell
- Born: 6 September 1907; Brunswick, Victoria
- Died: 3 March 1992 (aged 84)
- Height: 174 cm (5 ft 9 in)
- Weight: 72 kg (159 lb)

Playing career^{1}
Years	Club	Games (Goals)
1928	Fitzroy	1 (0)
- ^{1} Playing statistics correct to the end of 1928.

Henry Powell (6 September 1907 – 3 March 1992) was an Australian rules footballer who played with Fitzroy in the Victorian Football League (VFL).

The son of Henry Charles Powell (1878–1930) and Margaret Agnes Powell (1877–1920), née Ryan, Henry Powell was born at Brunswick, Victoria on 6 September 1907.
