= Edward Powell =

Edward or Eddie Powell may refer to:

- Edward Powell (martyr) (c. 1478–1540), Welsh Roman Catholic priest and theologian
- Edward B. Powell (1909–1984), American arranger, orchestrator and composer
- Edward Angus Powell Jr. (born 1948), former president of the United Service Organizations
- Eddie Powell (1927–2000), British stuntman and actor
- Eddie Powell (baseball) (1910–1986), American baseball player
- Ted Powell (Edward W. Powell, 1940–2005), English amateur footballer
- E. Alexander Powell (1879–1957), American war correspondent
- E. Henry Powell (1839–1911), American Civil War veteran and politician
