= Arthur Powell =

Arthur Powell may refer to:

- Arthur E. Powell (1882–1969), Theosophist
- Arthur Ted Powell (born 1947), British-born advertising art director, artist and printmaker
- Baden Powell (malacologist) (Arthur William Baden Powell, 1901–1987), New Zealand malacologist, naturalist and palaeontologist

== See also ==
- Art Powell (disambiguation)
