= Brian Powell =

Brian Powell may refer to

- Brian Powell (baseball) (1973–2009), American baseball player
- Brian Powell (sociologist) (born 1954), American sociologist
