= Ray Powell =

Ray Powell may refer to:

- Ray Powell (baseball) (1888–1962), Major League Baseball player
- Ray Powell (Australian footballer) (1923–1993), Australian rules footballer
- Ray Powell (Welsh footballer) (1924–2014), Welsh association footballer
- Ray Powell (ice hockey) (1925–1998), ice hockey player with the Chicago Black Hawks
- Ray Powell (New Mexico politician), New Mexico Land Commissioner
- Ray Powell (police officer), former president of the National Black Police Association
- Ray Powell (British politician) (1928–2001), member of Parliament of the United Kingdom
- Ray Edwin Powell (1887–1973), founder of Alcan
