= Henry Powell =

Henry Powell is the name of:

== People ==
- Henry Powell (governor) (c. 1600–1658), governor of Barbados
- Henry Watson Powell (1733–1814), British officer
- Henry Powell (Wisconsin politician) (1828–1902), American politician
- E. Henry Powell (1839–1911), politician in Vermont
- Henry Absalom Powell (1855–1930), Canadian lawyer and politician
- Henry Powell (footballer) (1907–1992), Australian rules footballer for Fitzroy
- Henry Powell (Louisiana politician) (born 1945), American politician, member of the Louisiana House of Representatives from 1996 to 2008

== Fictional characters ==
- Henry Powell (24), a character in the TV series 24

== See also ==
- Harry Powell (disambiguation)
