= Les Powell =

Les Powell may refer to:

- Les Powell (footballer, born 1912), Australian rules footballer with Essendon and South Melbourne
- Les Powell (footballer, born 1921), Australian rules footballer with Fitzroy and Geelong

== See also ==
- Leslie Powell, World War I flying ace
