= Powell Middle School =

Powell Middle School may refer to:

- JP Powell Middle School (LaFayette, Alabama), USA
- John Wesley Powell Middle School (Centennial, Colorado), USA
- Powell Middle School (Littleton, Colorado), USA
- Powell Middle School, Hernando County School Board, Spring Hill, Florida, USA
- Colin Powell Middle School (Matteson), Elementary School District 159, Illinois, USA
- Powell Middle School, Romeo Community Schools, Romeo, Michigan, USA
- Powell Middle School in Jackson, Mississippi, successor to Sam M. Brinkley High School
- Powell Middle School (Powell, Tennessee), USA

== See also ==
- Powell (disambiguation)
- Powell High School (disambiguation)
