= Harry Powell =

Harry Powell may refer to:

- Preacher Harry Powell, a fictional character in Davis Grubb's 1953 novel The Night of the Hunter
- Harry Powell (footballer) (1878–1930), Australian rules footballer
- Harry James Powell (1853–1922), British glassmaker
- Harry Powell (cricketer), Welsh cricketer
- Harry Powell (bowls), English lawn bowler

== See also ==
- Henry Powell (disambiguation)
- Harold Powell (disambiguation)
