= Anthony Powell (disambiguation) =

Anthony Powell (1905–2000) was an English novelist.

Anthony Powell may else refer to:

- Anthony Powell (designer) (1935–2021), English costume designer
- Anthony J. Powell (born 1962), judge of the Kansas Court of Appeals
- Tony Powell (sprinter) (Anthony Joseph Burwood Powell, born 1943), Canadian sprinter

== See also ==
- Tony Powell (disambiguation)
