= Jack Powell (rugby union, born 1894) =

- Full name: John Powell
- Born: 12 August 1894 Cardiff, Wales
- Died: 7 February 1968 (aged 73) Llandough, Wales

Rugby union career
- Position: Wing three–quarter
International career
Years	Team	Apps	(Points)
1923	Wales	1	(4)

John Powell (12 August 1894 – 7 February 1968) was a Welsh international rugby union player.

Powell, born in Cardiff, was a younger brother of Wales representative Wickham Powell.

A winger, Powell played his rugby for Cardiff RFC, where his three–quarter partnership with Arthur Cornish proved a success. He got a Wales opportunity for a 1923 Five Nations match against Ireland in Dublin, when Tom Johnson was declared unavailable to make the trip. His drop goal contributed the only points scored by Wales in a 4–5 loss.

== See also ==
- List of Wales national rugby union players
