= Powell Mountain (Mineral County, Nevada) =

Mountain in Nevada, United States

Coordinates: 38°19′40″N 118°41′59″W

Powell Mountain is a summit in the U.S. state of Nevada. The elevation is 9,524 feet (2,903 m).

Powell Mountain was named after A. Powell, a businessperson in the local mining industry.
