= Louis Powell =

West Indian cricketer

Louis St Vincent Powell (13 November 1902 – 6 June 1995) played first-class cricket for Somerset in 10 matches between 1927 and 1938. He was an all-round sportsman who also once played rugby for Bath Rugby Club. He was born at Kingstown, St Vincent and died at Bath, Somerset.

Powell was a right-handed lower-order batsman and a right-arm fast bowler. He was a prominent member of Bath Cricket Club, and eight of his 10 first-class matches were played at Bath. His debut in 1927, however, was at Taunton and the three Lancashire wickets he took in that game amounted to more than half his first-class career total. In his Obituary in Wisden Cricketers' Almanack in 1996, Powell's batting in this match was also discussed: "He was... forced to face Ted McDonald in full cry when he went out to bat (at) No 10...: the senior pro Tom Young noticed his pads were not good enough, loaned him his and Powell made 22." Powell played a couple of matches in 1927 and then one in 1928, but reappeared more regularly in matches at Bath from 1934 to 1938. His first match on his return was his most successful: still batting at No 10, he made 52 against Hampshire sharing a ninth wicket stand of 97 (Wisden says 101) with Jack White.

Powell also played rugby union for Bath and for Somerset. A ubiquitous figure in Bath sport, Louis Powell trophies are still competed for at Bath Cricket Club and Bath Golf Club at Sham Castle, and he was the first to broadcast cricket commentary on a hospital radio system at the Royal United Hospital in Bath, covering cricket from the Recreation Ground alongside Bill Andrews.

In 1935, Powell married Nora Pratten from Midsomer Norton, Somerset, daughter of Frank Pratten who founded Prattens, manufacturer of prefabricated classrooms and other buildings.
