= Gregory Powell =

Gregory Powell may refer to:

- Greg Powell, American stuntman
- Gregory Powell (murderer), accomplice in The Onion Field murder
- D. Gregory Powell, Canadian physician
- Powell and Donovan, fictional characters from Isaac Asimov's Robot short stories
