= Alan Powell =

Alan Powell may refer to:

- Alan Powell (actor) (born 1985), American actor and singer
- Alan Powell (drummer), British musician
- Alan Powell (entrepreneur) (born 1967), American businessman
- Alan Powell (historian) (1936–2020), Australian historian and author
- Alan Powell (politician) (born 1951), American politician from Georgia

== See also ==
- Allan Powell (1876–1948), Chairman of the BBC Board of Governors
