= Colonel Powell =

Colonel Powell may refer to:

== People ==
- Colin Powell (1937–2021), former U.S. Secretary of State, Chairman of the Joint Chiefs of Staff and 4-star general
- Donald Powell (1896–1942), British India Army officer who was awarded the D.S.O.
- Enoch Powell (1912–1998), British WWII colonel and politician
- George Gabriel Powell (1710–1779), provincial politician and militia colonel of the colony of South Carolina
- James R. Powell (American city founder) (1814–1883), Alabama state militia colonel and politician
- William Edward Powell (1788–1864), Colonel of the Royal Cardiganshire Militia, politician, Sheriff, Lord Lieutenant, and British MP
- William Thomas Rowland Powell (1815–1878), Colonel of the Royal Cardiganshire Militia, politician, and British MP
- Robert M. Powell (19th century), Confederate colonel in the American Civil War who commanded the 5th Texas Infantry Regiment
- Colonel Powell (17th century), Royalist officer in the English Civil War who fought at Pembroke Castle
- Leven Powell (1737–1810), colonial lieutenant colonel in the Continental Army
- John Wesley Powell (1834–1902), Union brevet lieutenant colonel, geologist and geographer

== Fictional characters ==
- Union Colonel Powell, a fictional character in the 2012 film John Carter
- Katherine Powell, a fictional British Army colonel in the 2015 film Eye in the Sky

== See also ==
- General Powell (disambiguation), any of several general officers who rose through the rank of Colonel
- Powell (disambiguation)
- Colonel (disambiguation)
