= Powell River =

Powell River may refer to:

== Places ==
- Powell River (British Columbia), a river on the Sunshine Coast of British Columbia in Canada
- Powell River, British Columbia, a city in Canada
  - Powell River Airport
- Powell River Regional District, a former regional district in British Columbia, Canada, now known as the qathet Regional District
- Powell River School District, a school board on the Sunshine Coast in British Columbia, Canada
- Powell River (Tennessee River), a tributary of the Clinch River in the United States

== Other uses ==
- Powell River Company (1908–1959), a forestry company that merged into what is now MacMillan Bloedel
- Powell River-class ferry, a class of ferry operated by BC Ferries
