= David Powell (aerospace engineer) =

American aerospace engineer and control systems textbook author

J. David Powell
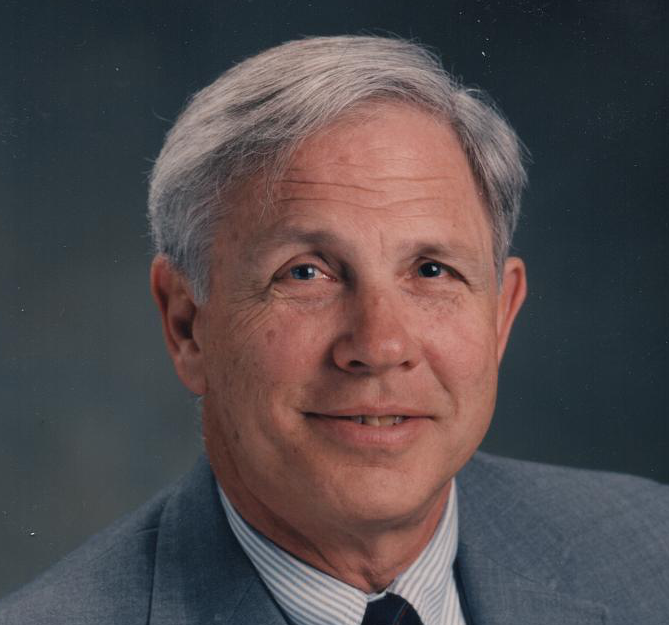
- David Powell's Portrait
- Born: John David Powell
- Education: Massachusetts Institute of Technology; Stanford University
- Occupations: Aerospace and mechanical engineering professor
- Known for: Feedback control systems textbooks, GPS-aided attitude determination research
- Website: https://profiles.stanford.edu/j-david-powell

John David Powell, (known as J. David Powell or David Powell), is an American aerospace engineer and professor emeritus of aeronautics and astronautics at Stanford University.

His research focused on control systems for aerospace vehicles, automotive engine control, and GPS-aided attitude determination, and the benefits of GPS navigation. He is best known as co-author of widely used textbooks on feedback control.

== Early life and education ==
Powell earned a B.S. in mechanical engineering from the Massachusetts Institute of Technology in 1960. He received an M.S. in 1966 and a Ph.D. in 1970, both in aeronautics and astronautics, from Stanford University.

Before academia, he worked in industry: from 1960 to 1961 as an engine design and testing engineer at Outboard Marine Corp.; 1961-1967 as an engineer at Lockheed in aerospace guidance and control; 1967-1968 at Analytical Mechanics Associates; and 1968-1970 at Systems Control, Inc., where he worked on parameter identification of aircraft models from flight data and automatic generation of approach paths for air traffic control.

== Career ==
Powell joined the Stanford faculty in 1971 with joint appointments in the Departments of Aeronautics and Astronautics and Mechanical Engineering. He served until 1998, when he became professor emeritus, and has continued research activities as emeritus faculty.

He co-founded GyroSat Corp. (1999-2000), which developed GPS-aided attitude determination. He served on the International Committee on Airspace Standards and Calibration (1995-2019; honorary member since 2021).

He is a fellow of the American Institute of Aeronautics and Astronautics (1995) and American Society of Mechanical Engineers (1999), and a member of SAE, IEEE, and ION.

== Research ==
Powell's research included digital control implementation, internal combustion engine modeling and control, tethered spacecraft dynamics for artificial gravity, and GPS/inertial sensor fusion for attitude and navigation.

His contributions related to GPS augmentation, the Wide Area Augmentation System (WAAS), provided enhanced aviation safety through improved pilot displays, improved flight inspection of landing systems, and safer use of closely-spaced parallel runways.[5]

Later work advanced low-cost GPS/inertial attitude determination for general aviation glass cockpits and drone navigation systems. He has authored or co-authored over 100 papers.

== Selected publications ==
=== Books ===
- Digital Control of Dynamic Systems (1st ed. with Gene F. Franklin, Addison-Wesley, 1980; later eds. with Michael L. Workman).
- Feedback Control of Dynamic Systems (multiple eds. with Gene F. Franklin, Abbas Emami-Naeini, et al.; widely regarded as a leading text in classical control).

=== Selected papers ===
- Chang, C.F.; Fekete, N.P.; Amstutz, A.; Powell, J.D. (1995). "Air-fuel ratio control in spark-ignition engines using estimation theory". IEEE Transactions on Control Systems Technology. 3 (1): 22-31. doi:10.1109/87.370706.
- He, X.; Powell, J.D. (1990). "Tether damping in space". Journal of Guidance, Control, and Dynamics. 13 (1): 104-112. doi:10.2514/3.20523.
- Powell, J.D.; Fekete, N.P.; Chang, C.F. (1998). "Observer-based air-fuel ratio control". IEEE Control Systems Magazine. 18 (5): 72-83. doi:10.1109/37.722254.
- Carlson, C.R.; Gerdes, J.C.; Powell, J.D. (2004). "Error Sources When Land Vehicle Dead Reckoning with Differential Wheelspeeds". NAVIGATION. 51 (1): 13. (Co-recipient of the 2004 Dr. Samuel M. Burka Award).

== Honors and awards ==
- Vincent Bendix Automotive Electronics Engineering Award, Society of Automotive Engineers (SAE), 1991.
- Fellow, American Institute of Aeronautics and Astronautics (AIAA), 1995.
- Arch T. Colwell Merit Award, Society of Automotive Engineers (SAE), 1996.
- Vincent Bendix Automotive Electronics Engineering Award, Society of Automotive Engineers (SAE), 1998.
- Fellow, American Society of Mechanical Engineers (ASME), 1999.
- Dr. Samuel M. Burka Award, Institute of Navigation, 2004 (shared with Christopher R. Carlson and J. Christian Gerdes for their co-authored paper).
