= Herbert Powell =

Herbert Powell may refer to:

- Herbert B. Powell (1903–1998), U.S. Army 4-star general
- Herbert Edward Powell (1871–1940), South Australian artist
- Herbert Powell, American architect from California and partner of Norman Foote Marsh
- Bert Powell (Herbert Harold Powell, 1880–after 1923), English footballer
- Herbert Marcus Powell FRS (1906-1991), British chemist; see List of fellows of the Royal Society elected in 1953
- Marcus Herbert Powell, the founder of Richardson Mine
- Herbert Powell (The Simpsons), a fictional character on The Simpsons
