= Jeff Powell =

Jeff Powell may refer to:

- Jeff Powell (American football) (born 1963), American football player
- Jeff Powell (rower) (born 1976), Canadian rower
