= Albert Powell (English cricketer) =

English cricketer

Personal information
- Full name: Albert James Powell
- Born: 8 December 1893; Presteigne, Radnorshire, Wales
- Died: 15 February 1979 (aged 85); Liskeard, Cornwall, England
- Batting: Right-handed
- Bowling: Right arm medium

Domestic team information
- Years: Team
- 1921: Worcestershire
- First-class debut: 17 August 1921; Worcestershire v Lancashire

Career statistics
Competition	FC
Matches	1
Runs scored	10
Batting average	5.00
100s/50s	0/0
Top score	9
Balls bowled	18
Wickets	0
Bowling average	–
5 wickets in innings	0
10 wickets in match	0
Best bowling	–
Catches/stumpings	0/–
- Source: CricketArchive, 12 May 2008

Albert James Powell (8 December 1893 – 15 February 1979) was an English cricketer, who played a single first-class match, for Worcestershire against Lancashire at Worcester in August 1921. In an innings defeat for his county, Powell playing as a bowler scored 9 and 1, also bowling three wicketless overs.
