= Joseph Powell =

Joseph or Joe Powell may refer to:

- Joseph Powell (painter) (1780–1834), English watercolourist, sometimes called "John Powell"
- Joseph Powell (congressman) (1828–1904), U.S. Representative from Pennsylvania
- Joe Powell (Australian footballer) (1868–1945), Australian rules footballer
- Joe Powell (footballer, born 1870) (1870–1896), English footballer
- Joe Powell (stunt performer) (1922–2016), English stuntman and actor
- Jody Powell (Joseph Lester Powell, 1943–2009), White House Press Secretary during the presidency of Jimmy Carter
- Joe Powell (rugby union) (born 1994), Australian rugby union player
- Joe Powell (American football) (born 1994), American football defensive back
- Joe Powell (footballer, born 1998), English footballer for Burton Albion
- Joe Powell (politician), British politician
