= Randy Powell =

Randy Powell may refer to:

- Randy Powell (actor) in Vegas (1978 TV series)
- Randy Powell (politician)
