= Sandy Powell =

Sandy Powell may refer to:

- Sandy Powell (comedian) (1900–1982), British
- Sandy Powell (costume designer) (born 1960), British
