= Philip Powell =

Philip Powell may refer to:

- Philip Powell (martyr) (1594–1646), Welsh-born Roman Catholic priest and martyr
- Sir Philip Powell (architect) (1921–2003), British architect
- Philip Wayne Powell (1913–1987), American historian
