= Richard Powell (athlete) =

British wheelchair racer

Richie Powell
Personal information
- Full name: Richard John Powell
- Nickname: Richie
- Nationality: British
- Born: c. 1971 (age 53–54) Tredegar, Wales
- Height: 6 ft 2 in (188 cm)

Sport
- Sport: Wheelchair racing

Achievements and titles
- Paralympic finals: Barcelona
- World finals: Birmingham, UK

Richard John "Richie" Powell (born c. 1971) is a British wheelchair racer.

After a motorcycle accident on 30 June 1989, at the age of 18, he became paralysed from the chest down. He took up sports when he spent a year at the Rookwood Hospital in Cardiff, as the spinal unit had a sports club.

He represented Great Britain at the 1992 Summer Paralympics in the men's 100 m, and 200m TW3.

He has taken part in the 1994 Commonwealth Games, and the 1998 IPC World Championships.
