= John Powell (Jesuit) =

American priest and author

John Joseph Powell (September 22, 1925 – September 24, 2009) was a Jesuit priest and author, and brother of Rita Donlan and William Powell.

He received elementary-school education at the John B. Murphy public school in Chicago. In June 1943, Powell graduated from the Loyola Academy in Chicago. In August 1943, he entered the Society of Jesus at Milford, Ohio. In the fall of 1947, he began a three-year course in philosophy at West Baden College, and enrolled in Loyola University, where he took a Bachelor of Arts degree the following June. He began graduate work at Loyola in 1948 and was ordained to the priesthood in 1956.

Powell worked at West Baden University (1961-1965), the Bellarmine School of Theology of Loyola University (1965-1968) and Loyola University (1968-2001), where he became an associate professor of theology and psychology. Powell was a proponent of humanistic Catholicism and wrote many books mostly dealing with psychology and Catholic theology, and conducted spiritual retreats along with his counseling work. He later retired in Michigan and died in Clarkston, allegedly with Alzheimer's disease.

Powell was accused of abusing of at least seven female students in the 1960s and 1970s. He was first sued in 2003 and again in 2006. Six of his alleged victims settled their litigation with the Jesuits in 2005. Powell’s documents, which are housed at the Jesuit Archives & Research Center in St. Louis have not yet been released to researchers.

== Publications ==
- Why Am I Afraid to Tell You Who I Am? ISBN 978-0-88347-323-8
- Why Am I Afraid to Love? ISBN 978-0-00-628109-2
- The Secret of Staying in Love ISBN 978-0913592298
- Unconditional love ISBN 978-0895050298
- Fully human, fully alive: A new life through a new vision ISBN 0-88347-321-6
- He Touched Me - My Pilgrimage of Prayer ISBN 978-0913592472
- Will the Real Me Please Stand Up?: 25 Guidelines for Good Communication ISBN 978-1-55924-283-7
- A Reason to Live! A Reason to Die! ISBN 978-0-913592-61-8
- Abortion the Silent Holocaust (1981) ISBN 978-0-89505-063-2
- Happiness Is an Inside Job (1989) ISBN 1-55924-005-9
