= Dave Powell =

Australian rules footballer

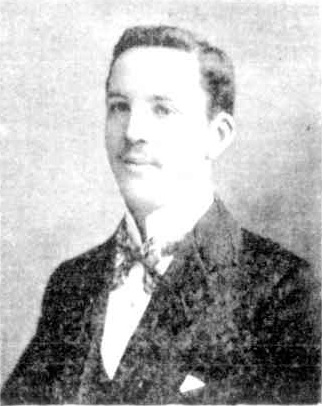
- Powell in 1899

Personal information
- Full name: David John Powell
- Born: 18 February 1876; Melbourne, Victoria
- Died: 22 August 1953 (aged 77); South Melbourne, Victoria

Playing career^{1}
Years	Club	Games (Goals)
1901–03	South Melbourne	27 (13)
- ^{1} Playing statistics correct to the end of 1903.

David John Powell (18 February 1876 – 22 August 1953) was an Australian rules footballer who played with South Melbourne in the Victorian Football League (VFL).
