= Roger Powell =

Roger Powell may refer to:

- Roger Powell (badminton), retired male badminton player from England
- Roger Powell (basketball) (born 1983), American former professional basketball player, head coach
- Roger Powell (bookbinder) (1896–1990), English bookbinder
- Roger Powell (general) (born 1949), retired officer of the Australian Army
- Roger Powell (musician) (born 1949), American musician known for being the former keyboardist of Utopia
- Roger Powell (scientist) (born 1949), emeritus professor of geology at the University of Melbourne
- Roger Powell (born 1944), British drummer and member of Mighty Baby
