= Harold Powell =

Harold Powell may refer to:

- Harold Powell (entomologist) (1875–1954), British entomologist
- Harold Powell (footballer) (1915–1993), Australian footballer
- Harold G. Powell (1924–2016), American founder of the Harold's clothing store chain (1948–2008)
- Harold Powell (bowls), England lawn bowler

== See also ==
- Harry Powell (disambiguation)
