= Les Powell (footballer, born 1921) =

Australian rules footballer

Personal information
- Full name: Leslie Maxwell Powell
- Born: 13 April 1921; Geelong, Victoria
- Died: 22 December 1999 (aged 78); North Geelong, Victoria
- Original team: Newtown & Chilwell
- Height: 185 cm (6 ft 1 in)
- Weight: 84 kg (185 lb)

Playing career^{1}
Years	Club	Games (Goals)
1943	Fitzroy	3 (0)
1944–46	Geelong	22 (5)
Total		25 (5)
- ^{1} Playing statistics correct to the end of 1946.

Leslie Maxwell Powell (13 April 1921 – 22 December 1999) was an Australian rules footballer who played with Fitzroy and Geelong in the Victorian Football League (VFL).

Powell also served in the Australian Army during World War II.
