= Wickham Powell =

Wales international rugby union & league footballer

Personal information
- Full name: Wickham James Powell
- Born: 13 September 1892 Cardiff, Wales
- Died: 20 March 1961 (aged 68) Cyncoed, Wales

Playing information

Rugby union
- Position: Wing
Club
Years	Team	Pld	T	G	FG	P
1919–20	Cardiff RFC	26	17
Representative
Years	Team	Pld	T	G	FG	P
1920	Wales	4	2	0	0	6

Rugby league
- Position: Wing
Club
Years	Team	Pld	T	G	FG	P
1920–22	Rochdale Hornets
Representative
Years	Team	Pld	T	G	FG	P
1921	Other Nationalities	1	0	0	0	0

Wickham "Wick" James Powell (13 September 1892 – 20 March 1961) was a Welsh dual-code international rugby union, and professional rugby league footballer who played in the 1910s and 1920s. He played representative level rugby union (RU) for Wales, and at cub level for Cardiff RFC (captain), as a wing, and representative level rugby league (RL) for the Other Nationalities, and at cub level for Rochdale Hornets.

== International honours ==
Wick Powell won caps for Wales (RU) while at Cardiff RFC in 1920 against England, Scotland, France, and Ireland, and won a cap for Other Nationalities (RL) while at Rochdale Hornets in 1921 against England.

== Personal history ==
Powell was born in Cardiff in 1892. His brother Jack Powell (born 12 August 1894 in Cardiff – died 7 February 1968 aged 73 in Llandough/Llandough, Penarth/Llandow) also played for Cardiff and was capped for Wales against Ireland in 1923, as a wing. During World War I Wick Powell served with the 38th (Welsh) Infantry Division in France, returning to Cardiff after the end of hostilities to captain Cardiff RFC in the 1919-1920 season. He changed rugby football codes from rugby union to rugby league when he transferred from Cardiff RFC to the Rochdale Hornets. After breaking his shoulder in the Rochdale Hornets's 2-16 defeat by Australia during the 1921–22 Kangaroo tour of Great Britain match at Athletic Grounds, Rochdale on Saturday 12 November 1921, he retired from rugby league, and returned to Cardiff in 1922 where he captained Cardiff at bowls, while becoming the landlord of the Cardiff Cottage public house, St Mary Street, Cardiff and then the City Arms Hotel public house on Quay Street, Cardiff, just opposite the Cardiff Arms Park, he died, aged 68, in Cyncoed, Wales.
