= Richard M. Powell (investor) =

Richard M. Powell (born 12 June 1979) is a Jamaican private equity investor, serial entrepreneur, philanthropist, and World Economic Forum Young Global Leader. Powell is considered one of the rising stars of global finance and has been featured in Inc. Magazine and on CNBC. Powell is the Co-Founder and Senior Managing Director at APC Holdings, a private investment equity firm. Powell is also the chairman of the RMP Group, which provides consulting, marketing and branding advice to mid to large-size companies, Fortune 500 firms and government agencies. In 2010, Powell created the RMP Foundation. Modeling the efforts of the Bill and Melinda Gates Foundation, the RMP Foundation was formed to provide philanthropic relief to the global community.

== Early life and education ==
Powell was born in Spanish Town, Jamaica in 1979. At the age of 12, he came across Warren Buffett’s biography The Making of An American Capitalist. Powell was captivated by Buffet’s investment strategies and was most impressed with Buffet’s childhood entrepreneurial endeavors, namely, his childhood paper route that earned him a profit on every paper.

Powell attended Saint Andrews Preparatory in Kingston, Jamaica before enrolling in Campion College, a high school in the parish of St. Andrew. Once again surrounded by family and friends, Powell was encouraged to take up his passion for sports. Powell played football (soccer), tennis, table tennis, competed in track and field, and additionally became the youngest person ever from the Caribbean to be scouted by a professional soccer club — PSV Eindhoven in Europe.

A skilled football (soccer) player, Powell debated whether or not to attend Stanford University on a full soccer scholarship or play professionally in Europe. Ultimately, Powell decided to study economics at Harvard University.

While completing his undergraduate degree at Harvard, Powell and his brother Josef, started an e-commerce business called Fuxito "Fuxito is a word we invented, a cross between the international term for soccer – fútbol and the Spanish term for success, exito. Fuxito was a recruiting database that helped fútbol scouts and coaches worldwide find rising stars," said Powell. At only 19 years old, Powell was the chief operating officer of a $100 million company with 35 employees.

== Career ==
In 2003, Powell and fellow Harvard alumnus Frantz Alphonse created AP Capital Partners a private equity firm that has created a portfolio that generates $1.5 billion and employs 7,000 people. Currently, AP Capital Partners has formed a union with ZeroChaos which has resulted in the acquisition of New York-based FlexCorp Systems.
