= Powell, Haakon County, South Dakota =

Coordinates: 44°02′39″N 101°29′27″W

Powell is an extinct town in Haakon County, in the U.S. state of South Dakota. The GNIS classifies it as a populated place.

== History ==
A post office called Powell was established in 1908, and remained in operation until 1957. The town has the name of Dan Powell, a cattleman.
