= Gary Powell =

Gary Powell may refer to:

- Gary Powell (actor) (born 1963), British actor
- Gary Powell (footballer) (born 1969), English footballer
- Gary Powell (musician) (born 1969), British drummer
- Gary Powell (rugby union) (born 1979), rugby union player
