= Kenneth J. W. Powell =

Kenneth J. W. Powell is a former Bishop Primus of the Free Church of England. 2007 marked the eighteenth year of his Episcopate and the twenty-first year of his ordained ministry. Powell was the bishop of the southern diocese of his denomination until his retirement in 2007; Bishop Paul Hunt was subsequently consecrated bishop of the diocese. Powell also serves as General Secretary of the Free Church of England, by annual election at the convocation of his church.
