= Powell Creek =

Powell Creek, Powells Creek or Powell's Creek may refer to:

== In Australia ==
- Powells Creek (Sydney), a tributary of the Parramatta River in New South Wales

== In the United States ==
- Powell Creek, West Virginia, an unincorporated community in Boone County
- Powells Creek (Hyco River tributary), a stream in North Carolina and Virginia
- Powell Creek (Pennsylvania), a tributary of the Susquehanna River in Dauphin County
- Powell's Creek (James River tributary), a stream in Virginia
- Powells Creek (Potomac River tributary), a stream in Virginia
