= Simon Powell =

Simon Powell may refer to:

- Simon N. Powell (born 1955), British cancer researcher
- Simon G. Powell, British writer, filmmaker and musician
