= Eric Powell =

Eric Powell may refer to:

- Eric Powell (comics) (born 1975), American comic book artist and writer
- Eric Powell (American football) (born 1979), American football defensive end
- Eric Powell, American musician for the band 16Volt
- Eric Powell (racing driver) (born 1985), American racing driver
- Eric Powell (rower) (1886–1933), British rower
- Eric Powell (politician) (born 1966), American politician from Mississippi
