= Secretary Powell (disambiguation) =

Secretary Powell frequently refers to Colin Powell (1937–2021), U.S. Secretary of State and Chairman of the Joint Chiefs of Staff for the U.S. military.

Secretary Powell (Sec. Powell), Assistant Secretary, Undersecretary, Deputy Secretary, Parliamentary Secretary, Shadow Secretary, or variation, may also refer to:

== People ==
- Charles Powell, Baron Powell of Bayswater (born 1941), UK diplomatic service officer who rose to diplomatic mission First Secretary, and diplomatic service Private Secretary to UK Prime Minister John Major
- Dina Powell (born 1973), Assistant Secretary of State for Educational and Cultural Affairs and Deputy Undersecretary of State for Public Affairs and Public Diplomacy, under U.S. President George W. Bush
- Enoch Powell (1912–1998), British politician who was variously, Shadow Defence Secretary, Financial Secretary to the Treasury, Parliamentary Secretary to the Minister of Housing, Secretary to the Joint Intelligence Committee of several theatres
- Erica Powell (1921–2007), UK colonial service officer, who became Private Secretary Gold Coast, and then Private Secretary to the President of Ghana
- Jerome Powell (born 1953), Under Secretary of the Treasury for Domestic Finance under U.S. President George H. W. Bush
- Jody Powell (1943–2009), White House press secretary for U.S. President Jimmy Carter
- Jonathan Powell (Labour adviser) (born 1956), UK diplomatic service officer who rose to diplomatic mission Second Secretary
- Lucy Powell (born 1974) who served as Shadow Secretary of State of various portfolios
- Nancy Jo Powell (born 1947) who rose through the Secretarial ranks at the U.S. State Department before becoming an Ambassador

== See also ==
- Powell (disambiguation)
- Secretary (disambiguation)
