= Tony Powell =

Tony Powell may refer to:

- Tony Powell (cricketer) (born 1972), Jamaican cricketer
- Tony Powell (footballer) (born 1947), former English football defender
- Tony Powell (sprinter) (born 1943), Canadian sprinter
- Tony Powell, character in After the Fox

== See also ==
- Anthony Powell (disambiguation)
