= Chris Powell (disambiguation) =

Chris Powell (born 1969) is an English footballer and football manager

Chris or Christopher Powell may also refer to:

- Sir Christopher Powell, 4th Baronet (died 1742)
- Chris Powell (advertiser) (born 1943), British advertiser
- Chris Powell (personal trainer) (born 1978), celebrity trainer and host of Extreme Weight Loss
- Darkhawk (real name Chris Powell), a comic book character
- Christopher Powell (musician), American drummer
- Christopher Powell (cricketer) (born 1994), Jamaican cricketer
- Chris Powell (politician), candidate for governor of Oklahoma
- Chris Powell (comedian), American comedian, writer, and actor
