= Russell Powell =

Russell Powell may refer to:

- Russ Powell (1875–1950), American film actor
- Russell Powell (baseball) (fl. 1893–1921), American Negro Leagues catcher
