= Ryan Powell =

Ryan Powell may refer to:

- Ryan Powell (lacrosse) (born 1978), American lacrosse player
- Ryan Powell (rugby league) (born 1982), Australian rugby league player
- Ryan Powell (rugby union) (born 1980), Welsh rugby union player
