= James Powell (cricketer, born 1792) =

English cricketer

James Powell (3 April 1792 – 5 May 1870) was an English professional cricketer who played from 1818 to 1822. He was born at Eton, Buckinghamshire.

Mainly associated with Marylebone Cricket Club (MCC), he made 8 known appearances in important matches. He played for the Players in the Gentlemen v Players series. he died at Eton.
