= John Powell (physicist) =

British physicist and company director (1923–1996)

John Alfred Powell FRSE FIEE FRSA (1923–1996) was a 20th-century British physicist and company director. His most important creation was the EMI body scanner.

== Life ==
Powell was born on 4 November 1923 in Islip near Oxford, the son of Algernon Powell and his wife Constance Elsie Honour. From the tiny primary school he won a scholarship to be educated at Bicester County School in Oxfordshire.

In the Second World War he joined as an apprentice in the Royal Air Force based at RAF Halton in 1939, but was invalided out in 1941. He found a place assisting at Clarendon Laboratory at Oxford, and (taking several night-classes to improve his qualifications) then won a place at Oxford University studying physics. Gaining an honours degree (MA) he then returned to Clarendon Laboratories, where he gained a doctorate (PhD). In 1952 he received a postdoctorate research fellowship taking him to Ottawa in Canada.

In 1954 he returned to Britain working on semi-conductor research at Marconi Research Laboratories in Chelmsford. In 1957 he moved to Texas Instruments in Bedford as senior product engineer, devising a way to create cheap germanium crystals. This brought him rapid promotion, rising to assistant managing director for Northern Europe and in 1968 became vice president. This was based in Dallas, Texas. He determined to return to Britain, albeit to a lower position. After a search for a suitable position he became group technical director for EMI. His work here critically led to the development of the EMI brain scanner, which represented a major advancement in being able to view the brain. He persuaded EMI to create a new company to develop this product, EMI Medical Industries, which created a turnover of £100 million per annum. The company went on to create a body scanner and to dominate the world medical scanning market. His services made him an Honorary Fellow of the British Institute of Radiology.

In 1972 he additionally took on a role at Nuclear Enterprises Ltd as director, rising to chairman in 1976. This role at this time brought him into a degree of conflict with public opinion. This perhaps robbed him of what would otherwise be an expected knighthood.

In 1978 he was elected a Fellow of the Royal Society of Edinburgh. His proposers were Robert William Pringle, William Ewart John Farvis, Robert Allan Smith, James Cameron Gould, D M McCallum and Thomas Diery Patten.

He died on New Year's Eve, 31 December 1996.

== Family ==
In 1949 he married Zena Beatrice Steventon. They had two children, Garth and Ashley.
