= Powell, Cass County, Missouri =

Ghost town in Cass County, Missouri, United States

Coordinates: 38.716399°N 94.590788°W

Powell is an extinct town in Cass County, Missouri, United States.

== Description ==
A post office called Powell Siding was established in 1892, and remained in operation until 1900. The community had the name of J. M. Powell, the original owner of the town site.

== See also ==
- List of ghost towns in Missouri
