= Nick Powell (disambiguation) =

Nick Powell (born 1994) is an English professional footballer.

Nick Powell may also refer to:

- Nick Powell (bassist), English musician and songwriter
- Nick Powell (composer), British musician, composer and sound designer

== See also ==
- Nik Powell (1950–2019), British businessman
