= Lance Powell =

Lance Powell may refer to:

- Lance Powell (Brookside), a character from Brookside
- Lance Powell (The Bill), a character from The Bill
