= Ben Powell (disambiguation) =

Ben Powell (born 1984) is an Australian motorcycle speedway rider.

Ben Powell may also refer to:

- Benjamin Powell (born 1978), American economist
- Benjamin E. Powell (1905–1981), American librarian
- Benny Powell (1930–2010), African-American jazz trombonist
- Benny R. Powell, American comic book author and businessman
