= Andrew Powell (disambiguation) =

Andrew Powell may refer to:

- Andrew Powell (born 1949), music composer, performer, arranger and producer, a Henry Cow member
- Andrew Powell (politician) (born 1973), Australian politician
- Andy Powell (born 1950), guitarist and songwriter, an original Wishbone Ash member
- Andy Powell (rugby), Wales international rugby player
