= Jim Powell (filmmaker) =

American documentary film producer

Jim Powell is an American documentary film producer. A graduate of Kent State University, Powell is the producer of award-winning documentaries The Arnolds of Owen County and Space Camp. He also received awards for his performance in Missions-in-Motion. In 2006, Powell and his wife produced Children of the Storm, a documentary detailing the experiences of children who survived Hurricane Katrina.
