= Alfred Powell (cricketer) =

English cricketer

Personal information
- Full name: Alfred Peter Powell
- Born: 19 August 1908; Hampstead, London, England
- Died: 21 April 1985 (aged 76); Melton, Suffolk, England

Domestic team information
- Years: Team
- 1932–1937: Buckinghamshire
- 1927: Middlesex

Career statistics
Competition	First-class
Matches	1
Runs scored	0
Batting average	0.00
100s/50s	–/–
Top score	0
Balls bowled	–
Wickets	–
Bowling average	–
5 wickets in innings	–
10 wickets in match	–
Best bowling	–
Catches/stumpings	1/–
- Source: Cricinfo, 25 May 2011

Alfred Peter Powell (19 August 1908 – 21 April 1985) was an English cricketer with an unknown batting and bowling styles. He was born in Hampstead, London, and was educated at Mill Hill School, where he represented the school cricket team.

Powell played his only first-class match for Middlesex in the 1927 County Championship against Surrey. In this match, he was dismissed for a duck in both innings by Percy Fender.

Powell made his debut for Buckinghamshire in the 1932 Minor Counties Championship against Hertfordshire. Powell played Minor counties cricket for Buckinghamshire from 1932 to 1937, which included 25 Minor Counties Championship matches.
