= Jonathan Powell =

Jonathan Powell may refer to:

- Jonathan Powell (musician) (1969–2025), British musician
- Jonathan Powell (producer) (born 1947), British television producer and executive
- Jonathan Powell (civil servant) (born 1956), chief of staff to former British Prime Minister Tony Blair
- Jonathan Powell (cricketer) (born 1979), former English cricketer
- Jonathan Powell (classicist), British professor of Latin
