= Ellis Powell =

Ellis Powell may refer to:

- Ellis Powell (journalist) (1869-1922), British newspaper editor and colleague of Harry Marks
- Ellis Powell, an actress who played the lead role in Mrs Dale's Diary
