= Powell Smythe =

American 19th century politician

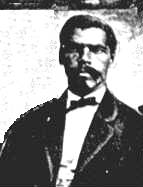

South Carolina House of Representatives
- In office 1868–?

Powell Smythe was a member of the South Carolina General Assembly during the Reconstruction era. He represented Clarendon County, South Carolina.

He served in the state House of Representatives in 1868 representing Clarendon County along with William Nelson. He supported Franklin J. Moses Jr. having his "disabilities" removed in 1868 after the American Civil War. An 1873 report showed him receiving 350 votes for a state representative seat. His photograph was included in a montage of Radical Republican South Carolina legislators.
