= Adam Powell (English politician) =

Member of the Parliament of England

Member (MP) of the Parliament of England for Gloucester
- In office 1529–1529

Personal details
- Born: by 1496
- Died: 5 March 1546 (aged 49–50) England
- Occupation: Politician

Adam Powell or Apowell (by 1496 – 5 March 1546), of Gloucester, was an English politician.

== Family ==
Powell married a woman named Mary, and they had one daughter and two sons.

== Career ==
He was a Member (MP) of the Parliament of England for Gloucester in 1529.
