= Powell Township =

Powell Township may refer to:

- Powell Township, Craighead County, Arkansas, in Craighead County, Arkansas
- Powell Township, Comanche County, Kansas
- Powell Township, Michigan
- Powell Township, Edmunds County, South Dakota, in Edmunds County, South Dakota
