= David Thomas Powell =

English clergyman and antiquary

David Thomas Powell (1772/73 – 9 June 1848) was an English clergyman and antiquary.

Born in Tottenham, the son of Thomas Powell, an occasional poet, Powell became a Lieutenant in the 14th Light Dragoons; he left a manuscript account of his 1794 experiences in Cork, Flanders and Brabant. He later entered Magdalen College, Oxford, receiving a B.C.L. in June 1805. He spent much of the rest of his life making heraldic and genealogical collections, and touring both England and Wales to produce watercolour sketches of churches and manor houses in over forty counties.

Powell died in 1848 aged 75, in Tottenham and was buried in the churchyard of St Nicholas Church, Loughton. In addition to his antiquarian material, Powell's library, sold by auction by Puttick & Simpson over three days, contained two ancient manuscripts sold for over £100 each: an illuminated book of hours, executed for George van Egmond, Bishop of Utrecht, and a psalter from the monastery of "Farehow". Many of Powell's own notes and drawings, and other manuscripts from his collections, are now held in the British Library. Other items are in the Bodleian Library, the Brotherton Library, Leeds, Lambeth Archives, Cardiff Central Library, and elsewhere. Most of his wealth was left to the London Hospital, which used it to build a new medical school in 1854.
