= Powells =

Powells or Powell's may refer to:

== Places ==
- Powell Islands (Powells), Raa Atoll, Maldives

=== Cities, towns, communities ===
- Powells Corners, Ontario, Canada

==== United States ====
- Powells Crossroads, Tennessee
- Powellton, California, formerly called Powell's Ranch

=== Watercourses, rivers, creeks ===
- Powell's Creek (Prince George County, Virginia), United States
- Powells Creek, a river in Prince William County, Virginia, United States
- Powells Creek (Sydney), Australia

== Mathematics ==
- Powell's method, an algorithm for finding a local minimum of a function
- Powell's dog leg method, an iterative optimization

== Other uses ==
- Powell's Books, a bookstore chain in Portland, Oregon, United States

== See also ==
- Powell (disambiguation)
