= Les Powell (footballer, born 1912) =

Australian rules footballer, born 1912

Personal information
- Full name: Leslie Roy Powell
- Born: 29 July 1912; Brunswick, Victoria
- Died: 12 December 1967 (aged 55); Prahran, Victoria
- Original team: Oakleigh
- Height: 170 cm (5 ft 7 in)
- Weight: 84 kg (185 lb)

Playing career^{1}
Years	Club	Games (Goals)
1937–38	Essendon	20 (0)
1939	South Melbourne	1 (0)
Total		21 (0)
- ^{1} Playing statistics correct to the end of 1939.

Leslie Roy Powell (29 July 1912 – 12 December 1967) was an Australian rules footballer who played with Essendon and South Melbourne in the Victorian Football League (VFL).
