= Craig Powell =

Craig Powell may refer to:

- Craig Powell (American football) (born 1971), American football player
- Craig Powell (musician) (born 1984), British musician
- Craig Powell (poet) (born 1940), Australian poet

== See also ==
- Kraig Powell (born 1966), member of the Utah House of Representatives
