= John Powell (painter) =

British portrait painter

- Occupation: Painter

John Powell (fl. 1770–1785?) was a British portrait painter.

== Biography ==
Powell was a pupil and assistant of Sir Joshua Reynolds, and an inmate of his house, where he was frequently employed in making reduced copies of Reynolds's portraits. These he executed with great fidelity, and occasionally exhibited at the Royal Academy. The portrait of the Duke of Cumberland in the National Portrait Gallery, after Reynolds, is stated to be the work of Powell. Among the pictures by Reynolds which were copied by Powell was the great family group of the Duke and Duchess of Marlborough with their children, now at Blenheim Palace. This important picture, being left in Powell's charge, was seized by his creditors, and narrowly escaped being cut up to pay his debts. According to James Northcote, Reynolds, on seeing Powell's copy, perceived some important errors in the composition which he subsequently corrected.
