= Peter Powell =

Peter Powell is the name of:

- Peter Powell (DJ) (born 1951), British DJ
- Peter Powell (kite maker) (1932–2016), inventor of a dual-line, steerable model of flying kite
