= Justice Powell (disambiguation) =

Lewis F. Powell Jr. (1907–1998) was an associate justice of the United States Supreme Court.

Justice Powell or Judge Powell may also refer to:

== People ==
- Cleo Powell (born 1957), associate justice of the Supreme Court of Virginia
- Richard H. Powell (1827–1917), associate justice of the Arkansas Supreme Court
- William Dummer Powell (1755–1834), chief justice of Upper Canada

== Characters ==
- Judge Powell, a fictional character from the 1964 drama film One Potato, Two Potato (film)

== See also ==
- Powell (surname)
