= Michael Powell (disambiguation) =

Michael Powell (1905–1990) was a British film director.

Michael Powell or Mike Powell may also refer to:

== Sportsmen ==
- Mike Powell (rugby union) (born 1978), rugby union player for the Ospreys
- Michael Powell (lacrosse) (born 1982), U.S. professional lacrosse player
- Mike Powell (cricketer, born 1975), English cricketer
- Mike Powell (cricketer, born 1977), Welsh cricketer
- Mike Powell (long jumper) (born 1963) American athlete, the world record holder in the long jump

== Others ==
- Michael Oliver Powell (born 1939), St Kitts politician and cabinet minister
- Michael Powell (Louisiana politician), American politician from Louisiana
- Michael Powell (Massachusetts politician), a colonial Massachusetts politician
- Mike Powell (radio executive), early British advocate of radio automation
- Michael Powell (lobbyist) (born 1963), attorney, former chairman of the U.S. Federal Communications Commission, son of Colin Powell
- Michael Powell (bookseller), owner of an American bookstore
- Michael J. Powell, American R&B musician
- Michael J. D. Powell (1936–2015), British applied mathematician
- Michael Warren Powell, American theatre artistic director, director, actor and designer
