= David Powell (footballer, born 1967) =

Former professional footballer

Personal information
- Full name: David Robert Powell
- Date of birth: 24 September 1967 (age 59)
- Place of birth: Cannock, England
- Height: 6 ft 1 in (1.85 m)
- Position: Goalkeeper

Senior career*
Years	Team	Apps	(Gls)
- Cherry Valley
1986–1988	West Bromwich Albion	2	(0)
1987	→ Wrexham (loan)	2	(0)
- * Club domestic league appearances and goals

David Robert Powell (born 24 September 1967) is an English former professional footballer who played as a goalkeeper. He made appearances in the English Football League with West Bromwich Albion and also on loan at Wrexham.

He is the youngest goalkeeper to have played a competitive first-team match for West Bromwich Albion, playing as a late replacement for Paul Bradshaw against Crystal Palace in the short-lived Full Members Cup on 23 October 1985 at the age of 18 years and 29 days.

He retired in 1988 after leaving West Bromwich Albion.
