= Mary Powell =

Mary Powell may refer to:

- Mary Powell (suffragist) (1854–1946), New Zealand temperance worker and suffragist
- Mary Powell (actress) (died 1723), English stage actress
- Mary Elizabeth Turner (1854–1907), née Powell, English embroiderer
- Mary Alice Powell Lindsay (1883–1979), first registered nurse in Utah
