= Powel =

Powel is a surname and given name. Notable people with the name include:

- David Powel (c.1549–1598), Welsh clergyman and historian
- Samuel Powel (1738–1793), American colonial politician
- Thomas Powel (1845–1922), Welsh academic
- William Garrigues Powel (1852–1894), American politician
- Powel Crosley Jr. (1886–1961), American industrialist
- Powel J. Smith (1874–1942), American businessman and politician

== See also ==
- Powell (disambiguation)
