= Frank Powell (disambiguation) =

Frank Powell was a stage and silent film actor, screenwriter and director in the United States.

Frank Powell may also refer to:

- David Franklin Powell (1847–1906), also known as D. Frank Powell, Wisconsin doctor, showman, patent medicine magnate and politician
- Frank John Powell (1891–1971), British politician and magistrate
- Frank Powell (footballer), Welsh football manager
- Frank Neff Powell, bishop of the Episcopal diocese of Southwestern Virginia
- Lieutenant Frank Powell, Philadelphia Police Department officer involved in the 1985 MOVE bombing

== See also ==
- Francis Powell (disambiguation)
