= Walter Powell =

Walter Powell may refer to:

- Walt Powell (born 1991), American football player
- Walter D. Powell (1891–1967), American football and basketball coach
- Walter E. Powell (1931–2020), American politician
- Walter W. Powell (born 1951), American sociologist known for studies of the biotechnology industry
- Walter S. Powell (1879–1961), American figure skating official
- W. R. H. Powell (Walter Rice Howell Powell, 1819–1889), British member of parliament (MP) for Carmarthenshire, 1880–1885, and West Carmarthenshire, 1885–1889
- Walter Powell (MP for Malmesbury) (1842–1881), British member of parliament for Malmesbury, 1868–1882
- Walter Clement Powell (1850–1883), American photographer
- Walter David Taylor Powell (1831–1906), Native Police officer
- Wally Powell, Australian rules footballer
