= Larry Powell (disambiguation) =

Larry Powell is a Republican member of the Kansas Senate.

Larry Powell may also refer to:

- Larry Powell (Manitoba politician), Green Party of Manitoba candidate, 2003
- Larry Powell (Gaelic footballer) see Paddy Doherty (Gaelic footballer)
- Larry Powell (author) from Able Team
