= Robert Powell (composer) =

American composer and choir director

Robert J. Powell
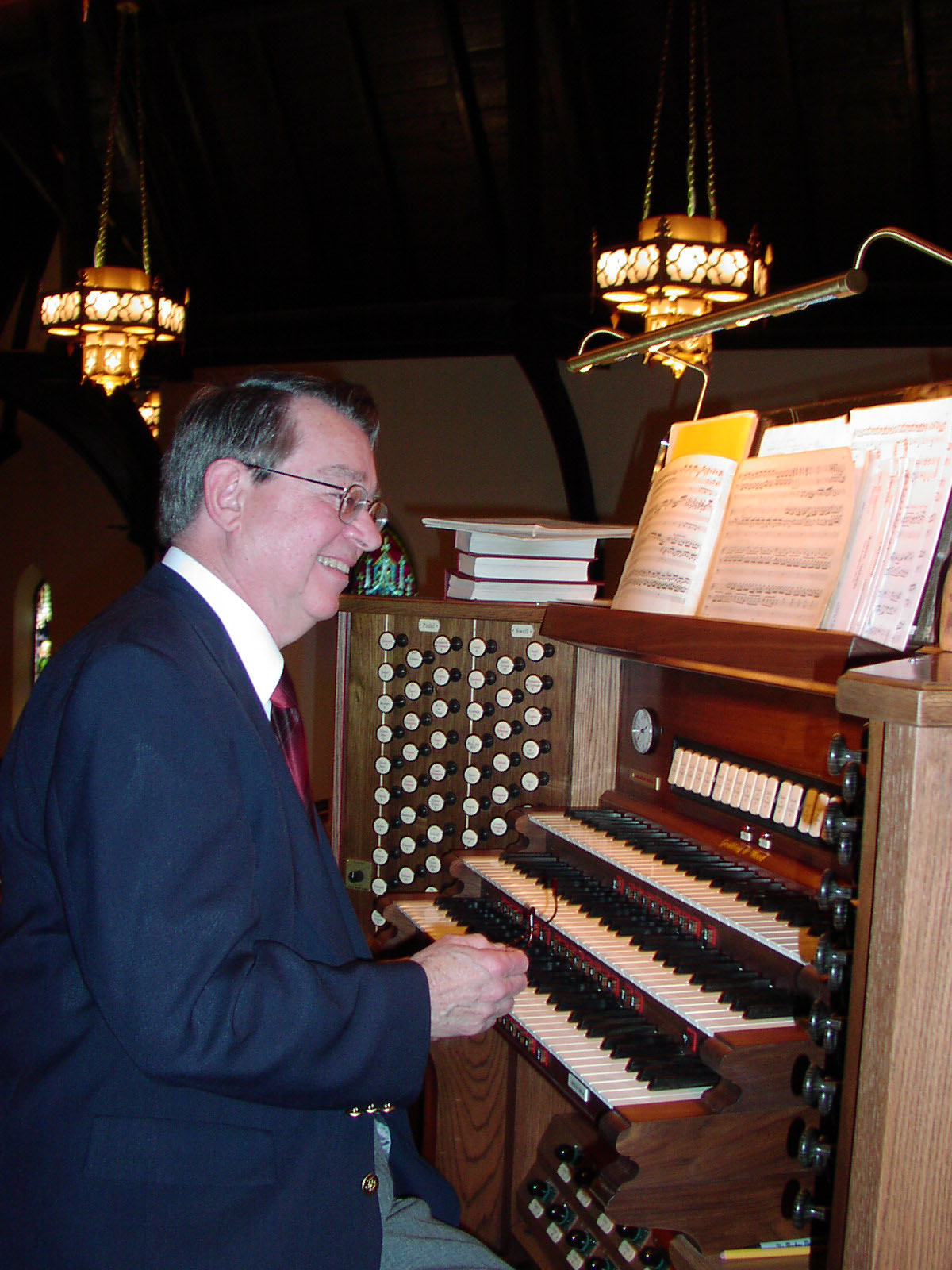
- Born: July 22, 1932; Benoit, Mississippi, United States
- Died: January 17, 2025 (aged 92); Greenville, South Carolina, United States
- Occupations: Organist, composer
- Spouse: Nancy Powell

Robert J. Powell (July 22, 1932 – January 17, 2025) was an American composer, organist, and choir director.

Powell earned a Bachelor of Music degree from Louisiana State University with a focus on organ and composition. He studied with Alec Wyton at Union Theological Seminary in New York, and he was also Wyton's assistant at The Episcopal Cathedral of St. John the Divine. For three years (1965–1968), he served St. Paul's School (Concord, New Hampshire) as Director of Music. Later, Powell was Director of Music and Organist of Christ Church (Episcopal) of Greenville, South Carolina from 1968 to 2003. He composed in nearly all genres common to church music, including anthems, service music, hymn concertatos, organ music, music for handbell choir, and large-scale oratorios. Powell's conservative, neo-Romantic style stemmed from his practical approach to composition. According to Powell himself, he writes for "choirs of twenty-five because that's what most choirs are. When you come right down to it, most choirs are not of cathedral ability or size. My pieces are all practical things and useful for specific occasions." His publications appear in The Hymnal 1982 as well as in the catalogs of most of the significant American publishers of church music. According to publisher GIA, Powell was "a composer whose output bridges denominational boundaries and who is able to serve the larger Church. He has made ecumenical sharing a reality–-and always with a genteel touch." Powell was an active member of the Association of Anglican Musicians and is a Fellow of the American Guild of Organists.
