= Rob Powell (athlete) =

American athlete and fitness coach

Rob Powell is an American athlete and fitness coach who holds two certified World Fitness Challenge (WFC)/Guinness World Records from 2001 and 2002 and has won the World Fitness/Conditioning Champion title four times (2001, 2002, 2003 and 2004). Powell founded The WFC Workout, The World's Fittest Workout Apps, and retired from competition in 2011.

== Early life ==
Powell grew up on a ranch in Dry Creek, Texas. He graduated from W.H. Ford High School, South Plains College, and Texas Tech University.

== Guinness World Records ==
Guinness World Records uses specific rules and events as the standard set by Rob Powell. Powell's Guinness World Records consist of the following;

1. 2 Mile Swim
2. 12 Mile Run
3. 12 Mile Hike
4. 1,250 Push Ups
5. 1,250 Leg Lifts
6. 1,250 Jumping Jacks
7. 110 Mile Cycling
8. 20 Mile Row
9. 20 Mile Elliptical
10. 3,250 Sit Ups
11. Lift 300,000 Pounds of Weight (upper body only)

== Times ==
1. October 27–28, 2001, 22:11:40 bettering Joe Decker's World Record.
2. October 26–27, 2002, 19:17:38 bettering his own world record by nearly 3 hours.
3. WFC 1, October 25–26, 2003, 18:36:15
4. WFC 2, October 30–31, 2004, 17:45:03

== WFC ==
The World fitness challenge consist of the following activities.

1. 1 Mile Swim
2. 5 Mile Run
3. 5 Mile Hike
4. 250 Pop-Ups
5. 250 Hang Knee Lifts
6. 50 Mile Cycle
7. 10 Mile Row
8. 10 Mile Elliptical
9. 1,500 Crunches
10. 150,000 Pounds Lifted

The World Fitness Championship for (Men Only) is:

1. 2 Mile Swim
2. 10 Mile Run
3. 10 Mile Hike
4. 500 Pop-Ups
5. 500 Hang Knee Lifts
6. 100 Mile Cycle
7. 20 Mile Row
8. 20 Mile Elliptical
9. 3,000 Crunches
10. 300,000 Pounds Lifted
