= Ian Powell (footballer) =

Australian rules footballer

Personal information
- Full name: Ian Powell
- Born: 14 October 1940
- Original team: Heidelberg
- Height: 175 cm (5 ft 9 in)
- Weight: 80 kg (176 lb)

Playing career^{1}
Years	Club	Games (Goals)
1961–63	Fitzroy	15 (0)
- ^{1} Playing statistics correct to the end of 1963.

Ian Powell (born 14 October 1940) is a former Australian rules footballer who played with Fitzroy in the Victorian Football League (VFL).
