= Roy Powell =

Roy Powell may refer to:

- Roy Powell (musician) (born 1965), British jazz pianist
- Roy Powell (rugby league, born 1965) (1965–1998), English rugby league player
- Roy Powell (New Zealand rugby league) (fl. 1930s), New Zealand rugby league player
