= Colin Powell Leadership Academy =

Coordinates: 39°44′30″N 84°13′42″W

- 834 Randolph St. Dayton, Ohio 45408

Information
- Type: Charter
- School district: Colin Powell Leadership Academy School District
- Grades: K-12
- Information: (937) 263-3937

Colin Powell Leadership Academy was a charter school in Dayton, Ohio. The school met one of the 12 state indicators for the 2005–2006 school year, earning it a rating of "Academic Emergency" by the Ohio Department of Education.

This school is closed.
