= Matt Powell =

Welsh rugby union footballer (born 1978)

- Born: Matthew Powell; 8 May 1978 (age 48) Talybont-on-Usk, Powys, Wales
- Height: 5 ft 11 in (1.80 m)
- Weight: 13 st 10 lb (90 kg)

Rugby union career
- Position: Scrum-half
- Current team: Worcester
Senior career
Years	Team	Apps	(Points)
1997–2000	Saracens	5	(10)
2000–2003	Harlequins	25	(5)
2003–2008	Worcester	152	(62)
- Correct as of 5 January 2008

Matthew Powell (born 8 May 1978 in Abergavenny, Wales) is a Welsh rugby union footballer, who played for Worcester Warriors at scrum-half.

Powell was educated at Christ College Brecon and played for the first XV, coached by Jon Williams, between 1994 and 1996. Powell was part of Orchard House and later studied at Brunel University.

He caught the eye of Saracens and played in the same team as Danny Grewcock.

He left Saracens to join Harlequins in June 2000 and played in the Tetley's Bitter Cup final of 2001 against Newcastle Falcons. He played every game on the way to the final.

Powell joined Worcester Warriors in 2003, and in 2007 penned a new three-year deal to commit himself to the club until 2010.

He was involved in the Wales set-up for the last two games of the Six Nations in 2006. His consistent displays were later rewarded with a late call-up to play for the Barbarians in their annual match as a replacement for the former All Black, Justin Marshall. He has also made over 100 appearances in the English elite.

He announced his retirement after the 08–09 season and took up a position in the backroom staff.

Powell is currently Business Development Director at Bath RFC.
