= Governor Powell =

Governor Powell may refer to:

- Clifford Ross Powell (1893–1973), Acting Governor of New Jersey in 1935
- George Gabriel Powell (1710–1779), Acting governor of St Helena from 1742 to 1748
- Lazarus W. Powell (1812–1867), 19th Governor of Kentucky
- Wesley Powell (1915–1981), 70th Governor of New Hampshire
