= Ray Powell (police officer) =

South Yorkshire Police Department officer

- Police career
- Allegiance: United Kingdom
- Department: South Yorkshire Police Service
- Service years: 1984
- Rank: Inspector

Inspector Ray Powell is a senior British Police Officer who held the position of President of the National Black Police Association from September 2003 to November 2005.

Powell joined the South Yorkshire Police Service in 1984, and was based at police headquarters in Snigg Hill, Sheffield, serving for eighteen years and rising to the rank of sergeant before being elected as deputy general secretary of the NBPA in November 2002. Powell subsequently took up the presidency when the previous holder left. In this post he represented 3,000 black staff across the country and helped to formulate policies affecting police forces nationally. At the time of his appointment he said:

My priority is to support the black staff working in the police service throughout the country. The aim of the National Black Police Association is to improve the work situation and the work environment of all black staff by protecting their rights. There is still a massive culture change that has to take place and there are still a lot of issues with staff needing support.'

In October 2003, a month after assuming the presidency, and following the failure of talks over the reinstatement of suspended Superintendent Ali Dizaei, Powell called for a boycott of Metropolitan Police recruitment campaigns, warning that the NBPA could not encourage black and Asian recruits to join a force that practised racial discrimination. Dizaei was subsequently reinstated.

Powell also urged that an undercover BBC reporter who investigated racism among police recruits in Cheshire should not be prosecuted. In the event, the Crown Prosecution Service decided there was insufficient evidence to proceed with the case against the so-called 'secret policeman'.

In August 2004 Powell described complaints from white officers that they had been rejected for promotion in favour of black or Asian officers as 'the whining of a few unsuccessful white officers trying to test the system'. His remark was prompted by the revelation that nearly half the race discrimination cases outstanding against the Met had been brought by white officers. 'If you ask anybody in the police what positive action is,' Powell argued, 'they would not have a clue: therefore they interpret it as positive action against them.'

In March 2005 Powell told Police Review that officers who were 'diversity opportunists' posed as much danger to the service as 'overt' racists. Referring to diversity training, Powell claimed that problem staff in middle management were either 'diversity opportunists' who used diversity training as a 'badge' for their career enhancement, or 'postmodern racists' who would 'use the system' against ethnic minority staff, by only paying lip-service to the diversity agenda.

Powell is currently the Head of Operational Equality Diversity Human Rights for the National Policing Improvement Agency, with the rank of Inspector.

At the time of his appointment as NBPA president, Powell lived in Sheffield and was a married father of two.
