= Charles Powell (historian) =

Spanish-British historian

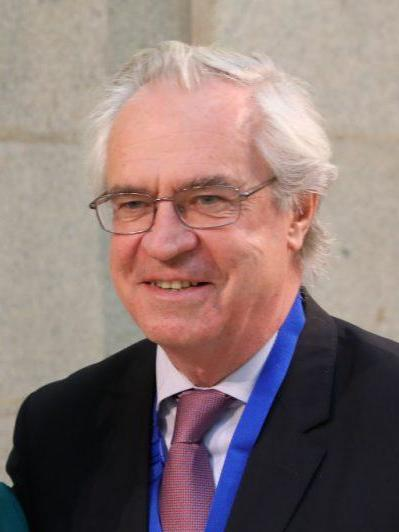
Charles Powell in 2019.

Charles Tito Powell CMG (born 1960) is a Spanish-British historian who studied History and Modern Languages at the University of Oxford. His D.Phil. thesis was on Spain's transition to democracy. He was a Junior Research Fellow at St Antony's College, Oxford, a lecturer in history at Corpus Christi College, Oxford, and a J. A. Pye Research Fellow at University College, Oxford.

On moving to Spain in 1997, he was appointed deputy director of the Ortega y Gasset Foundation's Centro Español de Relaciones Internacionales (CERI). In 2002 he joined the recently created Elcano Royal Institute, Spain's leading international relations think tank, of which he is currently director. Since September of that year he has been Professor of Contemporary Spanish History at the CEU San Pablo University (Madrid). Additionally, in 2007 he took part in the creation of the Fundación Transición Española and was appointed its first director (he is currently its 2nd vice-president).

Powell has published six books and dozens of academic articles, including: El piloto del cambio (Planeta, 1991), a study of the role of the king and the monarchy in Spain's transition to democracy; the biography Juan Carlos of Spain. Self-made monarch (Macmillan, 1996); and España en Democracia, 1975-2000 (Plaza & Janes, 2001), a general history of Spain since Franco's death which is widely regarded as the standard text on the period. His latest book is El Amigo Americano. España y Estados Unidos: de la dictadura a la democracia, a study of Spanish-US relations from Nixon to Reagan (1969-1989), which was published by Galaxia Gutenberg in April 2011.

Over the course of his academic career, he has lectured in over thirty countries in Europe, North and South America, Africa and Asia.

Powell was appointed Companion of the Order of St Michael and St George (CMG) in the 2017 Birthday Honours for services to UK/Spanish relations.
