= Ron Powell =

Welsh footballer

Personal information
- Full name: Ronald William Herbert Powell
- Date of birth: 2 December 1929
- Place of birth: Knighton, Wales
- Date of death: 25 May 1992 (aged 62)
- Place of death: Rossall, England
- Position: Goalkeeper

Senior career*
Years	Team	Apps	(Gls)
?–1948	Knighton Town	?	(?)
1948–1952	Manchester City	12	(0)
1952–1964	Chesterfield	471	(0)
- * Club domestic league appearances and goals

Ronald William Herbert Powell (2 December 1929 – 25 May 1992) was a footballer who played as a goalkeeper in the Football League between 1948 and 1964, and who played over 500 senior games.

He started with his home-town side Knighton Town, before transferring to Manchester City in November 1948, although he did not make his league debut until the following season. All of his appearances for City came in the 1949–50 season, and he was in goals for the short period between the careers of Frank Swift and Bert Trautmann.. However, he only played 13 senior games for City in four years, and in the summer of 1952 he joined Chesterfield.

Powell missed only two league games in his first season with Chesterfield, and he went on to make 471 league appearances for them, and 508 matches in total, in a 12-year career with the club. In 1958 his run of playing 284 consecutive league games for the club was halted when Gordon Banks played. His playing career was ended in December 1964 following a car crash which killed his team-mate Ralph Hunt, and which also injured Doug Wragg and Peter Stringfellow.
