= Brian Powell (sociologist) =

American sociologist

- Born: 1954 (age 71–72)
- Scientific career
- Workplaces: Indiana University

Brian Powell (born 1954) is an American sociologist James H. Rudy professor of sociology at Indiana University. He is known for his works on family, education, gender, and sexuality.
