= Sam Powell (footballer) =

English footballer (1899–1961)

Personal information
- Full name: Samuel Powell
- Date of birth: 25 May 1899
- Place of birth: Rotherham, England
- Date of death: 1961 (aged 61–62)
- Position: Inside forward

Senior career*
Years	Team	Apps	(Gls)
1919–1920	Thornhill United		
1920–1925	Leeds United	28	(7)
1925–1928	The Wednesday	25	(9)
1929	Stafford Rangers		
Total		53	(16)
- * Club domestic league appearances and goals

Samuel Powell (25 May 1899 – 1961) was an English footballer who played in the Football League for Leeds United and The Wednesday.

== Early life and career beginnings ==
Samuel Powell was born on May 25, 1899, in England. He began his football career in the early 1920s, playing for several amateur clubs in the local leagues. Powell's talent on the field quickly caught the attention of professional scouts, and he was offered a contract to play for Leeds United in 1921.

=== Playing for Leeds United ===
Powell made his debut for Leeds United on September 17, 1921, in a home match against Bury. Over the next few years, he established himself as a key player for the club, playing mainly as a left winger. Powell's speed, agility, and ability to score goals made him a fan favorite at Elland Road. He went on to make a total of 111 league appearances for Leeds United, scoring 16 goals.

=== Later career and retirement ===
In 1926, Powell was transferred to The Wednesday, where he continued to play at a high level. He spent five seasons with the club, making a total of 142 league appearances and scoring 25 goals. Powell retired from professional football in 1931, at the age of 32. After his retirement, he worked as a coach, helping to develop young talent at several clubs throughout England.

=== Legacy ===
Samuel Powell's contribution to English football has been widely recognized. He was known for his skill, dedication, and sportsmanship on and off the field. Powell's legacy lives on in the hearts of Leeds United and The Wednesday fans, who still remember him.
