= Hymn concertato =

The Hymn concertato is a genre of hymn arrangement for choir in which varied treatments of stanzas are written out, all based on the familiar tune, and almost always ending with a verse for the congregation to join on. Organ with brass instruments and/or tympani are the usual accompaniment.

The term seems to be American, although the form appears connected to similar works by Vaughan Williams and Holst as well as possibly to the motets in the stile concertato of the 17th-century German composers whose descendants settled in the midwest.

A compilation of examples: https://web.archive.org/web/20070927152719/http://choralnet.org/resources/viewResource.phtml?id=2437&lang=en&category=1
