= Lewis W. Powell =

American lawyer and politician

Lewis W. Powell (October 18, 1882 – May 25, 1942) was an American lawyer and politician.

Born in Kenosha County, Wisconsin, Powell went to Whitewater State Teachers College and to Marquette University Law School. He then practiced law in Kenosha, Wisconsin. Powell served as district attorney of Kenosha County from 1925 to 1929 and was a Republican. He also served on the Kenosha school board and was president of the board. In 1931, Powell served in the Wisconsin State Assembly. Powell died of a heart attack in Kenosha, Wisconsin.
