= Caroline Amelia Powell =

Irish-born American engraver and illustrator (1852–1935)

- Born: 1852; Dublin, Ireland
- Died: 1935 (aged 82–83); Boston, Massachusetts
- Known for: Illustration, Printmaking

Caroline Amelia Powell (1852–1935) was an Irish-born American engraver and illustrator. She was the first woman to become a member of the Society of American Wood Engravers.

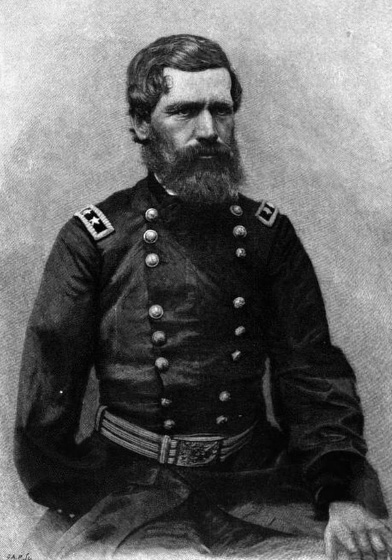
Portrait of Major-General O. O. Howard by Caroline A. Powell

== Biography ==
Powell was born in 1852 in Dublin, Ireland. She studied at Cooper Union and the National Academy of Design, both located in New York City. Her teachers included the engravers William James Linton and Timothy Cole.

Around 1880 Powell's work began appearing in magazines such as The Century Magazine and Scribner's Monthly.

Powell exhibited her work in the Woman's Building at the 1893 World's Columbian Exposition in Chicago, Illinois. She also exhibited at the 1901 Pan-American Exposition in Buffalo, New York.

Powell's wood engravings reproduced art work by her contemporaries including Fritz von Uhde, Abbott H. Thayer, John La Farge, and James Abbott McNeill Whistler. She became the first woman admitted to the Society of American Wood Engravers. As the art of wood engraving fell from use, Powell worked using the halftone process. She worked for 18 years at the Riverside Press, now Riverside Publishing in Cambridge.

Powell died in 1935 in Boston, Massachusetts.
