= John William Powell (politician) =

American politician (1928–2010)

Member of the Mississippi State Senate from the 39th district
- In office January 1960 – January 1988

Personal details
- Born: March 4, 1928 Liberty, Mississippi, US
- Died: November 15, 2010 (aged 82) McComb, Mississippi, US
- Party: Democratic

John William Powell (March 4, 1928 – November 15, 2010) was an American farmer and Democratic politician. He was a member of the Mississippi State Senate from 1960 to 1988.

== Biography ==
John William Powell was born on March 4, 1928, in Liberty, Mississippi. He graduated from Liberty High School and Southwest Mississippi Junior College. He began serving as a Democrat in the Mississippi State Senate in 1960. He continued serving in the Senate until he retired in 1988. He died on November 15, 2010, in McComb, Mississippi.
