= T. G. E. Powell =

British archaeologist

Thomas George Eyre Powell (13 January 1916 – 8 July 1975) was a British archaeologist who specialised in the study of the Neolithic British Isles and the Celts.

== Biography ==
Thomas George Eyre Powell was born in 1916. He was a great-nephew of antiquary George Eyre Evans, and descended from Welsh settlers in Ireland. While studying archaeology at the University of Cambridge, Powell received the nickname Terence, which stuck with him throughout his life. Powell worked in air photographic intelligence for the British in Delhi, India during World War II.

After the war, Powell continued his work with archaeology. In 1948, he was appointed to the Rankin lectureship in Prehistoric Archaeology in the School of Archaeological and Oriental Studies at the University of Liverpool. In March 1948, Powell was elected a Fellow of the Society of Antiquaries of London. Powell specialised in the archaeology of ancient Western Europe, particularly the Neolithic British Isles and the Celts. Along with Glyn Daniel, he conducted pioneering excavations at Barclodiad y Gawres in modern-day Wales. His 1958 book The Celts won him wide renown. Powell (along with Glyn Daniel) excavated the Neolithic passage grave of Barclodiad y Gawres on Anglesey (Ynys Môn), between 1952 and 1953. Barclodiad y Gawres is the only attested example of a cruciform type in North Wales. The monument is one of the most impressive decorated megalithic monuments in north-western Europe. The passage, measuring approximately 6m and leads to a cruciform passage which has a series of uprights decorated with chevrons, lozenges, spirals and zigzag designs. Powell and Daniel excavated much of the passage and chamber areas, along with sections of the mound. The chamber area was once covered by at least several enormous capstones. The chamber and passage architecture prior to excavation was not covered. The forecourt area opens out onto views across the western coast of Anglesey. Within the central chamber was discovered a hearth approximately 1m in diameter which contained a mixture of charcoal and stone chips. A collection of shells, fish bones, and the bones of tiny animals, reptiles, and amphibians were also found.

Powell also excavated Dyffryn Ardudwy in 1973.

From 1970 to 1974, Powell was President of The Prehistoric Society. In 1971, he was appointed Rankin Professor of European Archaeology at the University of Liverpool. Powell died on 8 July 1975.

== Selected works ==
- Barclodiad y Gawres, 1956
- The Celts, 1958
- Prehistoric Art, 'The World of Art Library' series, 1966
- Megalithic Enquiries in the West of Britain, 1969
