= Harry Powell (footballer) =

Australian rules footballer

Personal information
- Full name: Henry Charles Powell
- Born: 22 July 1878; Malvern, Victoria
- Died: 8 June 1930 (aged 51); St Vincent's Hospital, Fitzroy, Victoria
- Original team: Fitzroy Crescent
- Height: 170 cm (5 ft 7 in)
- Weight: 61 kg (134 lb)

Playing career^{1}
Years	Club	Games (Goals)
1901–02	Carlton	8 (0)
- ^{1} Playing statistics correct to the end of 1902.

Henry Powell (22 July 1878 – 8 June 1930) was an Australian rules footballer who played with Carlton in the Victorian Football League (VFL).

Powell was killed in an accident at Croxton railway station in 1930, when he was crushed after falling between the train and the platform.
