= Thomas Powell (botanist) =

British missionary in Samoa (1817–1887)

Thomas Powell FLS
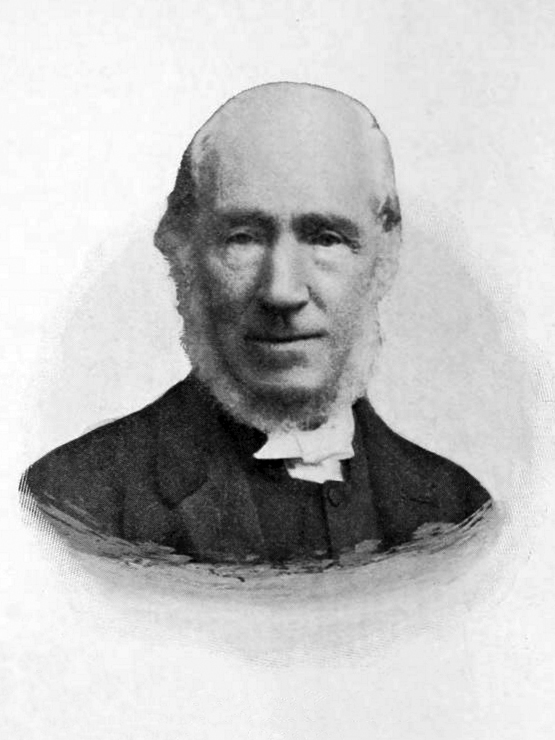
- Thomas Powell, LMS missionary to the islands of Samoa
- Born: 18 June 1817; Cookham Dean, Berkshire, England
- Died: 6 April 1887 (aged 69); Penzance, Cornwall
- Occupations: Missionary, botanist
- Spouse: Jane Emma Harrison

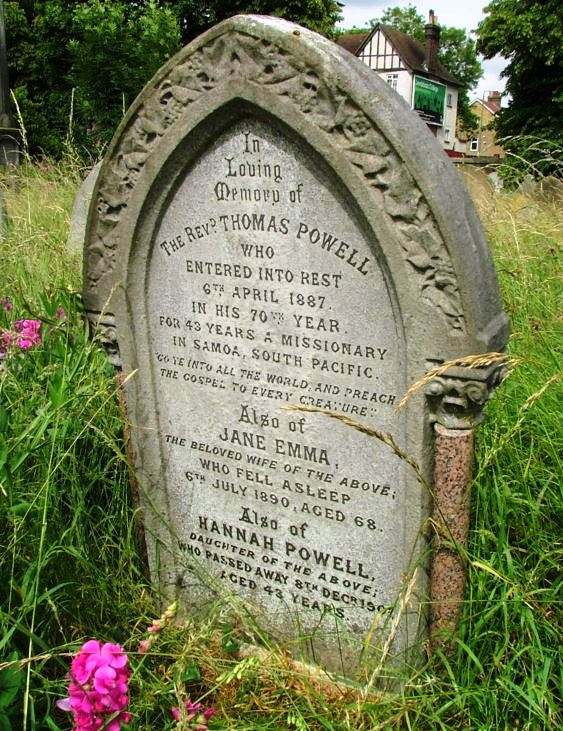
Grave of the Rev. Thomas Powell

Thomas Powell FLS (18 June 1817 – 6 April 1887) was a British missionary sent by the London Missionary Society (LMS) in 1844 to Samoa where he remained for 43 years. He was interested in botany, zoology and anthropology and was elected as a Fellow of the Linnean Society of London. During his time on the islands he recorded details of flora, fauna and the culture of the indigenous people.

== Samoa mission ==
Thomas Powell was born in Cookham Dean, Berkshire and attended Hackney Theological Academy from 1839. He was ordained 29 May 1844 and left London 6 June 1844 with his wife on the inaugural voyage of the missionary barque John Williams. They arrived at the Cape of Good Hope on 24 August; Hobart, Van Dieman's Land on 10 October; Sydney, New South Wales, on 27 October; and Tutuila, Samoa, on 31 January 1845 and Apia, Upolu, Samoa, on 3 February 1845, en route to their posting at Savai'i. In the absence of Archibald Murray from Pago Pago, Tutuila, he took charge of that station, arriving there 13 March 1845.

Powell had little knowledge of the language at this time so his missionary work was initially limited, but he did have medical knowledge and used this to treat those in need. Powell left Pago Pago on 23 July 1846, to take charge of the district around Samata on the western side of Savai'i, from Alexander Chisholm departing for Tahiti. In 1848 he went with John Geddie to Aneityum, in what is now Vanuatu, returning in 1849 in bad health to Samoa. He was suffering from malaria but went against Geddie's wishes. He later wrote that a disagreement had occurred between the missionaries. On his return to Samoa, Powell was stationed at Tutuila where he remained for a large part of his time.

As a botanist, Powell had special interests in bryophytes, fungi and lichens. Herbarium specimens collected by him in the south Pacific region between 1860 and 1890 have been indexed by the Linnean Society of London and a list of the material was published by the society in 2011. This included the distribution of herbarium specimens as part of an exsiccata-like series Mosses of Samoa (c. 1867). He identified many of the Samoan names of plants and his paper on the subject, On Various Samoan Plants and Their Vernacular Names, was published in the 1868 Journal of Botany, British and Foreign, volume 6. Other papers forwarded to the Linnean Society by Powell included details of the poisons used by Samoan islanders to tip arrows and spears. He also submitted a paper on the formation of Atolls. The paper was read, but due to a critical review by Charles Darwin, it was not published.

Powell helped George Pratt compile his dictionary of the Samoan language. He also transcribed the Samoan story of the creation, told to him by a Samoan chief—Taua-nu'u. This is a valuable record of the islanders beliefs before the arrival of the missionaries. In 1886, he published a book called A Manual of Zoology Embracing the Animals of the Scripture, in the Samoan dialect. Many of the animals would have been unknown to the Samoans, so Powell included illustrations where possible. After his death his wife forwarded some of his papers written in Samoan to the Rev. George Pratt in Sydney Australia. Due to failing eyesight Pratt was unable to make use of the works but a colleague, John Fraser, translated the manuscripts of Samoan myths and folks songs and published them in 1896.

His interests extended to ornithology and he corresponded with Philip Sclater, secretary of the Zoological Society of London, sending specimens for identification. These were passed to Osbert Salvin who presented his findings to the Society in a report 6 January 1879.

== Bully Hayes ==
Bully Hayes was a notorious recruiter of native labour in the South Seas using trickery or kidnap. The practice referred to as blackbirding, supplied plantation owners with workers who often never returned to their homeland. In 1872 Hayes was arrested by Captain Meade of the USS Narragansett in Samoa. However, after investigation, he was released due to lack of evidence. Powell, who had tried before to have Hayes prosecuted, wrote:

How is it that with such a mass of evidence as was collected on his detention here, which is in British blue books proving his kidnapping of the people of Manahiki, that he is allowed to go at large?

He had previously written:

It will be a lamentable inconsistency on the parts of the British and French governments if this iniquitous traffic be allowed under their flags after their intervention, only a few years ago to put a stop to Peruvian proceedings of the same character.

Bully Hayes was killed by a crew mate in 1877.

== Family ==
Powell arrived home on furlough in England on 10 May 1885. Though intending to return to Samoa, he died at Penzance, Cornwall, on 6 April 1887. Jane Emma died at Eltham, London, on 6 July 1890, aged 68. They are buried in St John the Baptist Churchyard, Eltham, along with one of their daughters—Hannah. Thomas and Jane Powell had at least seven children; their eldest daughter, Jane Anne (1846–1920), married wealthy James Spicer Jr. (1846–1915), who ran the wholesale paper merchants James Spicer & Sons Limited with his brother Sir Albert Spicer. James Spicer was named as Powell's executor in his will.

== Legacy ==
Plant and animal genera and species named after Thomas Powell:

- Powellia. The genus Powellia is in the family Racopilaceae.
- Clytorhynchus vitiensis powelli (Pinarolestes powelli), or Manu'a shrikebill, described and named by Osbert Salvin in 1879
- Faradaya powellii, named by Berthold Carl Seemann
- Trichomanes powellii, described by John Gilbert Baker
- Asplenium powellii, described by John Gilbert Baker
- Phymatosorus powellii (Polypodium powellii) described by John Gilbert Baker
- Clinostigma powelliana, described by Odoardo Beccari

== Publications ==
- Powell, Thomas (1868). Seemann, Berthold (ed.). "On Various Samoan Plants and Their Vernacular Names". The Journal of Botany, British and Foreign. 6. London: L. Reeve and Co.: 342 – via BHL.
- Powell, Thomas (May 1877). "On the Nature and Mode of Use of the Vegetable Poisons Employed by the Samoan Islanders". Botanical Journal of the Linnean Society. 16 (89): 55–60. doi:10.1111/j.1095-8339.1877.tb00171.x.
- Powell, Thomas (28 May 1881). "Correspondence: Palolo". The Samoa Times and South Sea Gazette. Vol. 4, no. 199. p. 2.
- Powell, Thomas (11 June 1881). "Erata: Palolo". The Samoa Times and South Sea Gazette. Vol. 4, no. 201. p. 2.
- Powell, Thomas (1886). O le tala i tino o tagata ma mea ola eseese; e i ai foi o tala i manu ua ta'ua i le tusi paia. A Manual of Zoology; Embracing the Animals of Scripture; in the Samoan Dialect. Chilworth and London: Unwin Brothers.
- Powell, Thomas (1887). "A Samoan Tradition of the Creation and Deluge". Journal of the Transactions of the Victoria Institute, or Philosophical Society of Great Britain. 20. London: Victoria Institute: 145–172 – via BHL.
- Powell, Thomas (1887). "Description of the Samoan Islands". Journal of the Transactions of the Victoria Institute, or Philosophical Society of Great Britain. 20. London: Victoria Institute: 173–175 – via BHL.
- Powell, Thomas (1892). Fraser, John (ed.). "The Samoan Story of Creation: A 'Tala'". Journal of the Polynesian Society. 1 (3). Translated by Pratt, George. Wellington: The Polynesian Society: 164–189 – via ISTA.
