= Francis Powell (priest) =

Francis David Claude Powell (1909–1998) was the dean of Belize from 1965 to 1969.

Powell was educated at Leeds University and the College of the Resurrection, Mirfield. He was ordained deacon in 1933 and priest in 1934. After curacies in Tunbridge Wells and Pimlico he was a chaplain in the RNVR during World War II. When peace returned he was a missionary in the Diocese of Masisi before his time as Dean and vicar of St Matthew, Hammersmith afterwards. He was also Dean of Belize, from 1965 to 1969. He is buried at St Andrew, Walberswick.
