= Senator Powell (disambiguation) =

Lazarus W. Powell (1812–1867) was a U.S. Senator from Kentucky from 1859 to 1865. Senator Powell may also refer to:

- Beverly Powell (born 1951), Texas State Senate
- Clifford Ross Powell (1893–1973), New Jersey State Senate
- E. Henry Powell (1839–1911), Vermont State Senate
- Eric Powell (politician) (born 1966), Mississippi State Senate
- Jeremiah Powell (fl. 1780s), Massachusetts State Senate
- Larry Powell (Kansas politician) (born 1939), Kansas State Senate
- Max L. Powell (1869–1941), Vermont State Senate
- Walter E. Powell (1931–2020), Ohio State Senate

== See also ==
- John Hare Powel (1786–1856), Pennsylvania
