= E. Alexander Powell =

American war correspondent and author

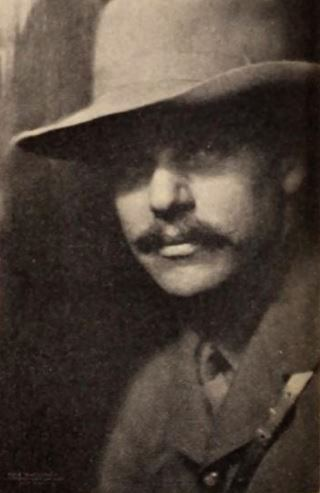
Powell in a 1920 magazine

Edward Alexander Powell (August 16, 1879 – November 13, 1957) was an American war correspondent during World War I and author.

== Biography ==
Powell was born in Syracuse, New York in 1879. In 1898–1899 he worked for the Syracuse Journal, and in 1902 he became editor of Craftsman. From 1903 to 1904 he was an advertising manager for the Smith Premier Typewriter Company, based in London, England, and in 1905-1906 he worked in the Near East as a correspondent for British and American publications. From 1906 to 1909 he was a consular official in Syria and Egypt.

Powell worked as a war correspondent during World War I and his position as a neutral allowed him access to both sides of the battle lines, from 1914 onwards. With the entry of the United States into the Great War in 1917, Powell was commissioned as a captain in military intelligence. He was injured in September 1918, and convalesced until the Armistice in November of that year, thereafter returning to the US. He left the US Armed Services with the rank of major. Powell published his war journalism in newspapers and magazines such as The War Illustrated, New York World and the Daily Mail and his war books were published by Charles Scribner's Sons.

Powell then switched from journalism to a successful career as an adventure and travel writer, traveling widely across the globe and publishing some 20 more books between 1920 and 1954.

Powell married Jessie Northrup Powell, then subsequently Florence Taylor Powell. He died at Falls Village, Connecticut in 1957. His papers are held in the US Library of Congress.

== Bibliography ==
- 1909 The Romance of the Missionary
- 1912 The Last Frontier: The White Man's War for Civilisation in Africa (travel and adventure)
- 1913 Gentlemen Rovers (American history)
- 1914 Fighting in Flanders (World War I, Belgium)
- 1914 The End of the Trail: The Far West from New Mexico to British Columbia (travel and adventure)
- 1914 The Beckoning Land
- 1915 The Road to Glory (American history)
- 1915 Vive la France! (World War I, France)
- 1916 Italy at War (World War I, Italy)
- 1917 Brothers in Arms (World War I, US)
- 1917 The Army Behind the Army (World War I, US)
- 1918 Making the Makers of Victory: Camp Lewis - the Camp of the Frontier
- 1920 The New Frontiers of Freedom: From the Alps to the Aegean (travel and adventure)
- 1921 Where the Strange Trails Go Down: Sulu, Borneo, Celebes, Bali, Java, Sumatra, Straits Settlements, Malay States, Siam, Cambodia, Annam, Cochin China (travel and adventure)
- 1922 Asia at the Crossroads: Japan, Korea, China, Philippine Islands (world politics)
- 1922 Some Forgotten Heroes and Their Place in American History (American history)
- 1923 By Camel and Car to the Peacock Throne (travel and adventure)
- 1923 The Struggle for Power in Muslim Asia (world politics)
- 1924 A Virginia Pilgrimage
- 1925 Beyond the Utmost Purple Rim: Abyssinia, Somaliland, Kenya Colony, Zanzibar, The Comoros, Madagascar (travel and adventure)
- 1925 The Map That is Half Unrolled: Equatorial Africa from the Indian Ocean to the Atlantic (travel and adventure)
- 1925 Below the Line
- 1926 In Barbary: Tunisia, Morocco and the Sahara (travel and adventure)
- 1927 The Danger on the Danube (world politics)
- 1928 Embattled Borders: Eastern Europe from the Balkans to the Baltic (world politics)
- 1929 The Last Home of Mystery: Adventures in Nepal Together with Accounts of Ceylon, British India, the Native States, the Persian Gulf, the Overland Desert Mail and the Baghdad Railway (travel and adventure)
- 1931 Marches of the North: from Cape Breton to the Klondike (travel and adventure)
- 1931 Thunder over Europe (world politics)
- 1931 D.M.
- 1932 Undiscovered Europe (travel and adventure)
- 1932 Yonder Lies Adventure! (travel and adventure)
- 1933 Slanting Lines of Steel (World War I, adventures of a war correspondent)
- 1934 The Long Roll on the Rhine
- 1935 Red Drums
- 1936 Aerial odyssey: Cuba, Haiti, Dominican republic, Porto Rico, ... (travel and adventure)
- 1937 Free Lance (autobiography)
- 1938 Gone Are the Days
- 1954 Adventure Road (autobiography)
