= Arthur E. Powell =

Welsh theosophist (1882–1969)

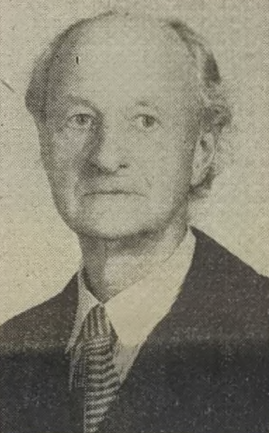
- Born: Arthur Edward Powell; 27 September 1882; Montgomeryshire
- Died: 20 March 1969 (aged 86); California
- Occupation: Writer

Arthur Edward Powell (27 September 1882 – 20 March 1969) was a Welsh Theosophist whose books were published beginning in the early 1900s. He studied the major esoteric works of Helena Blavatsky, Charles Webster Leadbeater and Annie Besant.

== Biography ==
Powell was born at 'Plas-y-Bryn', a house located in Llanllwchiairn (near Newtown), Montgomeryshire, Wales. His parents were Edward Powell (1850–1918) and Mary Eleanor Pughe Pryce-Jones (1859–1944), who married on June 3, 1880. His father Edward was a solicitor, and Chairman of the Board and Managing Director of the Humber-Hillman Company (an automobile manufacturer). Powell was a lieutenant in the Royal Engineers.

He married his first wife Hilda Hodgson-Smith in 1909. Powell and his wife Hilda were theosophists who attended meetings with Annie Besant in London. His wife also lectured for the Theosophical Society on the topic of psychic ability to find fairies and gnomes. Their son was born in 1911. He married his second wife Winifred May Fenwick in 1935. They resided in Hollywood, Los Angeles.

He died in Los Angeles, California in 1969.

== Vegetarianism ==
Powell was a vegetarian. He authored Food And Health in 1909. Powell promoted abstinence from alcohol, coffee, meat, tea and tobacco. His book Food And Health was negatively reviewed in the British Medical Journal as biased and supporting food faddism. The review noted that Powell "uses quotations from standard medical authors when they can be made to serve his purpose, although they repudiate the conclusions he arrives".

A review of Food And Health in The Lancet suggested that "Lieutenant Powell spoils his own cause, a cause with which we have no quarrel, by attempting to support it by disquisitions on the ethics of killing animals". Other reviews were more positive, for example the Western Daily Press concluded that "whether the views of the author be accepted or not, the volume will found both interesting and informing". The Edinburgh Evening News described the book as "a very ably stated exposition in favour of vegetarianism as a remedy for all the ills that flesh is heir to".

== Selected publications ==
- Food and Health (1909)
- The Etheric Double (1925)
- The Astral Body and Other Astral Phenomena (1927)
- The Mental Body (1927)
- The Causal Body And The Ego (1928)
- The Solar System (1930)
- Human Astral Entities
- The Mastery of Emotion
- Astral Death
- Clairvoyance in Space and Time
- Kundalini
- The Fourth Dimension
- Rebirth
- Discipleship
- Chakras
- The Development of Astral Powers
- Sleep-life
- Dreams
- Invisible Helpers
- The Astral Plane
- Non-human Astral Entities
- Thought Forms
- The Magic of Freemasonry
- Spiritualism
- The Work of a Lodge of the Theosophical Society
