= General Powell (disambiguation) =

General Powell frequently refers to Colin Powell (1937–2021), a US Army four-star General and US Secretary of State. It may also refer to:

- Henry Watson Powell (1733–1814), British Army general
- Herbert B. Powell (1903–1998), US Army general
- Kenneth R. Powell (1915–1987), US Air Force Major General
- Roger Powell (general) (born 1949), Australian Army Major General
- William G. Powell (1871–1955), U.S. Marine Corps Major General
- William Henry Powell (soldier) (1825–1904), Union brigadier general in the American Civil War

== See also ==
- Donald Powell (1896–1942), who served in the British India Army and was awarded the D.S.O., achieving a final rank of Brigadier (British non-general field rank)
- Robert Baden-Powell, 1st Baron Baden-Powell (1857–1941), British Army Lieutenant General who founded the Scouting Movement
- Powell (disambiguation)
- General (disambiguation)
