= Israel Wood Powell (British Columbia politician) =

Canadian politician (1836–1915)

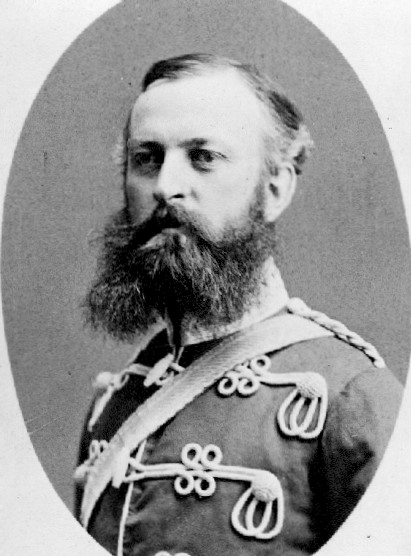

1st Superintendent of Indian Affairs for British Columbia
- In office 1872–1889

Member of the House of Assembly of Vancouver Island
- In office 1863–1866

Personal details
- Born: April 27, 1836 Colborne, Ontario, Upper Canada
- Died: February 25, 1915 (aged 78) Victoria, British Columbia, Canada
- Spouse: Jane "Jennie" Brank.
- Parents: Israel Wood Powell (father); Melinda Boss (mother)
- Education: McGill University
- Occupation: Businessman, Doctor, Politician, Freemason

Israel Wood Powell (April 27, 1836 – February 25, 1915) was British Columbia's first superintendent of Indian Affairs and a businessman, politician and doctor. He served in the Legislative Assembly of Vancouver Island from 1863 to 1866.

== Life ==
Powell was born in Colborne, Norfolk County, Upper Canada (what is now the Province of Ontario), the son of politician Israel Wood Powell and Melinda Boss. His brother Walker later served in the legislative assembly for the Province of Canada. Powell was educated in Port Dover and at McGill University, where he studied medicine. He returned to Port Dover and set up practice, but relocated in 1862 to the City of Victoria, then part of the Colony of Vancouver Island.

Powell became surgeon for the Victoria Fire Department, and served in the militia. He was elected in 1863 to the House of Assembly of Vancouver Island. He was defeated when he ran for election in 1866 and the 1868 BC elections. In 1865, he married Jane "Jennie" Brank. From 1867 to 1869 he served as Chairman of the General Board of Education.

He was a supporter of union with Canada and brought the first Canadian flag to BC on June 17, 1871 which he presented to the Victoria Fire Department on July 1st. He had received the flag from his close friend and fellow Mason The Right Honourable Sir John A. Macdonald, Prime Minister of Canada.

Powell was a founding member on October 21, 1871 of The Most Worshipful Grand Lodge of Ancient Free and Accepted Masons of British Columbia, as its first Grand Master.

After BC joined Canada in 1871, he was named Superintendent of Indian Affairs, a role which he held from 1872 to 1889. Powell was consistent in his expressed goal of assimilation of Indigenous peoples into Colonial society. He was a constant critic of the provincial government's resistance to providing Indigenous people with land and water rights, and fought for the establishment of Indian Reserves.

During his tenure, he oversaw the removal of Indigenous children from their homes to be sent to residential schools, and the banning of Indigenous languages and customs. He was particularly known for working to subvert communal ownership and the potlatch, a ceremony at the core of west-coast Indigenous culture, and in 1884 he succeeded in having the Indian Act amended to outlaw it. When the first prosecutions under the act failed, Powell counselled the agents under him to dissuade indigenous peoples from potlatching, but not prosecute.

Powell was retired from the superintendent's position in 1889 on the grounds of ill health.

=== Residential schools ===
Early in his career as superintendent, Powell took up the cause of what he viewed as the imperative to educate and “civilize” Indigenous children. Powell focused on the importance of establishing industrial education schools in isolated areas to turn Indigenous children into what he referred to as “useful members of society.”

He sought to establish several boarding schools across the province and particularly pushed for creating the Kamloops Indian Residential School in 1890 to address communities in the province's interior. The school became one of the largest residential schools operated by Indian Affairs.

=== Lot 450 and Tla'amin people ===
The 2778-acre parcel of land known as Lot 450, situated on traditional Tla’amin, Klahoose, and Homalco territories and encompassing several traditional villages and seasonal sites, continues to be a site of contention dating from when land speculator and Victoria politician Robert Paterson Rithet purchased the timber lease under “dubious circumstances” in 1874.

Tla’amin expressed concerns over potential logging and industrialization around their villages to Indian land commissioner Gilbert Malcolm Sproat, who agreed that the government should cease sales activities of the Tla’amin territory until official surveys could be made of their reserves, but when Sproat brought these complaints forward to Powell, the Superintendent was dismissive of Sproat and Tla’amin's concerns and dissuaded the commissioner from visiting Tla’amin to attempt a compromise. The matter was left unresolved.

=== Later life ===
In 1886, Powell became the first president of the Medical Council of British Columbia. He was also the first chancellor for the University of British Columbia. Powell died in Victoria at the age of 78.

== Legacy ==
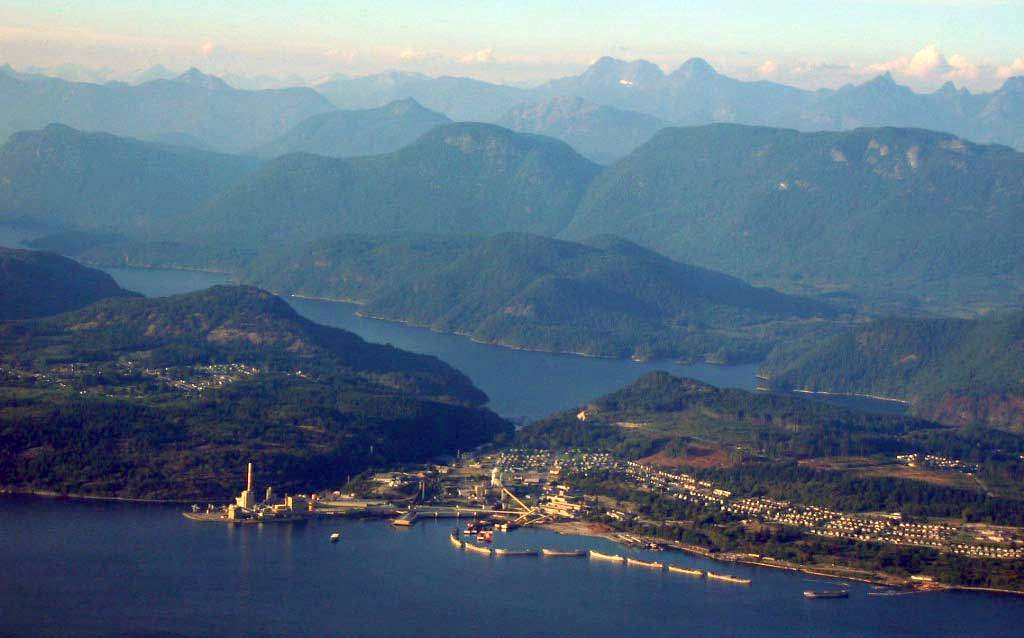
Powell River in 2004

A number of geographical features of British Columbia, including the river and eponymous city of Powell River and Powell Lake, were named in his honour.

In May 2021, the Tla'amin Nation submitted a request to Powell River city council to change the city's name to replace or omit Powell's. In May of 2024 a spokesperson for the joint working group for Powell River’s possible name change, an adjunct professor at UBC, stated: "three years since Tla’amin Nation’s efforts first began, and there’s not much to show for it in a way of tangible change."

Vancouver Island University has since changed the name of their campus in the qathet region to tiwšɛmawtxw (tyew-shem-out), which means house of learning; the name was a gift to the institution from the Tla’amin Nation Executive Council to acknowledge VIU's "readiness and willingness to participate and engage in meaningful reconciliation."

On June 10, 2021, in light of the finding of unmarked gravesites and the remains of 215 children at the former Kamloops Indian Residential School, of which Powell was a leading proponent of its creation, the City of Victoria announced the cancellation of its upcoming Canada Day festivities. An alternative broadcast was proposed in collaboration with local First Nations to "[explore] what it means to be Canadian, in light of recent events."

On July 25, 2022, the regional hospital serving the catchment including the City of Powell River changed its name from 'Powell River General Hospital' to 'qathet General Hospital' at the request of the Tla'amin First Nation.

In May 2024, on the third anniversary of Beaulieu's survey, Tkʼemlúps te Secwépemc issued a statement that referred to the 215 suspected burial sites as "anomalies" rather than "children", which was used in its 2021 statement.

== See also ==
- Powell (surname) (disambiguation)
