= Irish patrol vessel Muirchú =

Irish naval vessel formerly in British service

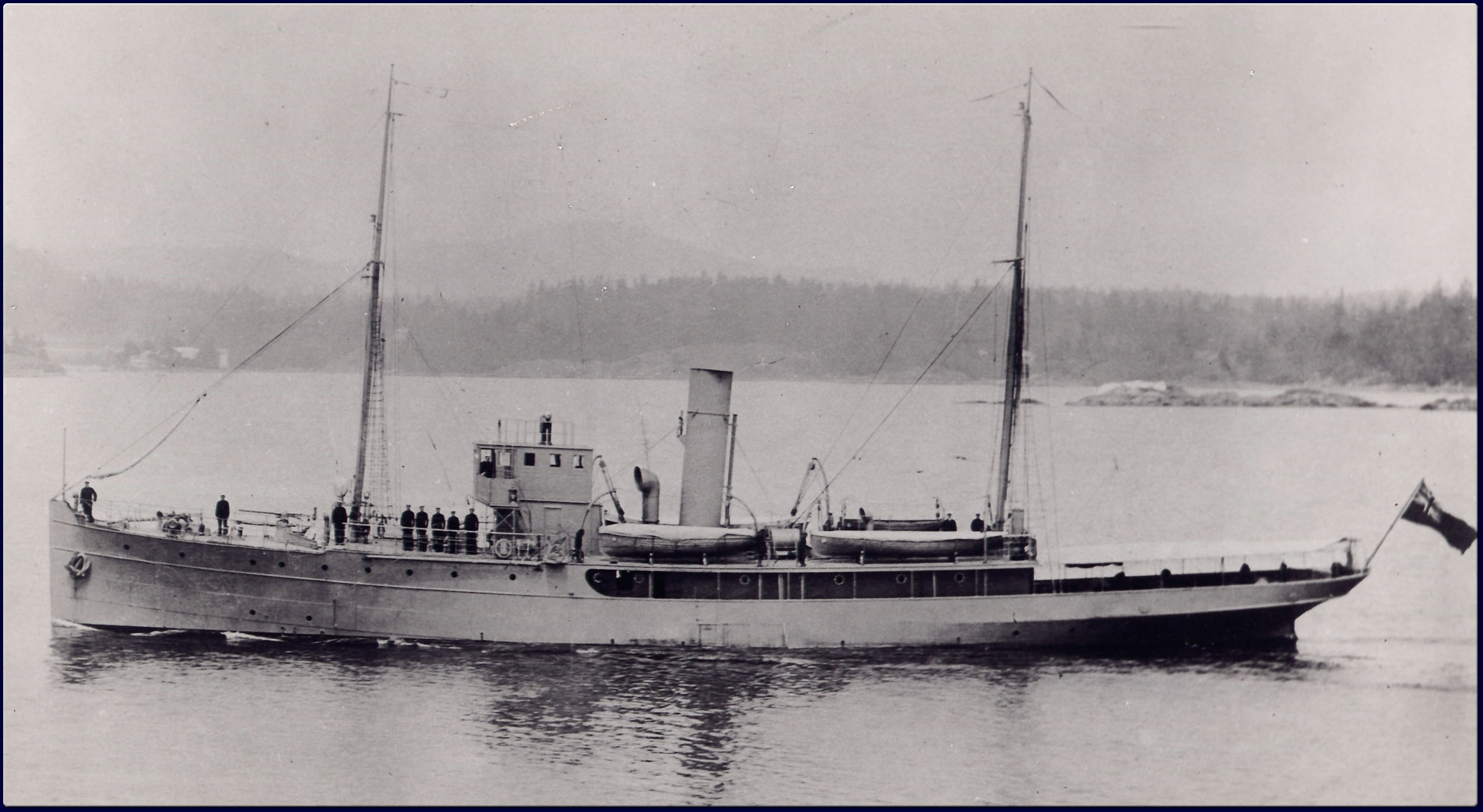
- HMCS Malaspina of the same design as the Muirchu

History

United Kingdom of Great Britain and Ireland
- Name: Helga II
- Builder: Dublin Liffey Dockyard
- Launched: 1908
- Christened: 1908
- Completed: July 1908
- Commissioned: 1915
- Renamed: Helga 1915
- Fate: Passed to Irish Free State

Ireland
- Name: Muirchú
- Namesake: Irish: Hound of the Sea
- Acquired: 1923
- Commissioned: August 1923
- Decommissioned: 1947
- Renamed: August 1923
- Reclassified: 1923
- Fate: Sold to Hammond Lane Scrap Merchants Dublin, sank on delivery voyage.

General characteristics
- Type: Steam yacht
- Displacement: 323 tons
- Length: 155 ft (47 m)
- Armament: as built: QF 3-pounder Hotchkiss gun; later: 2 x QF 12 pounder 12 cwt naval gun

Public Armed Ship Muirchú (Irish: [ˈmˠɪɾʲxuː]) was a ship in the service of Irish Free State's Coastal and Marine Service (CMS). She was the former Royal Navy ship HMY Helga and was involved in shelling Liberty Hall in Dublin from the River Liffey with her pair of 12-pounder naval guns during the Easter Rising of 1916.

Helga was purchased by the Irish Free State in 1923 and renamed Muirchú, 'Hound of the Sea'.

She sank off the Wexford coast after disposal in 1947. The wheel was recovered from the wreck by local divers and can now be seen in Kehoes Pub in Kilmore Quay.

The prefix LÉ is sometimes mistakenly used with Muirchú. The prefix was introduced in December 1946 when the Irish Naval Service was established with the purchase of three corvettes from the Royal Navy replacing Muirchú.

== Career ==
=== UK career ===
She was built in Liffey Dockyard in 1908 as a fishery research and protection cruiser and was named Helga II. Such was interest in her design that Canada ordered two ships to the same specification (HMCS Galiano and HMCS Malaspina).

She was then under control of the Department of Agriculture and Technical Instruction for Ireland until she was taken over by the Admiralty in March 1915 when she became officially described as His Majesty's Yacht Helga, an armed steam yacht – officially an "Armed Auxiliary Patrol Yacht". At this time the "II" was dropped from her name and she served as an anti-submarine patrol vessel as well as undertaking escort duty in the Irish Sea.

During the Easter Rising of April 1916, Helga shelled several areas around Dublin under rebel control, including Liberty Hall and Sackville Street. In April 1918 she was credited with the sinking of a submarine off the Isle of Man and for the remainder of her career she carried a star on her funnel as an indicator of this, even though no submarine was recorded as being sunk in the area at that time.

In October of the same year RMS Leinster was torpedoed off the Kish and 517 were lost. Helga was fuelling in Dún Laoghaire at the time. She rescued ninety of the passengers. Helga was released from the navy in March 1919 and returned to fisheries work. She was later used to transport Royal Irish Constabulary special constables known as Black and Tans around the coast when many of the roads in Ireland were rendered impassable by the IRA in the War of Independence.

=== Irish service ===
Helga was handed over to the Irish Free State in August 1923 and was renamed Muirchú. She thus became one of the first ships in the newly established Coastal and Marine Service. She was commandeered in July 1922 by the government and used against anti-treaty forces in Munster.

However, in the following year the vessel was returned to the Department of Agriculture and Fisheries to carry on her task of fishery protection. It was not until the actual day on which the Second World War was declared that the Marine and Coastwatching Service was established and on 12 December 1939 Muirchú was taken over by this Service from the Department of Agriculture and Fisheries.

Muirchú was sold to Hammond Lane Foundry by the Irish Government, and while on passage to Dublin on 8 May 1947 she sank off the Saltee Islands – though not before her crew safely evacuated.

== Bibliography ==
- Zolandez, Thomas (2004). "Question 42/99: Irish Gunboat Muirchu". Warship International. XLI (4): 348–349. ISSN 0043-0374.
