= Beartooth Mountain (British Columbia) =

Mountain in British Columbia, Canada

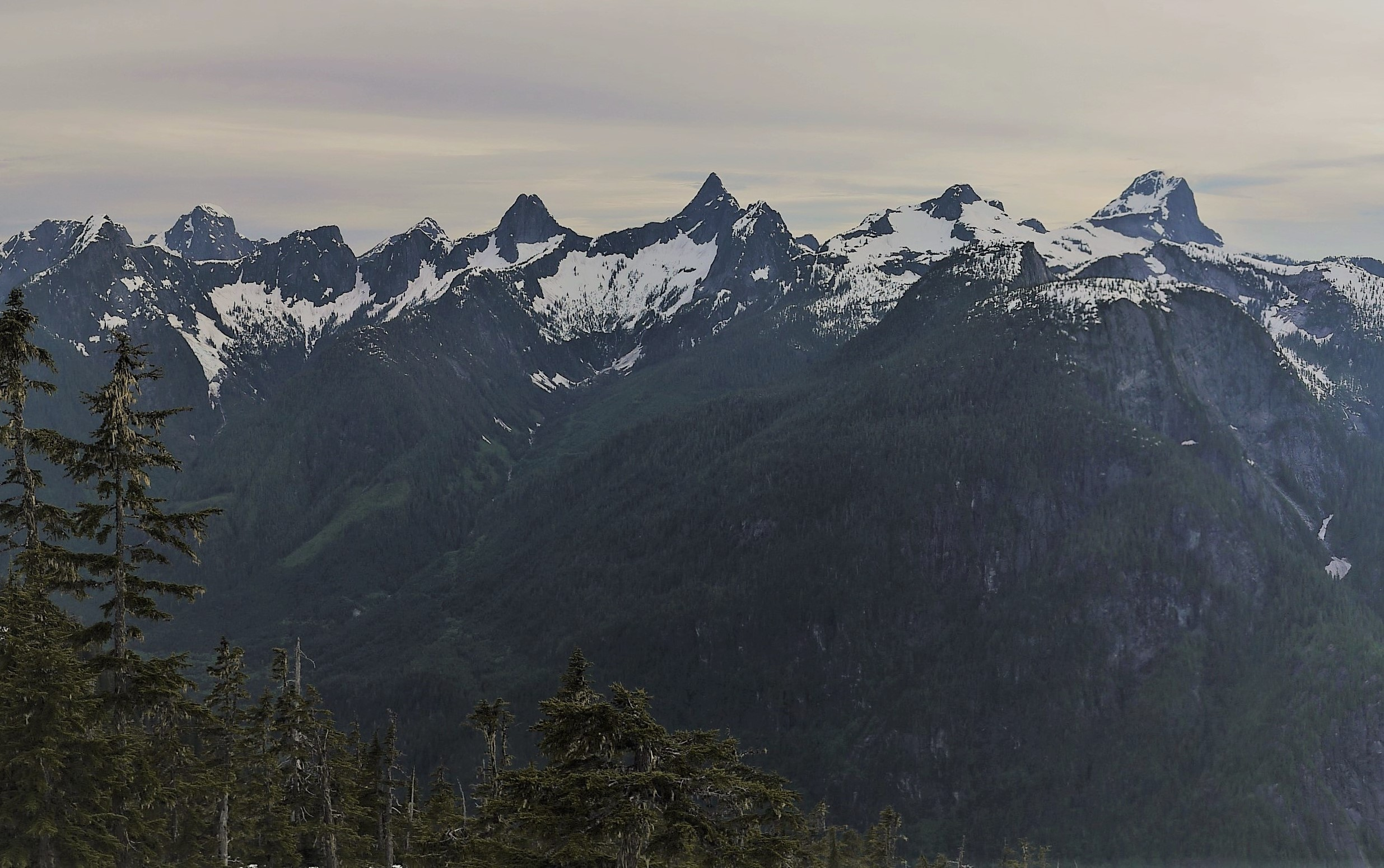
- East aspect, the sharp peak centered

Highest point
- Elevation: 1,903 m (6,243 ft)
- Prominence: 546 m (1,791 ft)
- Parent peak: Slide Mountain (2,105 m)
- Isolation: 7.56 km (4.70 mi)
- Listing: Mountains of British Columbia
- Coordinates: 50°06′19″N 124°17′35″W

Geography
- Location within British Columbia Location within Canada
- Interactive map of Beartooth Mountain
- Location: British Columbia, Canada
- District: New Westminster Land District
- Parent range: Coast Mountains
- Topo map: NTS 92K1 Powell Lake

Beartooth Mountain is a 1,903-metre (6,243-foot) mountain summit located in British Columbia, Canada.

== Description ==
Beartooth Mountain is situated east of Powell Lake in the Coast Mountains, in a remote wilderness area that few visit. The spire-like mountain is set 32 km (20 mi) northeast of the community of Powell River and 130 km (81 mi) northwest of Vancouver. Precipitation runoff from Beartooth drains to Powell Lake, thence Strait of Georgia. Topographic relief is significant as the summit rises 1,360 meters (4,462 feet) above Beartooth Creek in two kilometers (1.2 mile).

== History ==
The mountain was named by Buck Bradburn who lived at the mouth of Siwash Creek, across Powell Lake. The landform's toponym was officially adopted April 6, 1950, by the Geographical Names Board of Canada.

To the local Tla'amin people, the iconic mountain is known as kwɛymamin, and it plays the central part in the Tla'amin Flood creation story of their culture.

== Climate ==
Based on the Köppen climate classification, Beartooth Mountain is located in a marine west coast climate zone of western North America. Most weather fronts originate in the Pacific Ocean, and travel east toward the Coast Mountains where they are forced upward by the range (Orographic lift), causing them to drop their moisture in the form of rain or snowfall. As a result, the Coast Mountains experience high precipitation, especially during the winter months in the form of snowfall. Temperatures can drop below −20 °C with wind chill factors below −30 °C.

== See also ==
- Geography of British Columbia
- Sunshine Coast
