= Israel Wood Powell =

Israel Wood Powell may refer to:

- Israel Wood Powell (Province of Canada politician)
- Israel Wood Powell (British Columbia politician)
