= Harwood Island =

Harwood Island may refer to:

- Harwood Island (British Columbia), the former name of Ahgykson, a small island off the coast of Powell River, BC
- Harwood Island (New South Wales), an island in the Clarence River
