= Slide Mountain (Coast Mountains) =

Mountain in British Columbia, Canada

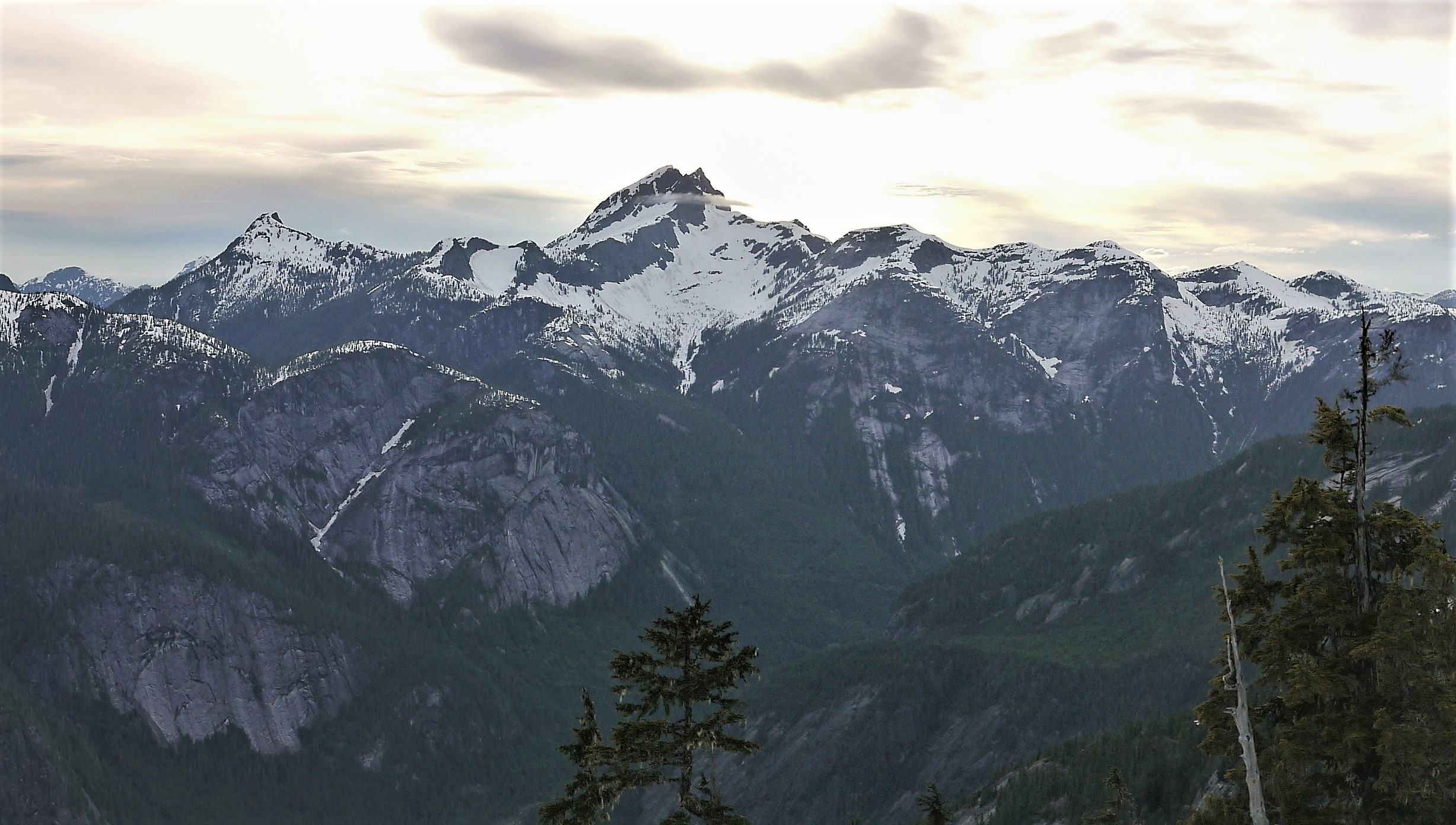
- East aspect

Highest point
- Elevation: 2,105 m (6,906 ft)
- Prominence: 1,052 m (3,451 ft)
- Parent peak: Mount Alfred (2,420 m)
- Isolation: 14.23 km (8.84 mi)
- Listing: Mountains of British Columbia
- Coordinates: 50°10′23″N 124°17′57″W

Geography
- Location within British Columbia Location within Canada
- Interactive map of Slide Mountain
- Location: British Columbia, Canada
- District: New Westminster Land District
- Parent range: Coast Mountains
- Topo map: NTS 92K1 Powell Lake

Climbing
- First ascent: 1942

Slide Mountain is a 2,105-metre (6,906-foot) summit located in British Columbia, Canada.

== Description ==
Slide Mountain is situated in the Coast Mountains, east of Powell Lake and 8 km (5.0 mi) north of Beartooth Mountain. The prominent mountain is set 40 km (25 mi) north-northeast of the community of Powell River and 135 km (84 mi) northwest of Vancouver. Precipitation runoff from the peak drains west to Powell Lake and east to the Eldred River, thence Powell Lake. Topographic relief is significant as the summit rises 2,000 meters (6,560 feet) above the lake in four kilometers (2.5 miles). The first ascent of the summit was made in 1942 by Ian Kay.

== Climate ==
Based on the Köppen climate classification, Slide Mountain is located in a marine west coast climate zone of western North America. Most weather fronts originate in the Pacific Ocean, and travel east toward the Coast Mountains where they are forced upward by the range (Orographic lift), causing them to drop their moisture in the form of rain or snowfall. As a result, the Coast Mountains experience high precipitation, especially during the winter months in the form of snowfall. Winter temperatures can drop below −20 °C with wind chill factors below −30 °C.

== See also ==
- Geography of British Columbia
