= Goat Island (British Columbia) =

Island in Canada

- Location in British Columbia

Geography
- Location: Powell Lake
- Coordinates: 50°02′50″N 124°26′46″W
- Area: 67.4 km^{2} (26.0 sq mi)
- Highest elevation: 1,320 m (4330 ft)
- Highest point: Goat Island Peak

Administration
- Canada
- Province: British Columbia
- Regional District: qathet

Goat Island is a lake island in Powell Lake in the Sunshine Coast region of British Columbia, Canada.

== Geography ==
Goat Island was formed following the damming of the Powell River and subsequent flooding of the valleys surrounding the island. The island has an approximate total area of 67.4 km^{2} (26.0 mi^{2}) and features three small island lakes: Clover Lake, Frogpond Lake, and Spire Lake. The highest point on the island is Goat Island Peak with an approximate elevation of 1,320 m (4,330 ft) above sea level.

The forest on the island has been extensively logged for timber, leaving a relatively young second-growth forest in its place.
