= SS Peralta =

Concrete ship

Coordinates: 49°51′43.9″N 124°33′13.5″W

History
- Name: Peralta
- Owner: USSB (1919–1924); Peralta Portland Cement Company (1924–Sept. 1926); Ocean Industries, Inc. (Sept. 1926–1930); Sea Food Packing Corp. (1930–); Unknown shipyard (–1932); Elwyn C. Hale (1932–1958); Presbytery of San Francisco (1958); MacMillan Bloedel (1958–); Catalyst Paper (–current)
- Builder: San Francisco Shipbuilding Company, Oakland, California
- Cost: $1,788,960.88 ($32.8 million in 2025)
- Launched: October 26, 1920
- Reclassified: Reduction fishery barge in 1924; Sardine cannery barge in 192; Breakwater in 1958
- Identification: Hull number 1662; Official number 221030; Code letters MCKG
- Fate: Floating breakwater, potential reef

General characteristics
- Type: Design 1100 concrete tanker
- Tonnage: 6,149 GRT; 3,701 NRT; 7,500 DWT (Note: The designed deadweight. In practice, the DWT was as low as 6,380 DWT.)
- Length: 434 ft 3 in (132.36 m) (o/a); 420.0 ft (128.0 m) (p/p)
- Beam: 54.0 ft (16.5 m)
- Draft: 26.0 ft (7.9 m)
- Depth: 36.0 ft (11.0 m)
- Decks: One
- Installed power: Three Foster boilers fueled by an oil bunker of 278,655 US gal (1,054,820 L; 232,029 imp gal) capacity
- Propulsion: Llewellyn three-cylinder triple-expansion steam engine; 359 nhp; 2,800 ihp (2,100 kW)
- Speed: 10.5 kn (19.4 km/h; 12.1 mph)
- Range: 6,000 mi (9,700 km) cruising radius
- Capacity: 2,477,000 US gal (9,380,000 L; 2,063,000 imp gal)
- Crew: 41

SS Peralta is a concrete-hulled tanker currently serving as a floating breakwater in the Powell River in British Columbia. Originally built as part of the World War I Emergency Fleet, she was the last of the Shipping Board's twelve concrete ships that finished construction. After her launch, she was mothballed for a time before being scrapped, then served as a reduction fishery and sardine cannery before eventually being purchased for her current service as a breakwater. She is the sister ship to the SS Palo Alto.

== History ==
The SS Peralta was built by the San Francisco Shipbuilding Company at Government Island in Oakland, California as part of the World War I Emergency Fleet. Once the armistice was signed, any Emergency Fleet ships not well underway were canceled, making the Peralta the last of twelve concrete ships to have her work continued. Her name was Twilight before being renamed to Peralta. The ship's keel was laid on October 10, 1918; she was launched on October 26, 1920; she received her documents around the same time; and she was delivered in February 1921. She was put up for sale during construction, but bids for her fell through, (Note: Bidders included the Island Fuel and Maritime Company, the American Fuel Oil and Transportation Company, the Lincoln Steamship Company, the Beaver Company, and a French consortium.) resulting in her being laid up in San Francisco Bay until 1924.

She was then sold as scrap to the Peralta Portland Cement Company for $15,000.00 ($281,796 in 2025) on July 31, 1924. Although the company intended to use her hulk as a cement mill, she was resold in September 1926 to Ocean Industries, Inc., and in October 1926 her hulk was moved to Monterey Bay to be used as a reduction fishery. After legal troubles around fishing in California waters, the hulk was moved again in June 1927, this time to Port Armstrong, Alaska. By March 1930, plans were underway for a new operator, San Francisco-based Sea Food Packing Corporation, to convert her to a sardine cannery in Richmond, California. In 1932, she was purchased by Elwyn C. Hale and outfitted with additional equipment, and continued operation until 1945, when the Pacific sardine fisheries collapsed.

She was then moored off Antioch, California, in 1948 and stripped of her machinery. She was donated to the Presbytery of San Francisco on October 14, 1958. She was thereafter sold to MacMillan Bloedel and moored as part of The Hulks, a floating breakwater in the Powell River of British Columbia to protect the company's log-storage pond. The facility and ship were eventually acquired by Catalyst Paper. She was one of six hulks that remained after the breakwater was downsized in 1991, but on June 23, 2018, it was announced that the Peralta would be one of four ships to be sunk to create an artificial reef.

She was recognized in 2013 by Guinness World Records as the largest concrete ship still afloat.

== Gallery ==
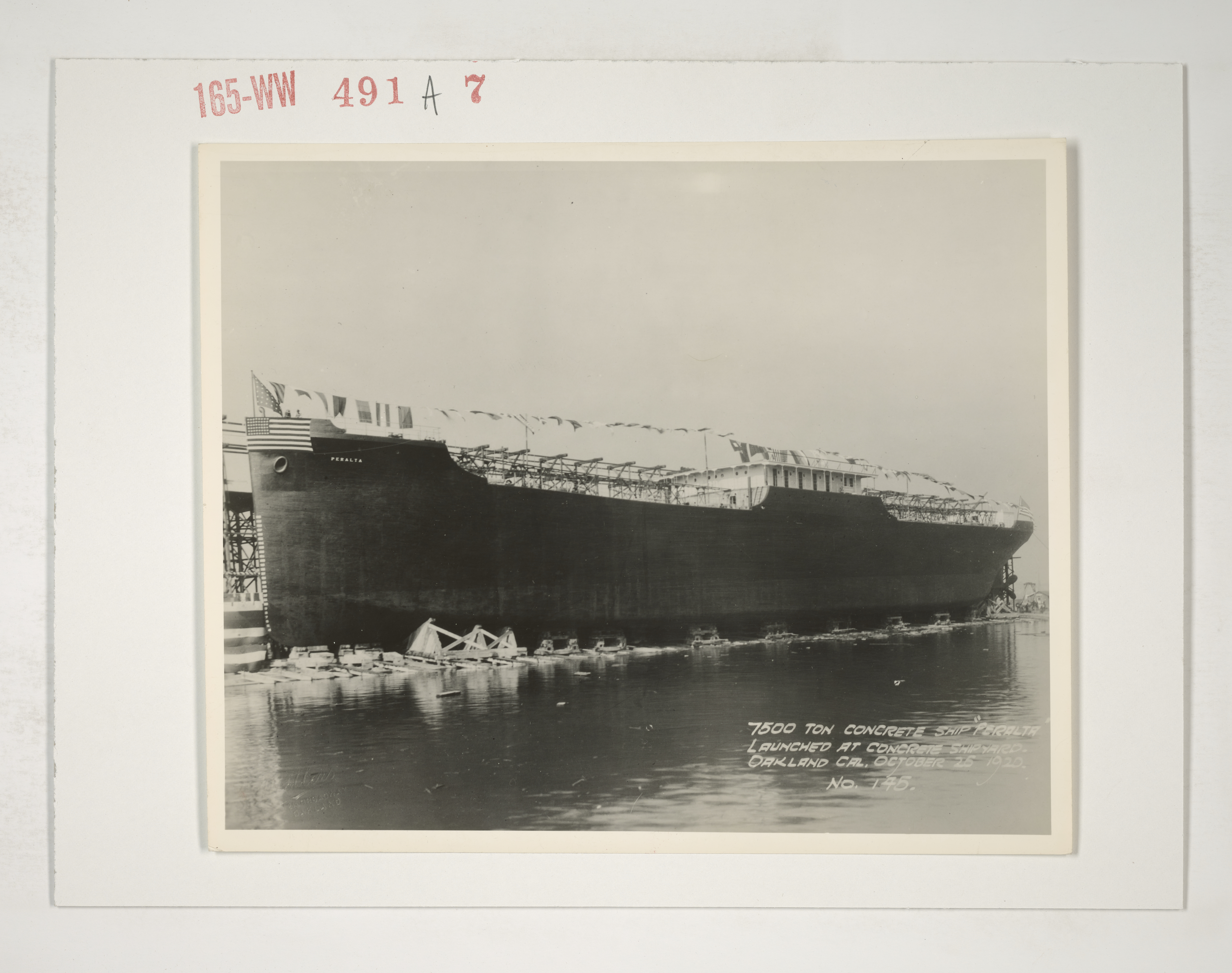
SS Peralta readied for launch

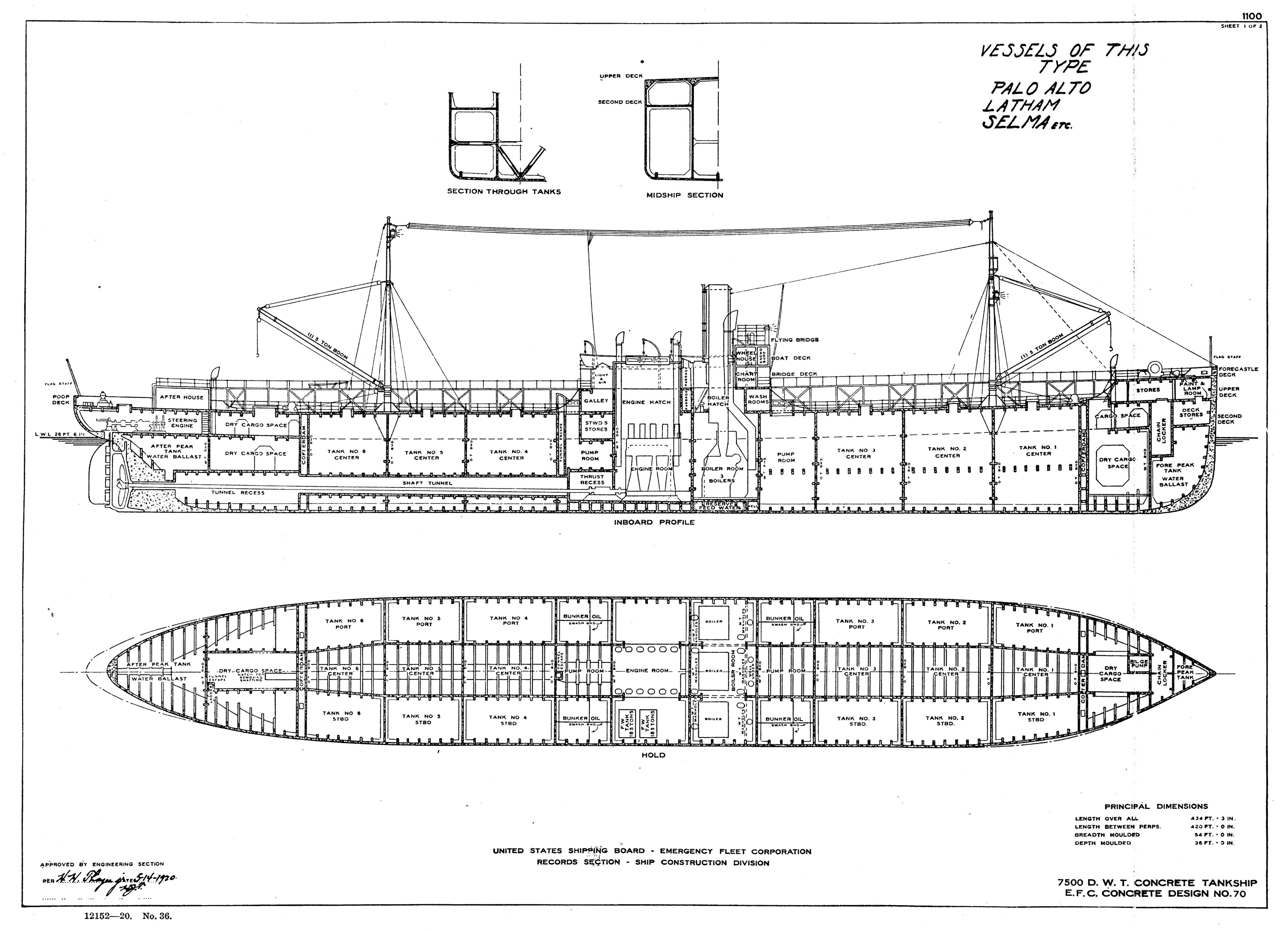
Design 1100 inboard profile and hold plans

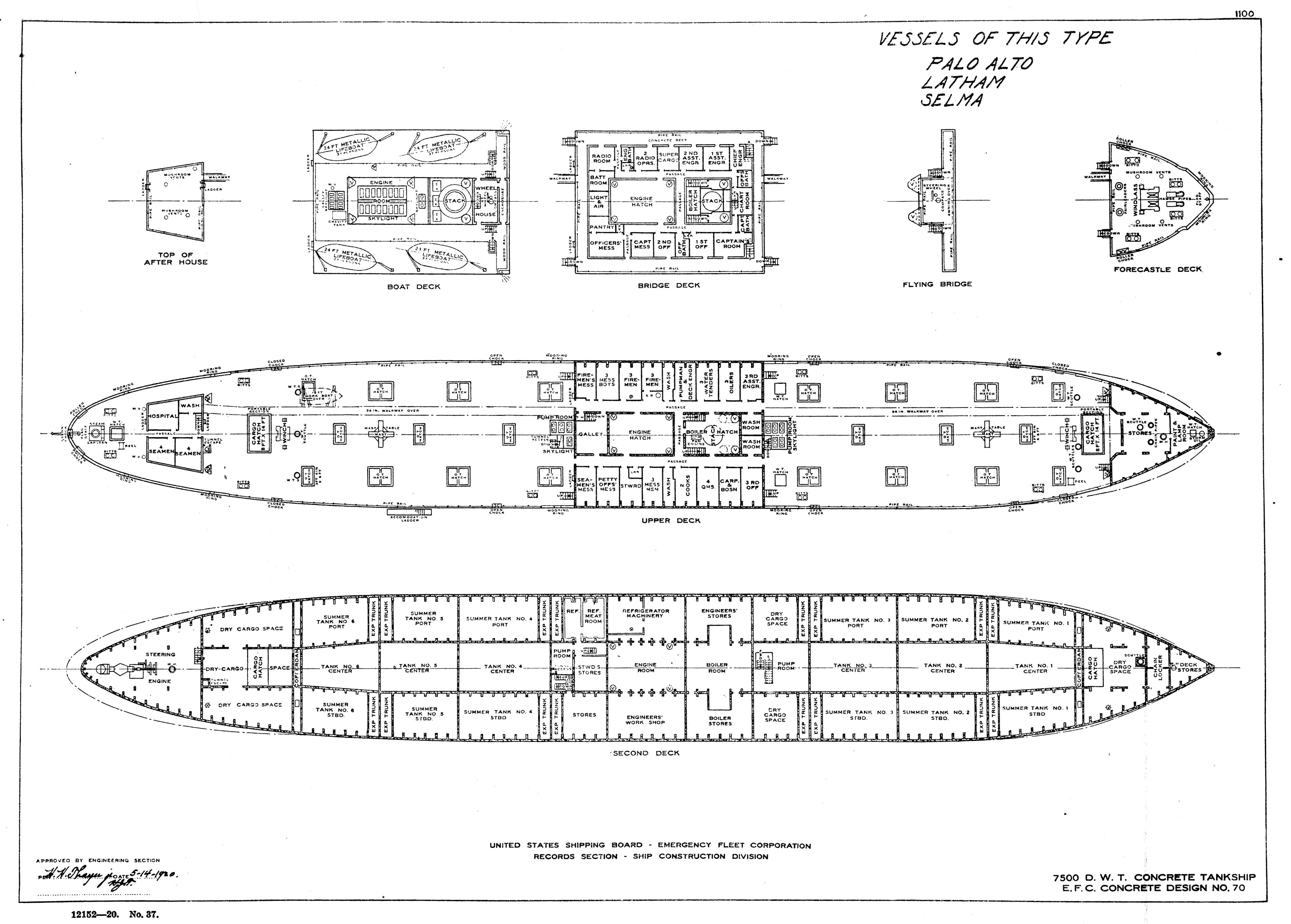
Design 1100 deck plans
