= The Hulks =

Floating breakwater off British Columbia, Canada

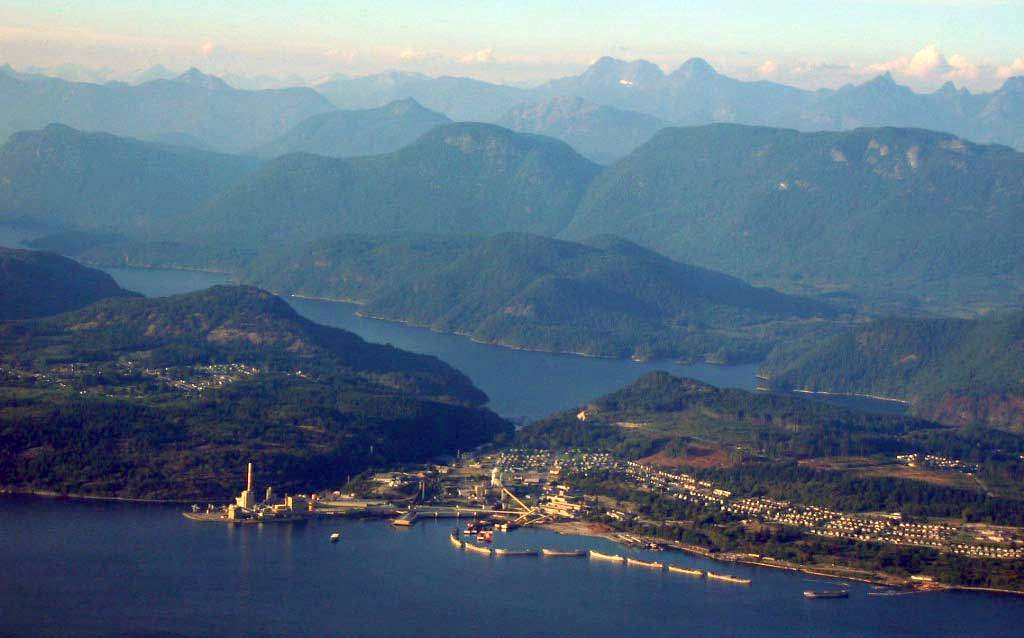
A 2004 view of the city of Powell River with its breakwater ships visible.

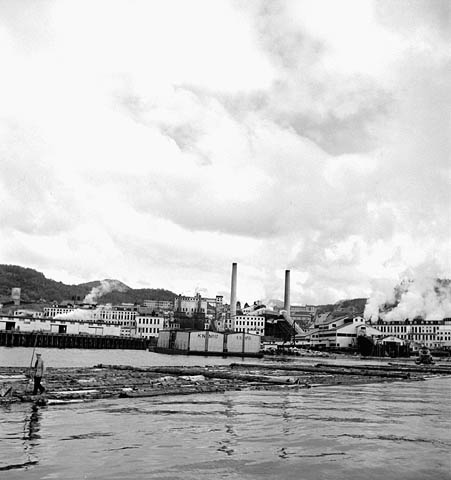
A 1944 photo showing the paper mill and some loggers in the pool.

The Hulks or The Giant Hulks, more formally known as the Powell River Floating Breakwater, is a floating breakwater off the Sunshine Coast of British Columbia, a Pacific coast province of Canada. The breakwater is a prominent landmark of the city of Powell River and may be the largest floating breakwater in the world.

The breakwater consists of floating concrete ships from the World War II era and one, SS Peralta, from the World War I era. Steel was in short supply during wartime leading to shipbuilders to resort to alternatives such a concrete. These heavy, awkwardly maneuverable ships were called "hulks". It was originally constructed by the Powell River Company, a pulp and paper mill, and the ships helped form their log pond.

== The ships ==
The Powell River Company originally purchased 19 ships for their fleet. Of the steel or wooden-hulled vessel, Charleston was the first ship to arrive on 25 October 1930. The ship was removed in 1961. Huron was the second ship to arrive, in August 1931. The hulk sank in a storm on 18 February 1961. Blatchford was a wooden vessel that arrived in 1936 and sank sometime in 1939. Malahat was a wooden vessel that arrived in 1945, but was scuttled a year later. Island Carrier arrived in December 1945, but was returned to commercial service in 1954. Albertolite was added in 1946, but was scrapped in 1960. Malaspina arrived in 1946, sank in 1949, and was raised and scrapped in 1951. Coaticook was added in 1953 and scuttled off Race Rocks in 1961. Cardena was brought in to replace Coaticook but was removed in 1966.

In addition to the ships with hulls of standard construction were those made of concrete. YOGN 82 arrived in 1961 and was scuttled to make an artificial reef in 2018 by the Artificial Reef Society of British Columbia. Peralta arrived in 1958 and was the last World War I era concrete ship still floating. Quartz was a barge that arrived on 12 November 1956. Emile N. Vidal arrived in 1958, Armand Considere, John Smeaton, L. J. Vicat, and M. H. Le Chatelier in 1948, P. M. Anderson in 1956, and Thaddeus Merriman in 1950.

=== Configuration ===
As seen from left to right from the coast, the configuration of the ships is given roughly below.

==== ?–2002 ====
- YOGN 82
- M. H. Le Chatelier
- Quartz
- P. M. Anderson
- Peralta
- Emile N. Vidal
- John Smeaton
- Thaddeus Merriman
- L. J. Vicat
- Armand Considere

==== 2002–2018 ====
The ships were re-arranged in 2002.

- YOGN 82
- Peralta
- Quartz
- Emile N. Vidal
- M. H. Le Chatelier
- P. M. Anderson
- John Smeaton
- Thaddeus Merriman
- L. J. Vicat
- Armand Considere

==== 2018–? ====
In 2018, YOGN-82 was towed away and sunk to form an artificial reef, the first of four designated for that purpose.
