= Ahgykson Island =

Island in British Columbia, Canada

Ahgykson Island ʔaʔgayqsən (Comox)
- Island
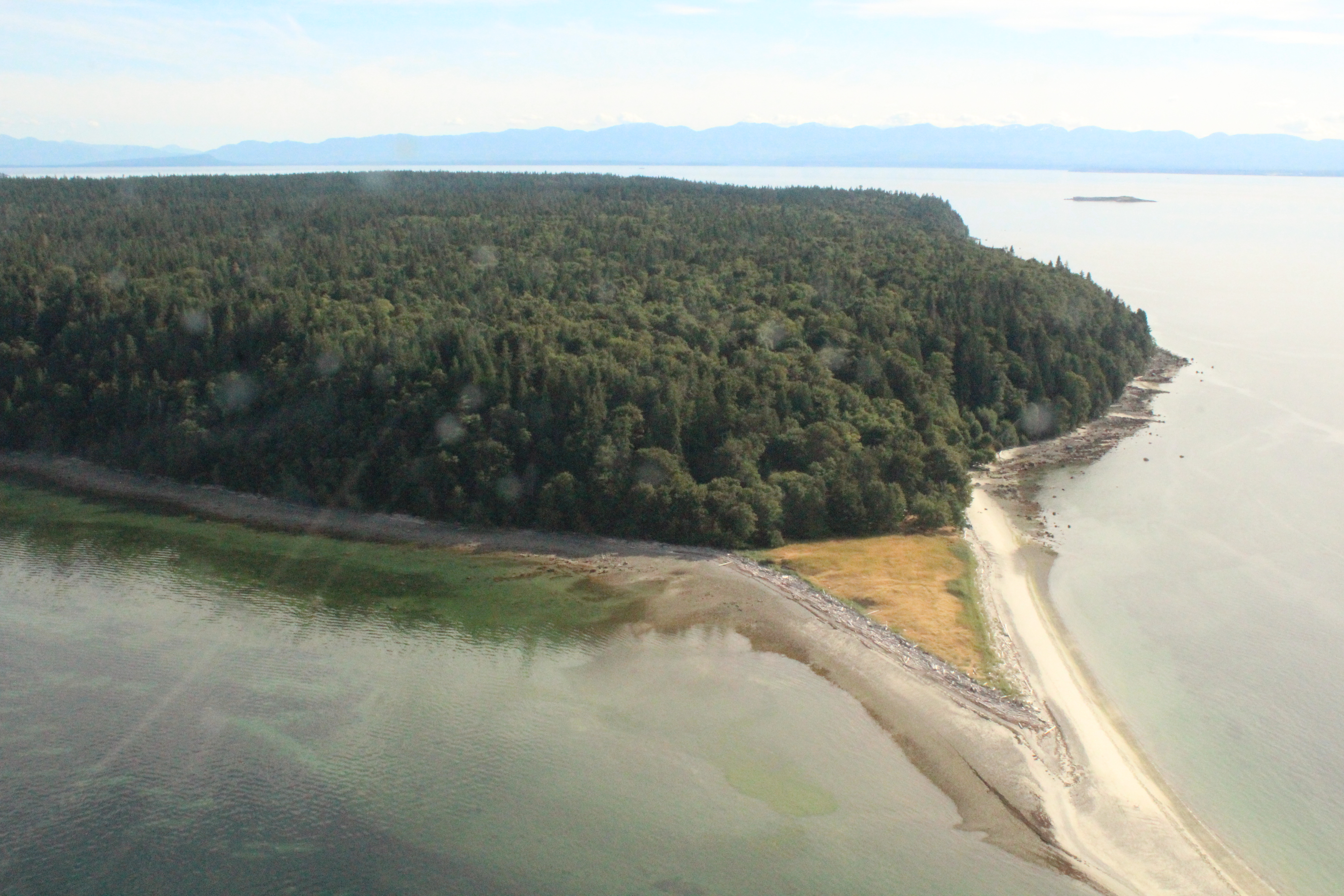
- Spit off Ahgykson Island

- Location within British Columbia
- Coordinates: 49°52′N 124°39′W
- Location: qathet RD, British Columbia
- Part of: Northern Gulf Islands

Area
  - Total: 9.25 km^{2} (3.57 mi^{2})
- Topo map: NTS 92F15 Powell River

Ahgykson (ʔaʔgayqsən [ah-gyk-sun]) Island, formerly Harwood Island, is a small island off the coast of Powell River, BC. It is an Indian reserve and part of the traditional territory of the Tla'amin First Nation.

== Etymology ==
The island has long been called "Ahgykson" by the Tla'amin people who have lived in this territory for at least 8,000 years. In 1798, Captain George Vancouver renamed it in his records as "Harwood Island." The traditional Tla'amin name was officially reinstated on 5 April 2016. BC Geographic maps updated spelling on 5 April 2025 to ʔaʔgayqsən (island), as recommended by the Tla'amin Nation in 2024.

== Geography ==
Ahgykson Island is the northernmost island of the Northern Gulf Islands.

== See also ==
- Savary Island
