= Kʼómoks =

Kʼómoks
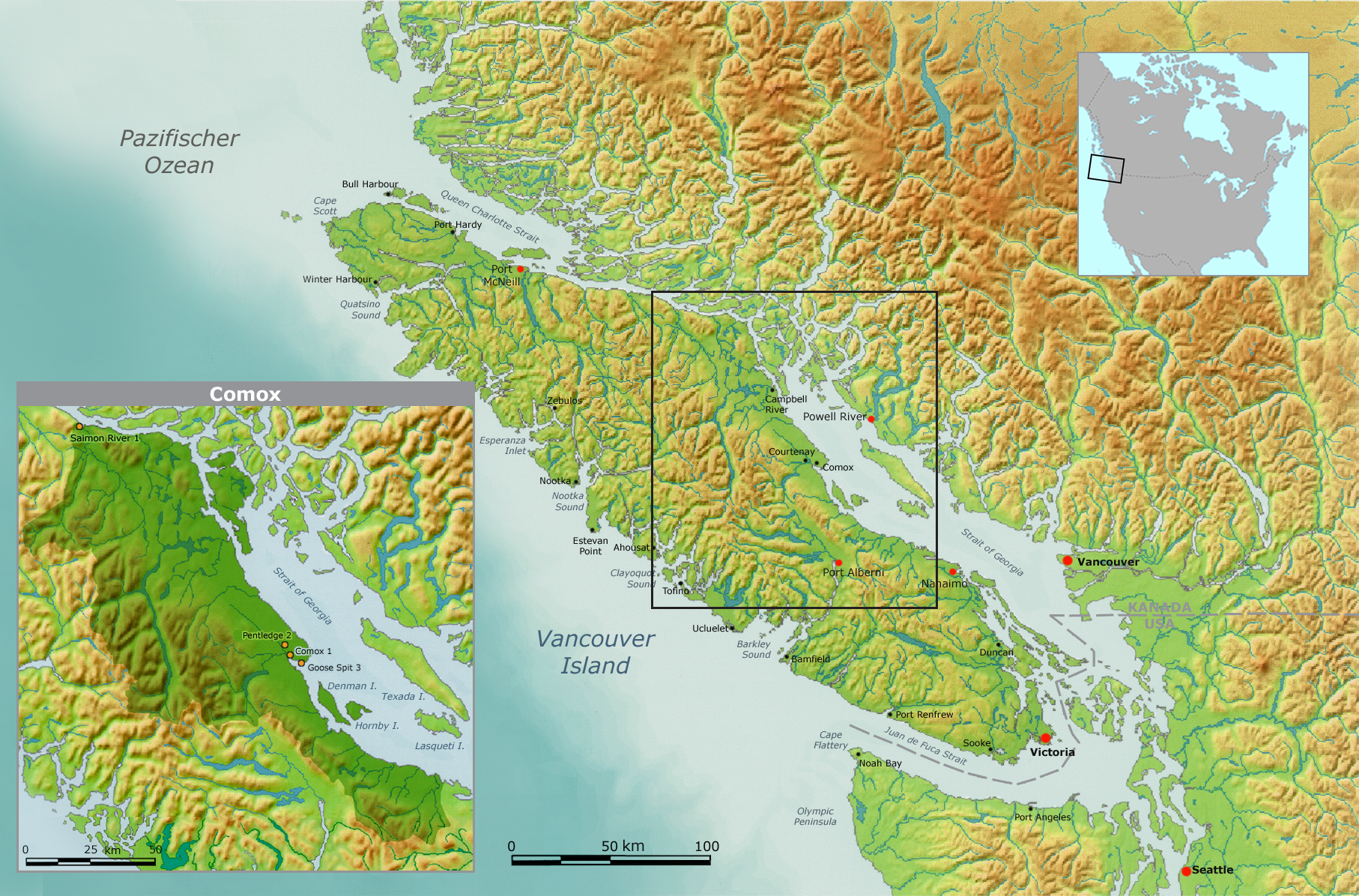
- Map showing traditional territory of the Island Comox; Mainland Comox not shown

Total population
- 2,739 (2025)

Regions with significant populations
- British Columbia

Languages
- English, Ayajuthem

Religion
- Animism

Related ethnic groups
- Coast Salish peoples

The Kʼómoks (also spelled Comox) are a Coast Salish Indigenous people whose traditional territory is centered in the north-central Salish Sea and southern Johnstone Strait. They are characterized by a common language (Ayajuthem; a Coast Salishan language).

The term "Kʼómoks" derives from the Kwakʼwala wordkwʼumuxws, meaning "plentiful." It is very unlikely that Ayajuthem-speaking people, who are now called Kʼómoks, ever used that word to refer to themselves, and they may not have even seen themselves as one ethnic group as is implied by this article.

The Kʼómoks are further divided based on dialect:

- The Island Comox refers to those Kʼómoks living in the area of the Comox Valley and consisted of what is now known as the Kʼómoks First Nation (consisting of the Sathloot, Sasitla, Ieeksen, and Xa’xe tribes, and the culturally distinct Pentlatch) and Qualicum First Nation (see note in Modern Governance, below).
- The Mainland Comox refer to those Kʼómoks living on the smaller islands of the north-central Salish Sea (e.g. Cortes Island) and in the river valleys around and between Jervis Inlet and Bute Inlet. These people are now organized under band governments; the Tla'amin, the Klahoose, and the Homalco.

== History ==
=== Pre-contact History ===
==== Island Comox ====
The Island Comox territory extended from Salmon River, in the north, all the way to Englishman River, in the south.

The northern territory (Salmon River to Oyster River and the offshore islands) was held by tribes now organized as part of the Kʼómoks First Nation. Historically, they called themselves:

- The sathloot people, consisting of tribes such as sasitla, sathloot, yayaqwiltah, katkadul, komokwe/salaltbut, who lived on southern Quadra Island and within the Quinsam River watershed, including settlements at Cape Mudge, Campbell River, and Seymour Narrows. They later moved south in approximately 1850–1855
- The ieekan who lived in the areas surrounding Campbell River, Oyster River, and Mitlenatch Island. They later moved south from Campbell River between 1830 and 1835
- The xa'xe who lived amongst the ieekan and sathloot, notably at Campbell River and south Quadra Island.

Sharing the land and waters around Salmon River were the Hahamatsees/Walitsma, a Kwakwaka'wakw people.

The southern territory (roughly Cape Lazo to Englishman River) was occupied by the Pentlach, including tribes such as:

- the s:uckcan, who lived between Union Bay and Deep Bay
- the saαlαm, who had a primary village at the mouth of the Qualicum River, and whose territory extended from Deep Bay to Parksville
- the chuá - chuatl, who lived between Little Qualicum River and Englishman River

==== Mainland Comox ====
The Mainland Comox territory included many of the river inlets between Jervis Inlet and Bute Inlet.

=== Early European contact ===
It has been speculated that Francis Drake may have sailed as far north as the 48th latitude during his Pacific voyages in 1579, but he is unlikely to have encountered the Kʼómoks.

Spain was the first European country to explore the Pacific Northwest following the expedition of Juan José Pérez Hernández in 1774, but it is unlikely that the Kʼómoks had direct European contact occurred until the first circumnavigations of Vancouver Island in 1792 by George Vancouver of England and Galiano and Flores of Spain. It is likely that the Kʼómoks encountered Europeans first not by direct contact but indirectly via a smallpox epidemic in 1790, which caused a significant decline in Indigenous populations.

In the years surrounding European contact, the Laich-kwil-tach people began a southern expansion, which pushed the northern tribes of the Kʼómoks southward into Pentlach territory. As a result, Laich-kwil-tach, Kʼómoks, and Pentlach language and culture began to blend.

Between around 1830 and 1850, many of the above-mentioned tribes were forcibly relocated from their village sites and traditional territories. Smallpox continued to spread throughout indigenous communities and caused significant declines in populations.

In the 1860s, Richard Mayne travelled extensively throughout British Columbia. Of the Kʼómoks, he stated,:

"They are a large tribe, and have a reputation of being rather savage, though we always found them very peaceably disposed. They know quite well the value of the 6,000 to 8,000 acres of clear land which they possess..."

The first baptisms of the area are noted to have occurred on Denman Island in 1860.

In 1876, the Comox First Nation was created under the Indian Act.

By the 1890s, residential schools began appearing on the west coast of Mainland BC, as well as in Vancouver Island and surrounding islands. Kʼómoks children were likely taken to one or more of the Sechelt Residential School, the Alberni Residential School, the St. Michael's Residential School, and the Kuper Island Residential School.

The Hahamatsees/Walitsma were amalgamated into the Comox First Nation in 1940.

== Modern Governance ==
Following European contact, the Kʼómoks were organized around five band governments as described below:

Band	Location	Population (2025)	Treaty Status (28 Jan 2026)
Kʼómoks First Nation	Central Vancouver Island	355	6
Tla'amin Nation	Sunshine Coast; Powell River	1,268	Signed
Klahoose First Nation	Discovery Islands	455	4
Homalco First Nation	Toba Inlet	501	4
Qualicum First Nation	Qualicum River	160	no information available

Note: Qualicum First Nation members are likely predominately descendants of the Pentlach people, not Kʼómoks. Many Pentlach and Kʼómoks intermarried, and population declines and forced relocation by colonial interests likely resulted in Kʼómoks and Pentlach tribes intermixing.

== Art and Culture ==
The Kʼómoks are situated at what is considered to be the northern extent of the Coast Salish cultural group and the southern extent of Kwakwaka'wakw cultural group. As such, many of their cultural practices represent a unique blending of the two:

- They are renowned for their canoes and wood carving.
- Some tribes would practice above-ground burials and tree burials.
- Strong ancestral ties; often burn food as offering to ancestors.
- Left many petroglyphs, such as those at Chrome Island.
- Had numerous sites throughout their territory with sacred energies. these sites would be used for various purposes such as ritual bathing or mortuary ceremonies,.
- Flood mythologies are prevalent (e.g., the Pentlach and Tla'amin have stories about great floods).
- Cedar weaving is prevalent throughout.
- Property was distributed to guests in potlatches and elaborate naming ceremonies honoured the youth, leaders and elders of the communities.
- Highest-ranking tribes would over winter at the Whale House on Quadra Island.

== Language ==
The Comox language is critically endangered and has an estimated 36 speakers. Effort is being expended to develop a program to revitalize the language.

There are at least four dialects spoken: Coast Salish, Pentlatch and ayajusem (Island Comox dialect), and Kwakʼwala. Kwakʼwala is the most common language used in the region, it was used during the fur-trading era, in ceremonies, and during intermarriages and has evolved into a more complex system over time.

Pentlatch has become less common; Kʼomoks ancestors are said to have spoken the dialect. Pentlactch is more specific to the Coast Salish Side of Kʼomoks. The last fluent speaker of Pentlatch passed in 1940.

Ayajusem, also known as the Island Comox dialect, is spoken in more specific regions such as Sathloot, Sasitla, Leeksun, Xa'xe, and Komokwe Peoples. The last fluent speaker died in the 1990s.

Both Pentaltch and ayajusem contain some linguistic features influenced by Kwakʼwala, such as the disappearance of an s-nominalizer in some instances, as well as a few vocabulary words. However, they are overall distinct languages and do not contain sufficient elements of a Wakashan language structure.

Today, the original languages of both Sathloot groups are extinct, The Island Comox dialect, or Qʼómox̣ʷs (Salhulhtxw / Saɬuɬtxʷ), and the Puntletch/Puntledge (Pənƛ̕áč) language have breplaced by the Liqʼwala dialect and later English.
