= HMCS Malaspina =

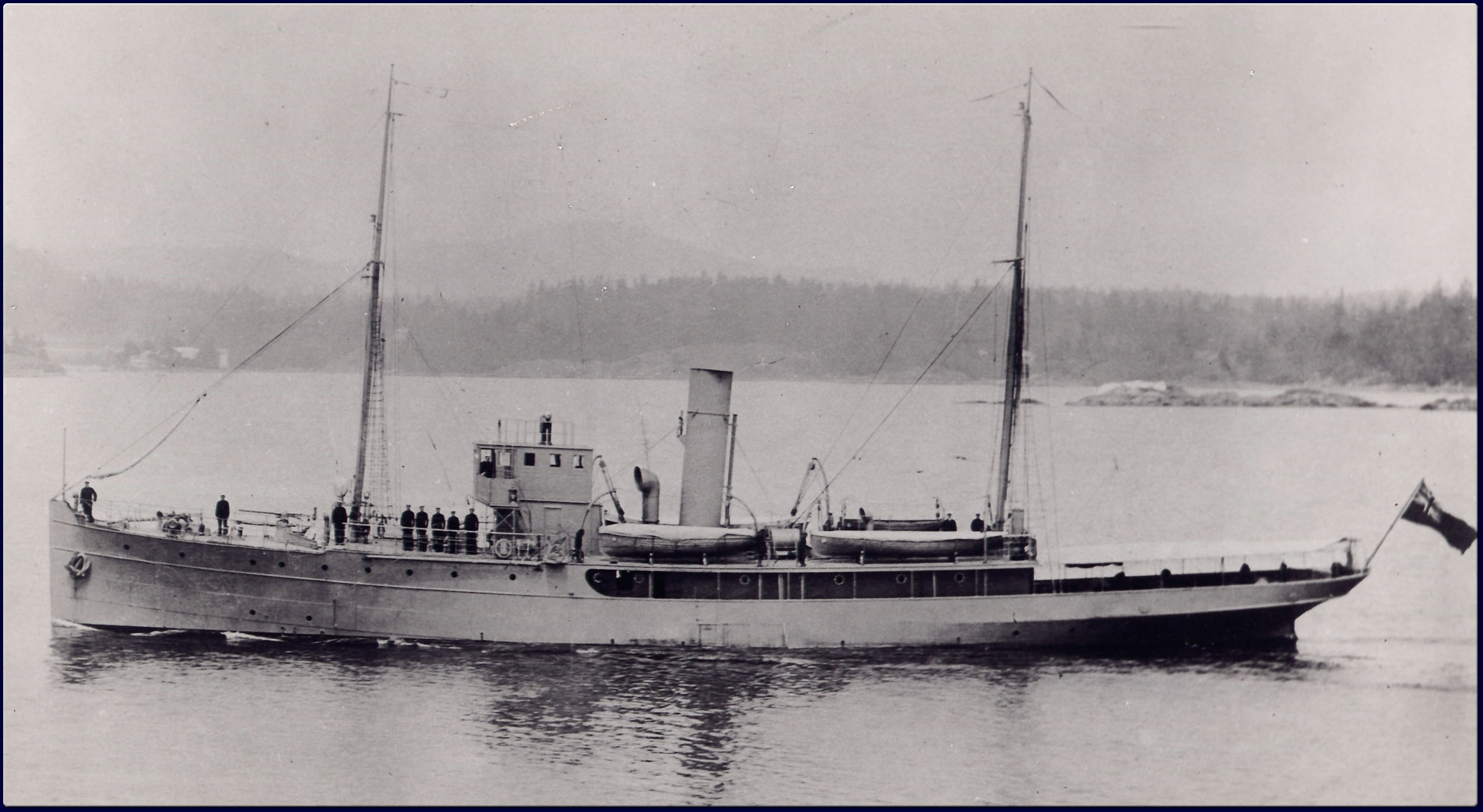
- HMCS Malaspina underway

History

Canada
- Name: Malaspina
- Builder: Dublin Dockyard, Dublin
- Laid down: 1913
- Launched: 6 July 1913
- Completed: August 1913
- In service: 1913
- Out of service: 1 December 1917
- Fate: Transferred to Royal Canadian Navy 1917

Canada
- Name: Malaspina
- Commissioned: 1 December 1917
- Decommissioned: 31 March 1920
- Recommissioned: 6 September 1939
- Decommissioned: 24 January 1945
- Fate: Sold, 1946

General characteristics
- Type: Patrol vessel
- Tonnage: 392 GRT
- Length: 162.4 ft (49.5 m) pp.
- Beam: 27.1 ft (8.3 m)
- Draught: 13.1 ft (4.0 m)
- Propulsion: 1 screw, triple expansion steam engine, 1,350 ihp (1,007 kW)
- Speed: 14.5 knots (27 km/h)
- Complement: 33

HMCS Malaspina was a Canadian government fisheries patrol vessel pressed into service with the Royal Canadian Navy in 1917 and again in 1939 and which therefore saw service during the First World War and Second World War. The vessel was constructed in 1913 in Dublin, Ireland, and patrolled the fisheries along the West Coast of Canada.

A sister ship of CGS Galiano, Malaspina was also taken over by the Royal Canadian Navy, and both ships mixed civil duties with naval patrol and examination work, including minesweeping training and trials, for much of the war. Malaspina survived the war and returned to fisheries protection work in 1920. In 1939, following the outbreak of the Second World War, Malaspina was again commissioned in the Royal Canadian Navy, serving as a patrol and examination vessel and subsequently as a training ship before being paid off in 1945 and sold in 1946. The ship became part of the Powell River Breakwater in the Powell River in British Columbia sometime in 1946, sank sometime in 1949, and was raised and scrapped in 1951.

== Design and description ==
Malaspina was designed as coastal patrol vessel. The vessel had a gross register tonnage (GRT) of 392, was 162.4 ft (49.5 m) long between perpendiculars with a beam of 27.1 ft (8.3 m) and a draught of 13.1 ft (4.0 m). The ship was divided into twenty watertight compartments by both transverse and longitudinal bulkheads. The vessel was powered by a triple expansion steam engine driving one screw creating 1,350 indicated horsepower (1,007 kW). This gave Malaspina a maximum speed of 14.5 knots (27 km/h). In Royal Canadian Navy service, the ship was armed with one QF 6-pounder Hotchkiss gun mounted forward and had a complement of 33.

== Construction and career ==
The vessel's keel was laid down by Dublin Dockyard in Dublin, Ireland and the vessel was launched on 6 July 1913. Malaspina was completed in August 1913. The date on which Malaspina became a government ship differs between the sources, with Macpherson & Barrie claiming the vessel joined in 1913 and Maginley & Collin, 1914. Upon joining the government fleet, Malaspina became a fisheries patrol vessel on the West Coast of Canada. After the First World War broke out, Malaspina and sister ship Galiano alternated between naval and civic duties along the Pacific coast, being retained as part of the government fleet. This included performing examination duties at Esquimalt, British Columbia. On 1 December 1917, Malaspina was commissioned into the Royal Canadian Navy, detailed with the duty of intercepting contraband in the Strait of Juan de Fuca.

Following the First World War, Malaspina was paid off on 31 March 1920. The Royal Canadian Navy and returned to the Department of Transport's Marine Service as a patrol vessel. Malaspina remained in this service until 6 September 1939 when, with the outbreak of the Second World War, the vessel rejoined the Royal Canadian Navy. Malaspina was deployed on patrol and ship examination duties along the West Coast before joining HMCS Royal Roads as a training ship. Malaspina was paid off on 31 March 1945 and sold the following year. The ship became part of the Powell River Breakwater in the Powell River in British Columbia sometime in 1946, sank sometime in 1949, and was raised and scrapped in 1951. The ship was broken up by Wagner, Stein & Green at their site in Victoria, British Columbia in the third quarter of 1951.

== Sources ==
- Johnston, William; Rawling, William G.P.; Gimblett, Richard H. & MacFarlane, John (2010). The Seabound Coast: The Official History of the Royal Canadian Navy, 1867–1939. Vol. 1. Toronto: Dundurn Press. ISBN 978-1-55488-908-2.
- Macpherson, Ken & Barrie, Ron (2002). The Ships of Canada's Naval Forces 1910–2002 (Third ed.). St. Catharines, Ontario: Vanwell Publishing. ISBN 1-55125-072-1.
- Maginley, Charles D. & Collin, Bernard (2001). The Ships of Canada's Marine Services. St. Catharines, Ontario: Vanwell Publishing Limited. ISBN 1-55125-070-5.
- "Launches and Trial Trips". International Marine Engineering. 36 (August). New York—London: Marine Engineering, Inc.: 33 1913.
- "Malaspina (1136044)". Miramar Ship Index.
