= Walker Powell =

Canadian politician (1828–1915)

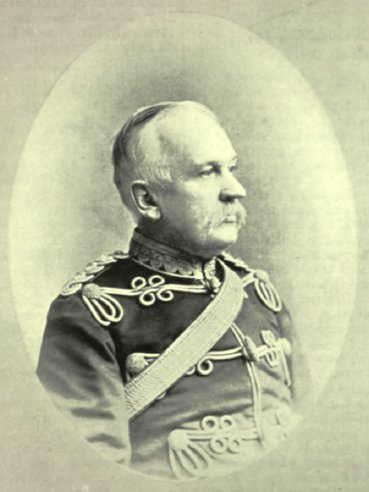

Member of the Legislative Assembly of the Province of Canada for Norfolk
- In office December 1857 – May 1861
- Preceded by: John Rolph
- Succeeded by: Aquila Walsh

Personal details
- Born: May 20, 1828 Waterford, Upper Canada
- Died: May 6, 1915 (aged 86) Ottawa, Ontario
- Spouses: Catherine Emma Culver (m. 1853; died 1855); Mary Ursula Bowlby (m. 1857)
- Children: 6, including Charles
- Parent: Israel Wood Powell (father)

Walker Powell (May 20, 1828 – May 6, 1915) was a Canadian businessman, militia officer and political figure.

== Education ==
He was born in Waterford, Upper Canada in 1828, the son of Israel Wood Powell. He was educated at the county Grammar School. He studied at Victoria College in Cobourg and settled in Port Dover.

== Career ==
He was engaged in mercantile pursuits. He served on the council for Norfolk County, becoming warden in 1856. He also served in the local militia. Powell worked as an insurance agent and ran a shipping company. In 1857, he was elected to the Legislative Assembly for Norfolk. He served as a member of the Legislative Assembly for Norfolk County, 1857–1861. He was named deputy adjutant general for the militia in Canada West in 1862.

He served during the Fenian Raid in 1866. In 1868, he was named to the same post for the Dominion of Canada. He served as Adjutant-general of the Dominion, 1875–1896. Powell supported the choice of Kingston as the site for the Royal Military College of Canada.

He served in the Rebellions of 1869-1870 and 1885.

He retired in Ottawa in 1895 and died there in 1915.

== Family ==
His brother Israel Wood served in the House of Assembly for Vancouver Island. Powell's son Charles Berkeley represented the city of Ottawa in the Ontario legislative assembly. His daughter Linnie Emma married McLeod Stewart, who was an Ottawa mayor.
