= Israel Wood Powell (Province of Canada politician) =

Merchant and politician, Province of Canada

Member of the Legislative Assembly of the Province of Canada for Norfolk
- In office 1841–1847
- Preceded by: New position
- Succeeded by: Henry John Boulton

Personal details
- Born: 1801 Windham Township, Upper Canada
- Died: 1852 (aged 50–51)
- Party: Moderate Reformer
- Spouse: Melinda Boss
- Children: Walker Powell; Israel Wood Powell
- Profession: Merchant, surveyor

Israel Wood Powell (1801 – 1852) was a merchant, land surveyor and political figure in Canada West, Province of Canada. He represented Norfolk in the Legislative Assembly of the Province of Canada from 1841 to 1848.

Powell was born in Windham Township, Norfolk County, Upper Canada. He worked as a clerk in a store in Waterford, later opening his own store in Colborne. Powell married Melinda Boss.

Powell prepared the village plan for Port Dover, where he opened a store and built a new home. He also served as warden for the Talbot District and as a member of the municipal council for Norfolk County.

In 1841, Powell was elected to the first Parliament of the Province of Canada, and re-elected in the general election of 1844. He was a moderate Reformer who supported the union of Upper Canada and Lower Canada into the new Province of Canada. Although not originally a supporter of Robert Baldwin, the "ultra" Reform leader, he gradually joined with Baldwin and other Reformers to form a more cohesive group. He did not stand for re-election in the general election of 1848.

His son Walker Powell also served in the legislature for the Province of Canada. Another son, also named Israel Wood Powell, served in the colonial Legislative Assembly of Vancouver Island and later as British Columbia's Superintendent of Indian Affairs, and is the namesake of the city of Powell River.
