= Victoria Fire Department =

Fire department serving the city of Victoria (British Columbia, Canada)

Operational area
- Country: Canada
- Province: British Columbia
- City: Victoria

Facilities and equipment
- Stations: 3
- Fireboats: 1

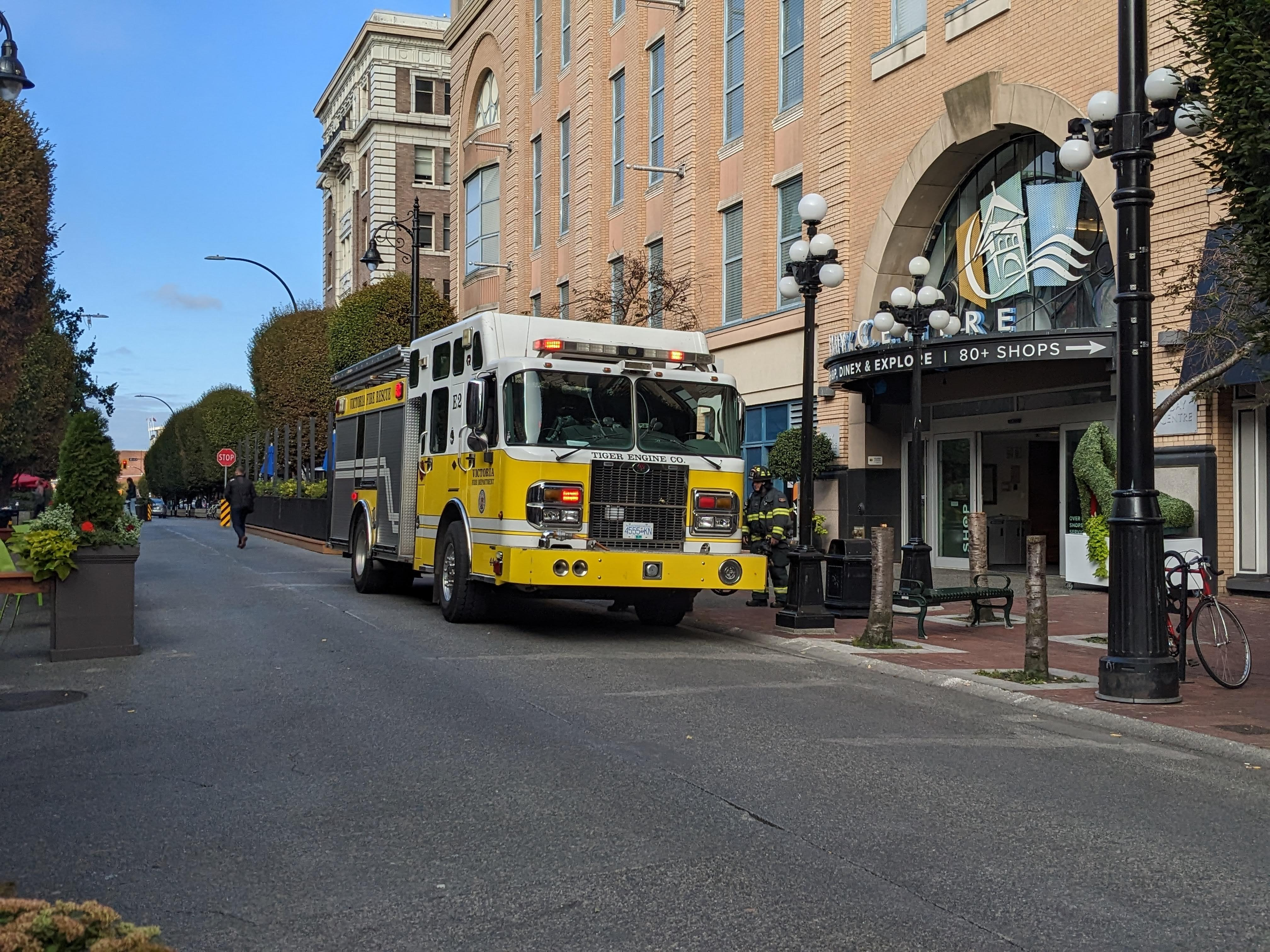
The VFDs Tiger Engine Co. (VFD Engine 2) in action.

The Victoria Fire Department (VFD) serves the City of Victoria, British Columbia in Canada.

VFD operates three land-based fire stations, plus a marine unit. It is neighboured by Oak Bay Fire Department, Saanich Fire Department and Esquimalt Fire Department.

In 2022, the Victoria Fire Department performed 3,365 life safety inspections, provided community safety education to 5,439 attendees and responded to 9,481 emergency incidents

Since 1969, the VFD has sported a unique safety yellow on their trucks as opposed to the traditional fire engine red which is used by many of its neighbouring departments.

In April 2023, the new Fire Hall 1 and department headquarters building opened at 1025 Johnson Street. The fire hall is part of a new 12-storey, mixed-use development that includes 130 units of purpose-built, affordable homes. In addition, BC Emergency Health Services (BCEHS) will occupy 297 square metres (3,200 square feet) to operate a stand-alone, two-ambulance bay, downtown location for paramedics under a planned 20-year lease agreement
