= HMCS Galiano =

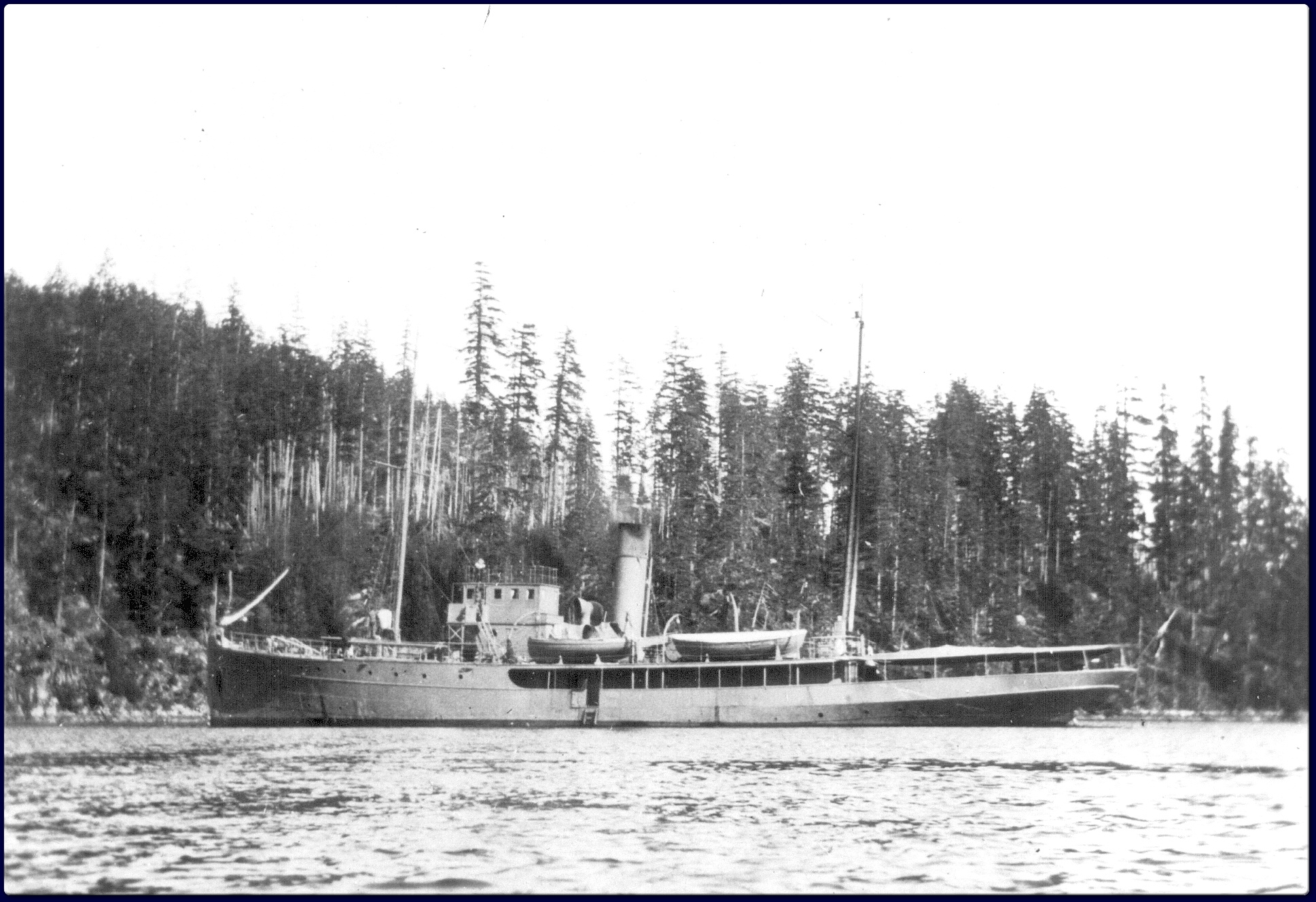
- HMCS Galiano

History

Canada
- Name: Galiano
- Builder: Dublin Dockyard, Dublin
- Launched: 18 October 1913
- Completed: December 1913
- Acquired: 1914, as CGS Galiano
- Commissioned: 15 December 1917, as HMCS Galiano
- Stricken: 1918
- Fate: Foundered 30 October 1918

General characteristics
- Class & type: Patrol vessel
- Tonnage: 393 GRT
- Length: 162 ft 3 in (49.5 m)
- Beam: 27 ft 0 in (8.2 m)
- Draught: 13 ft 0 in (4.0 m)
- Propulsion: Triple expansion steam engine, 1,350 ihp (1,010 kW), 1 shaft
- Speed: 14.5 knots (26.9 km/h)
- Complement: 33

HMCS Galiano was a Canadian government fisheries patrol vessel pressed into service with the Royal Canadian Navy in 1917 during the First World War. Used for patrol and assessment duties on the West Coast of Canada, Galiano disappeared in a storm in October 1918 with 39 crew and one civilian, making her Canada's only warship lost during the First World War.

== Description ==
Galiano was 162 feet 3 inches (49.5 m) long between perpendiculars with a beam of 27 feet 0 inches (8.2 m) and a draught of 13 feet 0 inches (4.0 m). The vessel had a gross register tonnage (GRT) of 393. The vessel was powered by a single steam-powered triple-expansion engine driving one shaft creating 1,350 indicated horsepower (1,007 kW). This gave the vessel a maximum speed of 14.5 knots (26.9 km/h). In Royal Canadian Navy service, the vessel had a complement of 33.

== Construction and career ==
The vessel was constructed by Dublin Dockyard in Dublin, Ireland, in 1913. Galiano was a steel-hulled, single-screw vessel launched on 18 October 1913 and completed in December 1913. The sister ship of CGS Malaspina, the vessel was acquired by the Canadian government in 1914 for service on the West Coast of Canada as a fisheries patrol vessel.

Galiano arrived in Esquimalt, British Columbia, on 21 February 1914 to start her duties in the fisheries protection service as a patrol boat with the prefix Canadian Government Ship (CGS). After the First World War broke out, Galiano and sister ship Malaspina alternated between naval and civic duties along the Pacific coast, being retained as part of the government fleet. This included performing examination duties at Esquimalt. Galiano was commissioned in the Royal Canadian Navy on 15 December 1917 and given the prefix His Majesty's Canadian Ship (HMCS). Lieutenant R. M. Pope of the Royal Canadian Naval Volunteer Reserve was given command of the vessel.

=== Loss ===
In late October 1918, Galiano, just returned from the Queen Charlotte Islands and, in need of some repair, was sent with supplies to the lighthouse at Triangle Island (Note: Originally her sister ship Malaspina was meant to make the trip, but she was damaged in a collision with jetty, so Galiano was sent instead) off Cape Scott at the northwestern tip of Vancouver Island where they picked up the only civilian on the ship when she sank. Weather reports indicated that Galiano only had a short window time to reach and return from Triangle Island before a violent storm came in from the north. (Note: Some sources say that this was the same storm that sank SS Princess Sophia during a night a few days prior) At least eight members of her regular crew were unable to make the trip due to illness as the 1918 flu pandemic had reached her base at Esquimalt. She set out towards the Queen Charlotte Islands from Triangle Island at 5:00 PM on 29 October 1918. When she made her only distress call, at 3:00 AM the next morning, saying "Hold's full of water... For God's sake send help." At the time she was estimated to be within visual range of the light at Cape St. James 153 kilometres (95 mi) from Triangle Island where the call was picked up by a wireless operator at the same station they had embarked to resupply. She was never heard from again and went down with the loss of all hands. At the time of her distress call, there were heavy seas running at her location in Queen Charlotte Sound. A search for survivors was launched soon after but was unsuccessful. Galiano was lost just days after SS Princess Sophia ran aground on Vanderbilt Reef, near Skagway, Alaska also in heavy weather. The official naval inquiry, lacking any survivors came to the conclusion that the stormy weather was the sole cause of the sinking, an explanation that some, including Galiano's first officer (Note: The first officer was one of the crew members who was left at Esquimalt due to being ill with the Spanish flu) and the shipmaster of her sister ship Malaspina, expressed doubt in. Some suggest that Pope, who had gained a reputation of being an overly-cautious captain, possibly due to being reprimanded for grounding Galiano on two occasions, (Note: One of these incidents almost led to him being relieved of his command, and eventually had him lose two years of seniority) may have feared anchoring at the island due to the risk of grounding Galiano in the approaching storm, leading him to make the dangerous return trip to the preferable anchoring site of Ikeda.

== Legacy ==
The Naval Memorial in Ross Bay Cemetery, Vancouver Island, British Columbia bears the names of 39 officers and ratings who were lost at sea. Of these, 36 were from HMCS Galiano, which sank on 30 October 1918.

In honour of Galiano and her crew, Canadian Forces Fleet School Esquimalt (CFFS(E)) named its damage control training facility after the lost ship. Located in Colwood, British Columbia, DCTF Galiano houses multiple-storey flood and fire simulators and utilizes complex freshwater flooding and propane fire systems. The simulators are designed as realistic mock-ups of Canadian naval vessels to provide controlled emergency environments in which sailors are trained to respond to ruptured pipes, flooding compartments, engine-room fires, aircraft crashes, and electrical emergencies.

== Sources ==
- James, Rick (2011). West Coast Wrecks & Other Maritime Tales. Raincoast Chronicles. Vol. 21. Vancouver: Harbour Publishing. ISBN 978-1-55017-545-5.
- Johnston, William; Rawling, William G.P.; Gimblett, Richard H. & MacFarlane, John (2010). The Seabound Coast: The Official History of the Royal Canadian Navy, 1867–1939. Vol. 1. Toronto: Dundurn Press. ISBN 978-1-55488-908-2.
- Macpherson, Ken & Barrie, Ron (2002). The Ships of Canada's Naval Forces 1910–2002 (Third ed.). St. Catharines, Ontario: Vanwell Publishing. ISBN 1-55125-072-1.
- Maginley, Charles D. & Collin, Bernard (2001). The Ships of Canada's Marine Services. St. Catharines, Ontario: Vanwell Publishing Limited. ISBN 1-55125-070-5.
- "Galiano (1136047)". Miramar Ship Index.
