= Powell Lake =

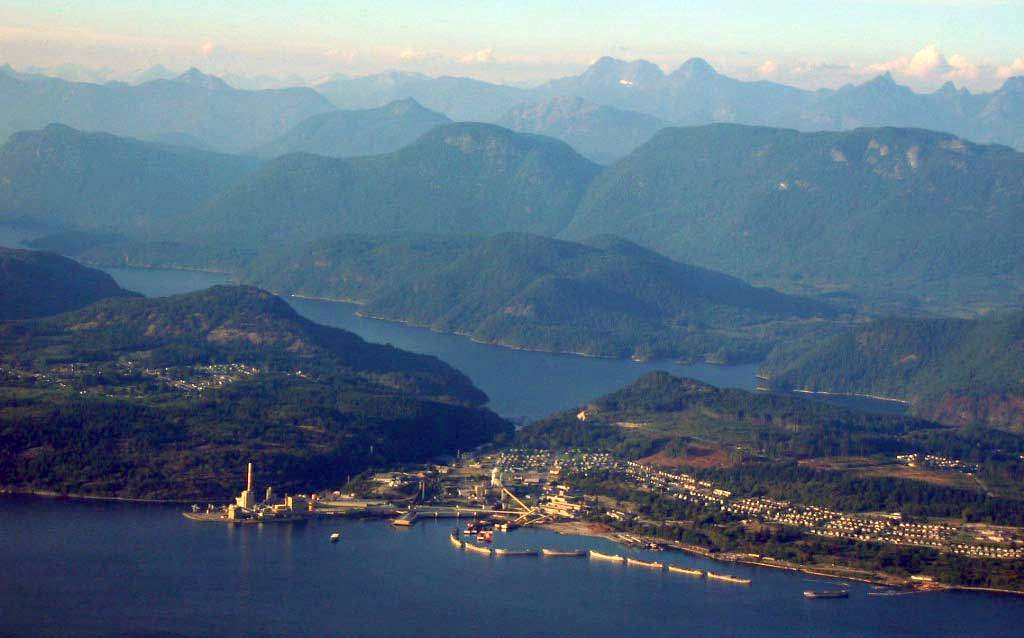
- Aerial view of Powell Lake and the city of Powell River

- Location within British Columbia
- Location: Sunshine Coast, British Columbia
- Coordinates: 50°05′00″N 124°25′00″W
- Type: fjord lake, meromictic, reservoir
- Primary inflows: Powell River, Eldred River, Daniels River, Beartooth Creek and Olsen Creek
- Primary outflows: Powell River
- Basin countries: Canada
- Max. length: 50 km (31 mi)
- Surface area: 120 km^{2} (46 sq mi)
- Average depth: 150 m (490 ft)
- Max. depth: 360 m (1,180 ft)
- Water volume: 18 km^{3} (4.3 cu mi)
- Surface elevation: 56 m (184 ft)
- Islands: Goat Island
- Settlements: Powell River

Powell Lake is a lake in the northern Sunshine Coast region of British Columbia, Canada, adjacent to the city of Powell River, which sits on the low rise of land forming a natural dam between the lake and the Strait of Georgia at 46 metres above sea level. The lake flows to the ocean through Powell River and features Goat Island, a large mountainous island. It serves as a reservoir for a small hydroelectric generating station which was built to serve the city's paper mill; and also as a water supply for that paper mill. Construction of the hydroelectric dam began in 1910, and in 1924 the lake's water level was raised to 56 metres above sea level.

The lake consists of six interconnected basins, two of which are meromictic, containing trapped salt water in the bottom 50 metres of the water column. Approximately 11,000 years ago, due to post-glacial rebound, the bedrock sill at the mouth of the fjord began to rise, isolating the basin from the Strait of Georgia.

== Name origin ==
The ʔayʔaǰuθəm (ey-ajoothum) name for the lake is θaʔyɛɬ (tha-yelh), meaning "freshwater lake." The English namesake is believed to be Dr. Israel Wood Powell, who is also believed to be the namesake for the nearby Powell River and city of Powell River. The city has recognized Dr. Powell as the namesake for the city and nearby geographic features since at least 1946, when Dr. Powell's daughters presented a portrait of their father to one of the local high schools.

== Indigenous history ==
The Tla’amin people lived near the mouth of the lake in a village called tiskʷat, prior to European settlement. They were forcibly removed in the 1880s.

== See also ==
- List of lakes of British Columbia
