= Homalco First Nation =

First Nations government located in Bute Inlet, British Columbia, Canada

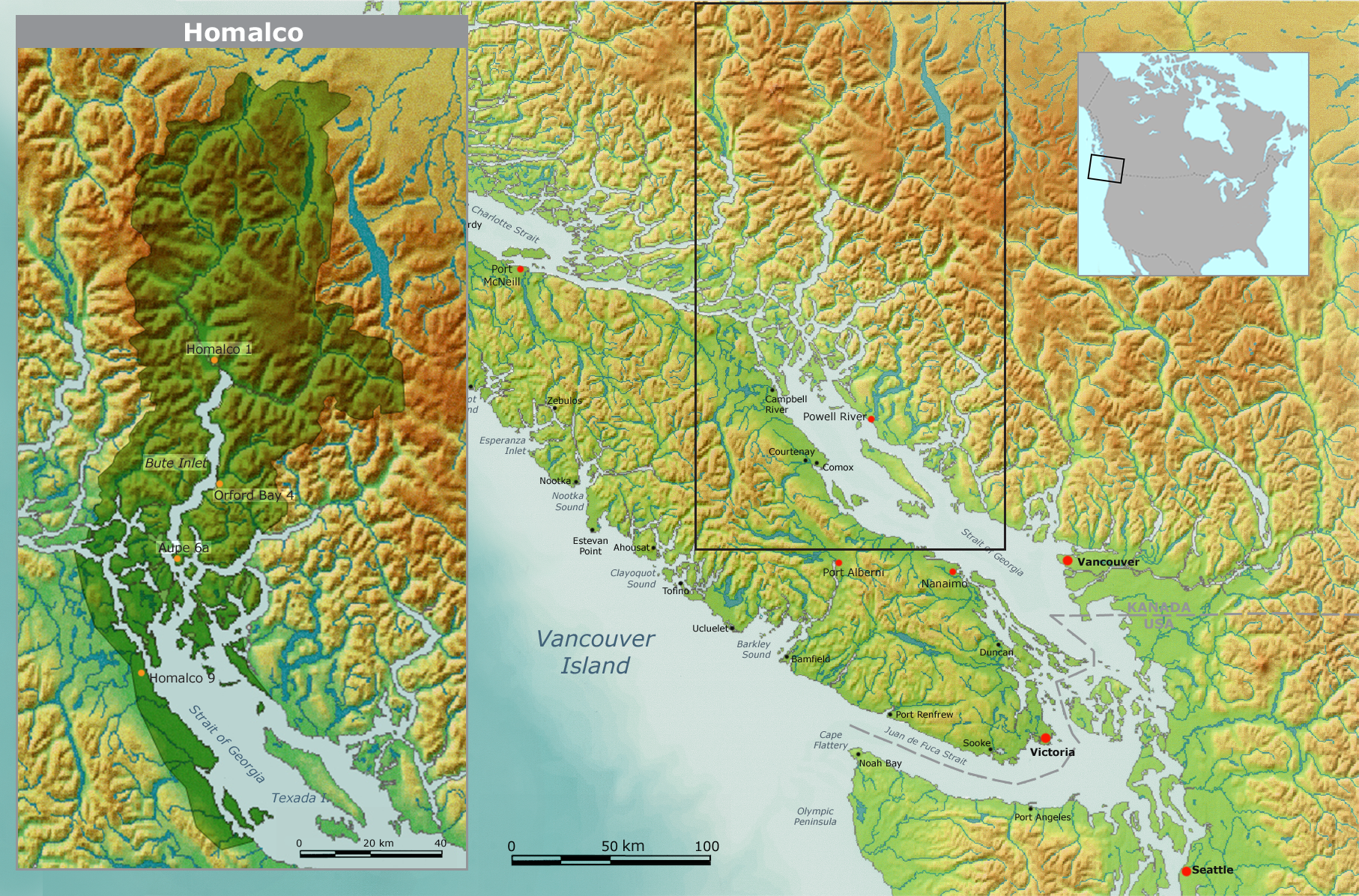
Region occupied by the Homalco First Nation

Homalco First Nation (Comox language: Xwémalhkwu, also spelled χʷɛmaɬku) is a First Nations government located in Bute Inlet near the upper Sunshine Coast of British Columbia, Canada. The Homalco are also known, with their neighbours the Tla'amin, Klahoose and the K'ómoks First Nations of nearby parts of Vancouver Island, as the Mainland Comox. Their ancestral tongue is the ʔayʔajuθəm language.

Homalco First Nation is a member government of the Naut'sa mawt Tribal Council.

== See also ==
- Comox language
