= Tlaʼamin Nation =

First Nations band in British Columbia, Canada

- Band No. 554
- Comox: ɬəʔamɛn'
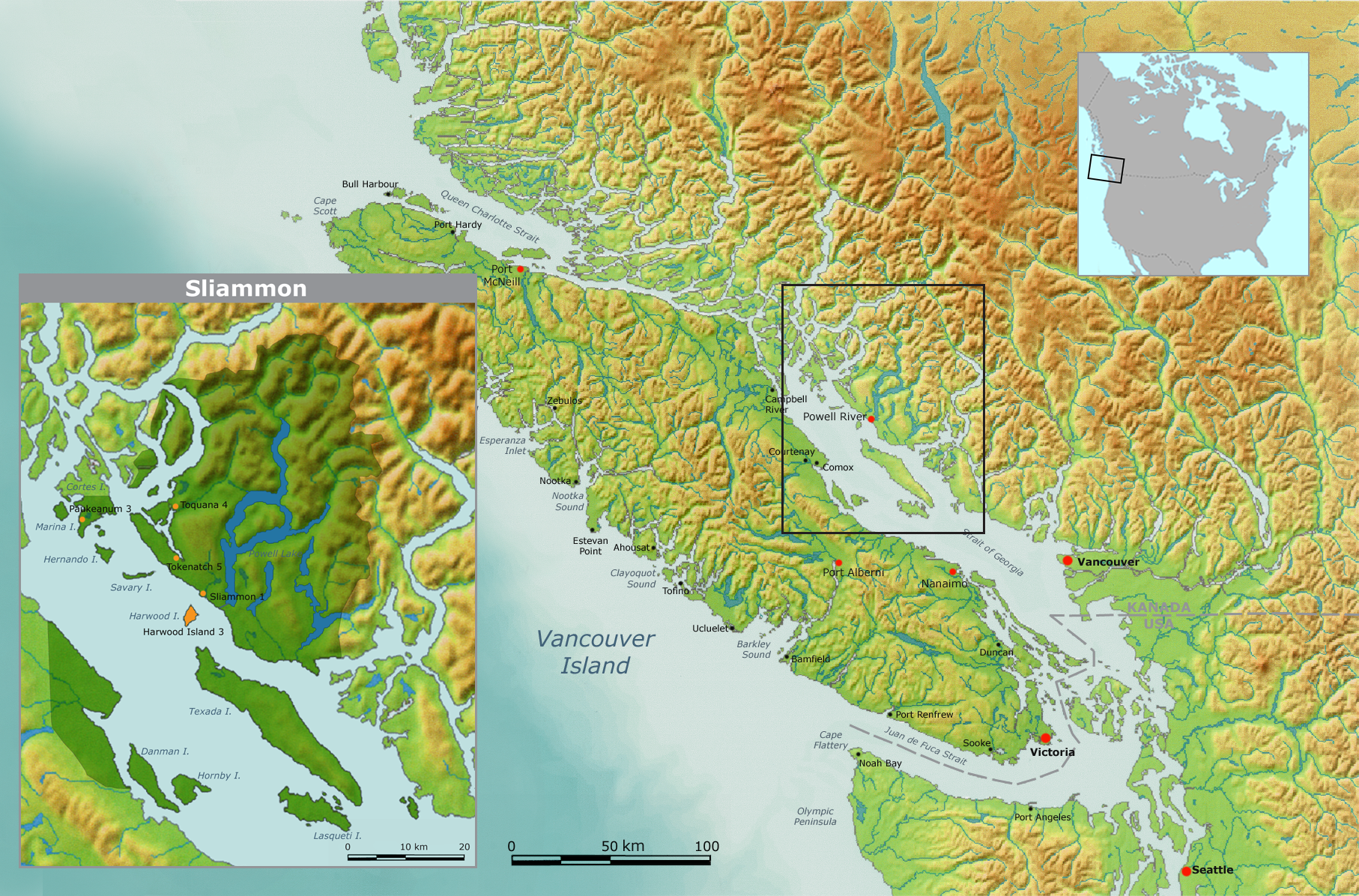
- Map of Tlaʼamin Traditional Territory
- People: Coast Salish
- Headquarters: Powell River
- Province: British Columbia

Population (2025)
- On reserve: 617
- On other land: 16
- Off reserve: 618
- Total population: 1251

Tribal Council
- Nautʼsa mawt Tribal Council

Website
- www.tlaaminnation.com

Tlaʼamin First Nation (Comox language: ɬəʔamɛn), formerly Sliammon Indian Band or Sliammon First Nation, is a First Nations self governing nation whose lands and traditional territories are located on the upper Sunshine Coast in southwestern British Columbia, Canada. The Tlaʼamin are closely related to the Klahoose and Homalco peoples and have shared their adjoining territories; formerly all three as well as K'omoks were grouped collectively as the Mainland Comox due to their shared language.

The territory of the Tlaʼamin people extends from the vicinity of Stillwater and the northern part of Texada Island, northward along the Malaspina and Gifford Peninsulas to the southern area of Homfray Channel and part of Cortes Island, including also the smaller off-shore islands such as Hernando, Savary and Harwood as well as Powell, Goat and Haslam Lakes.

Their ancestral tongue is ʔayʔaǰuθəm (Ay-A-Ju-Thum) which is shared with the Klahoose, Homalco & Kʼomoks peoples. Historically, the Tlaʼamin, Klahoose and Homalco were all one people with no borders or separation. The three communities shared the village of q̓aq̓ɛyq̓ay (Grace Harbour) during the winter months and practiced the winter ceremonies that were held by the Coast Salish peoples. The use of Sxwayxwey masks, ceremonial songs and dances and potlatching and feasting were common here. Today, Tlaʼamin's main village lies at t̓išosəm which translates to 'milky waters from herring spawn'. The Nation has over 1100 registered members and about half reside on Tlaʼamin lands.

The community has been growing over the years and include the brand new Tlaʼamin Governance House, A Health Centre, Ahms Tah Ow school, Chi-Chuy (Daycare/Pre-School), Two Soccer Fields, Tlaʼamin Salish Centre (gymnasium used as the community hall), Development Corporation offices and more.

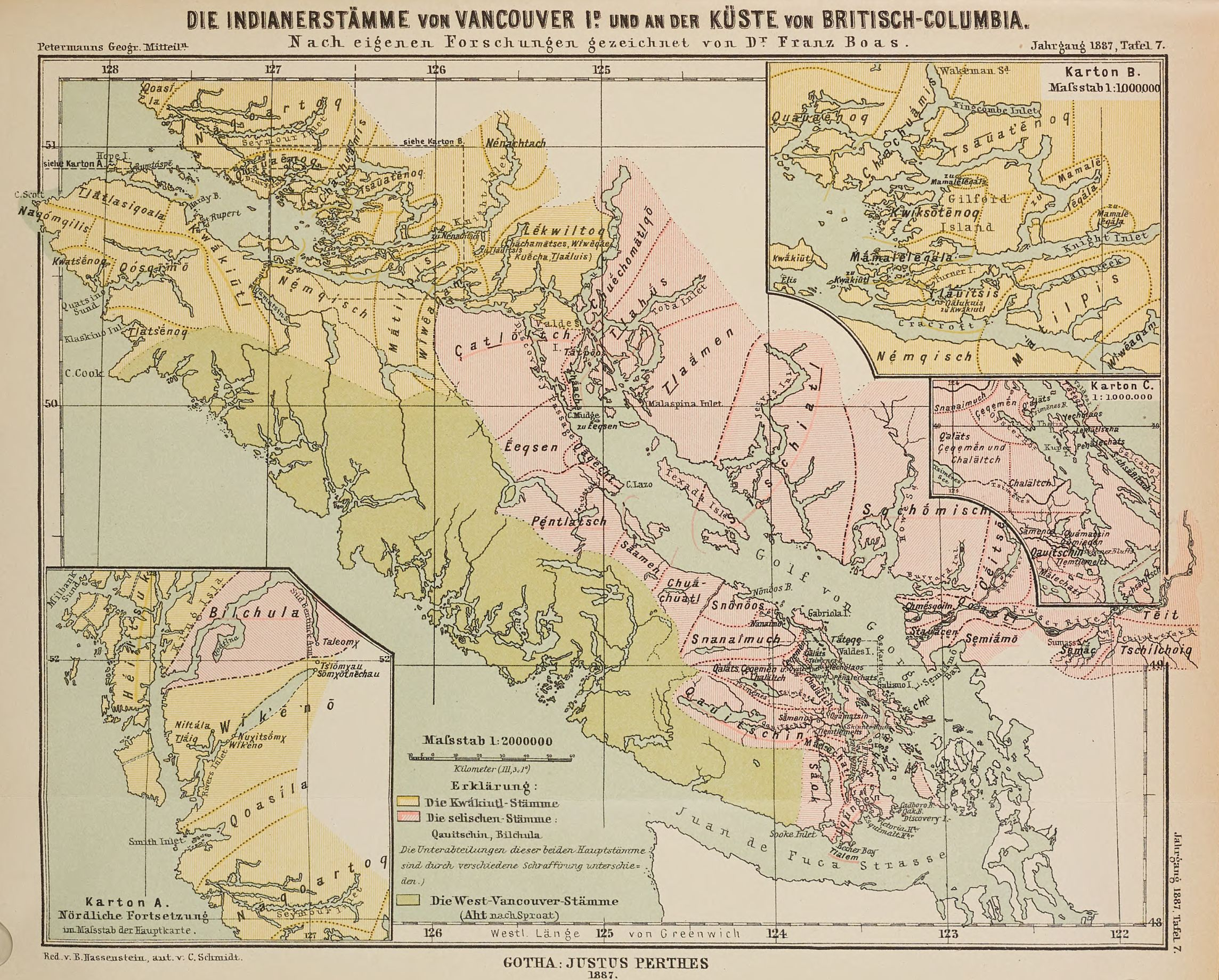
Dr. Franz Boas 1887 map showing Sliammon language speaking territories

== History ==
The Tla'amin people have thousands of years of history on the lands in which they call home. Through their connection to the land, the Tla'amin have a rich culture that has been passed down through generations of learning. The Tla'amin people are a part of the greater Northern Coast Salish peoples which also include the ƛoʔos (Klahoose), χʷɛmaɬku (Homalco) & K'omoks.

Other traditional village sites occupied by the Tla'amin include:

- toqʷanan - Theodosia Inlet
- toxʷnač - Okeover Inlet
- p̓aq̓iʔaǰɩm - Maple Village, Cortes Island
- ʔagayqsən - Ahgykson Island (Harwood)
- qʷoqʷnɛs - Stillwater
- χakʷum - Grief Point
- t̓atlaχʷnač - Blubber Bay

== Treaty & self government ==
In 1994, the Sliammon Indian Band submitted a Statement of Intent to begin negotiations with the Government of Canada, and province of British Columbia to establish a treaty. The process lasted 22 years for the Tla'amin Nation, who are now a self-governing treaty nation.

1994: Sliammon enters Stage One of the BC Treaty Process with a Statement of Intent.

1996: Sliammon enters into Stage Two of the BC Treaty Process.

1996: Sliammon enters Stage Three of the BC Treaty Process.

2001: A community vote was held in 2001 on an agreement in principle. This was a split vote – 51% voted no while 49% voted yes.

2003: Again the community voted in 2003 on an agreement in principle and this passed by 63% yes and 37% no.

2011: Tla'amin, Canada and BC Initial Final Agreement

2014: The Tla'amin Final Agreement was given royal assent in British Columbia on March 14, 2014.

June 16, 2012: Initial vote on the Tla'amin Final Agreement blocked by protesters.

April 5, 2016: At midnight, the Tla'amin Nation became a self-governing nation after the implementation of the Tla'amin Final Agreement.

The Tla'amin First Nation is a member government of the Naut'sa mawt Tribal Council. Their offices are located in the town of Powell River.

== See also ==
- Comox language
