= Comox language =

Endangered Salishan language spoken in British Columbia

Comox
- Comox-Sliammon, Sliammon
- ʔayʔajuθəm
- Native to: Canada
- Region: British Columbia
- Ethnicity: 2,037 Comox people in 3 of 4 communities (2018, FPCC).
- Native speakers: 47 in 3 of 4 communities, unknown number in 4th community (2018, FPCC)
- Language family: Salishan: Coast Salish; Central; Comox
- Dialects: Island (Kʼómoks) †; Mainland (Sliammon–Klahoose–Homalco)
- Writing system: NAPA

Language codes
- ISO 639-3: coo
- Glottolog: como1259 Comox isla1276 Island Comox slia1241 Sliammon
- ELP: Éy7á7juuthem (Comox)
- A map of Coast Salish languages in the Pacific Northwest Sliammon Homalco Klahoose

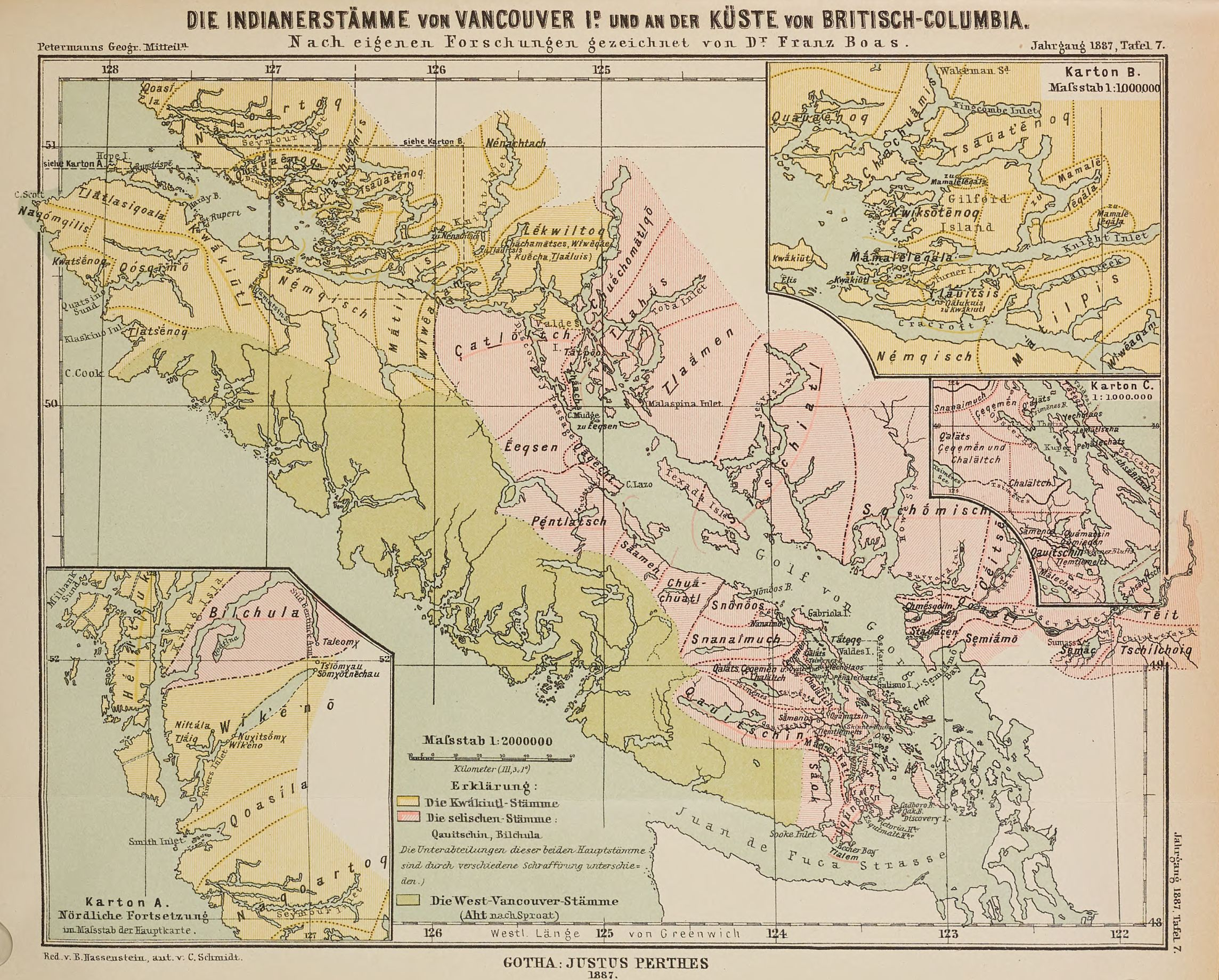
Dr. Franz Boas 1887 map showing Comox language speaking territories

Comox (Mainland Comox: ʔayʔajuθəm; Island Comox: ʔayʔajusəm) is a Coast Salish language historically spoken in the northern Georgia Strait region, spanning the east coast of Vancouver Island and the northern Sunshine Coast and adjoining inlets and islands. More specifically, ʔayʔajuθəm was traditionally spoken in Bute Inlet (also known as Church House), in Squirrel Cove (also known as Cortes Island), and in Sliammon, located in the area now known as Powell River.

The term K̓omoks is not originally a Comox word, but rather a Kwak'wala term meaning "plenty", "abundance", or "wealth”. It initially was used for the Island Comox from the area now known as Comox Indian Reserve No. 1 but it used by linguists for the language and all those speaking this language. ʔayʔajuθəm means “speaking well.”

== Status ==
As of 1983, only two L1 speakers of the Island Comox were surviving, an aunt born in 1900, Mary Clifton, and niece, Irene Wilson.

Powell River, Campbell River, and Cortes island have started projects to help save ʔayʔajuθəm. Children in daycare and preschool are being taught ʔayʔajuθəm in schools on Cortes Island, Campbell River (the current city where many of the Homalco people have resettled) and is now being taught in school district #47 (Powell River). ʔayʔajuθəm is also being accepted as a second language that fulfills graduation requirements. In Powell River, ʔayʔajuθəm is taught from daycare through grade 12.

A community accord was signed in 2003 between Tla'amin First Nation and the municipality of Powell River. The municipality of Powell River has started to place the traditional Tla'amin place names in addition to the settler names on signs found throughout the district.

A Tla'amin iPhone app was released in March 2012. An online dictionary, phrasebook, and language learning portal is available at First Voices. In addition to the First Voices site, there are ʔayʔajuθəm dictionaries from the Tla'amin and Homalco Nations, CDs containing ʔayʔajuθəm and children's books containing the ʔayʔajuθəm language are available throughout Powell River, Campbell River, and Cortes Island.

Many Tla'amin, Klahoose and Homalco Nation members do not identify as Comox, and Comox is seen by many separate and more closely linked to the Kwakwaka'wakw people as Comox people speak this language. Island Comox became very rare in the late 1800s as Lekwiltok became the more common language spoken by the island Comox. In a later publication, Kennedy and Bouchard (1990), stated that, whether as an L1 or L2, "in the 1980s, Mainland Comox continued being spoken fluently by about one-third of the population and was the most viable of all Salishan languages" (Kennedy and Bouchard, 443). Czaykowska-Higgins and Kinkade (1990) reported in the same year that the number of Island Comox speakers was one, while the mainland Tla'amin maintained less than 400 (64). Today, Ethnologue estimates that there are roughly 40 speakers of Catlotlq, the majority of whom are L2 speakers. Ethnologue also lists Catlotlq as being ranked at an 8 on the Fishman scale of language loss severity, which reads: "most vestigial users of Xish are socially isolated old folks and Xish needs to be reassembled from their mouths and memories and taught to demographically unconcentrated adults".

== Dialects ==
It has two main dialects, Island Comox, associated with the K'ómoks First Nation, and Mainland Comox. Whereas there Comox speaks (Vancouver Island) Island dialect, the Sliammon, Klahoose, and Homalco peoples speak ʔayʔajuθəm, which is referred to by some as "Mainland Comox dialect". As of 2012, the Island Comox dialect has no remaining speakers.

== Phonology ==
=== Consonants ===
The consonants of Comox are depicted below in IPA and in orthography where it differs from IPA.

		Labial	Dental	Alveolar			Palatal	Velar		Uvular		Glottal
		Labial	Dental	median	sibilant	lateral	Palatal	plain	labial	plain	labial	Glottal
Stop^{1}	plain	p	t͜θ ⟨tᶿ⟩	t	t͜s ⟨c⟩	t͜ɬ ⟨ƛ⟩	t͜ʃ ⟨č⟩	k	kʷ	q	qʷ	
Stop^{1}	ejective	pʼ ⟨p̓⟩	t͜θʼ ⟨t̓ᶿ⟩	tʼ ⟨t̓⟩	t͜sʼ ⟨c̓⟩	t͜ɬʼ ⟨ƛ̓⟩	t͜ʃʼ ⟨č̓⟩	kʼ ⟨k̓⟩	kʷʼ ⟨k̓ʷ⟩	qʼ ⟨q̓⟩	qʷʼ ⟨q̓ʷ⟩	ʔ
Stop^{1}	voiced						d͜ʒ ⟨j⟩^{2}	ɡ^{2}				
Fricative			θ		s	ɬ ⟨ɬ⟩	ʃ ⟨š⟩	x^{3}	xʷ	χ ⟨χ⟩	χʷ ⟨χʷ⟩	h
Sonorant	plain	m		n		l^{3}	j ⟨y⟩		w			
Sonorant	glottalized	mˀ ⟨m̓⟩		nˀ ⟨n̓⟩		lˀ ⟨l̓⟩^{3}	jˀ ⟨y̓⟩		wˀ ⟨w̓⟩			

^1 The stops and affricates are grouped together for simplification purposes.
^2 Contrasts only on the surface.
^3 Occur probably only in borrowings and/or onomatopoetic words.

=== Vowels ===
	Front	Central	Back
Close	i		o
Mid		ʌ	
Open	e		a

==== Allophony ====
/i/ may be pronounced:

- [i] between ⟨ɫ⟩, palatal or velar (except for ⟨w⟩), non-glottalized consonants; between such a consonant and a final word boundary. There are also a certain number of grammatical environments where the tense form of the high front vowel is required.
- [e] after a ⟨w, w̓⟩, uvular or glottal consonant.
- [ɪ] elsewhere

/e/ may be pronounced:

- [e] in the same conditions as [i].
- [ɛ] elsewhere

/u/ may be pronounced:

- [u] in the same conditions as [i].
- [o] elsewhere

/a/ may be pronounced:

- [æ] between ⟨ɫ⟩, palatal or velar (except for ⟨w⟩) consonants.
- [a] elsewhere

/ʌ/ may be pronounced:

- [i] before a ⟨y⟩.
- [ɪ] after a ⟨ɫ⟩, palatal or velar (except for ⟨w⟩) consonant.
- [ʊ] following a velar rounded consonant (except for ⟨w⟩).
- [ə] elsewhere.
- [o] before a ⟨w⟩.
- [ɔ] after a ⟨w, w̓⟩ or uvular rounded consonant.
- [a] stressed before a ⟨w, w̓⟩ or uvular consonant.

== Alphabet ==
Comox uses an Americanist-based alphabet devised by H. R. Harris II and D. I. Kennedy. The multiple vowel letters are not all distinct sounds.

a æ aw ay ɔ č č̓ e ɛ ə əw əy g gʸ h i ɩ j k k̓ kʷ k̓ʷ kʸ k̓ʸ l l̓ ɬ ƛ ƛ̓ m m̓ n n̓ o ɔy p p̓ q q̓ qʷ q̓ʷ s š t t̓ θ tᶿ t̓ᶿ u ʊ w w̓ χ χʷ xʷ y y̓ ʔ

== Morphology ==
"Salishan languages are highly polysynthetic, employing numerous suffixes and reduplication patterns; prefixes and infixes are less numerous. Words often include lexical suffixes referring to concrete physical objects or abstract extensions from them."

Comox has essentially lost all derivational prefixes. It is the only language in the Salish family to have lost the nominalizing prefix s- from its morphological inventory (Kroeber 11). However, the morphologically mirrored -s interestingly serves as a marker for 3rd person possession (Kroeber 111). Hagège has found certain cases where both the prefixive s- and the suffixive -s occur in circumspection. Kroeber is wary to support the finding, but offers the following: "This would appear to be a complex of the nominalizing prefix s- and the third person possessive -s; that is, the third person form of the sort of nominalized construction widely used for subordination in Salish."(Kroeber 115).

In his review of Hagège's grammar of the language, Paul D. Kroeber states, "After diminutive CV reduplication, all CVC roots lose their vowel, regardless of what the vowel is." Kroeber gives the following example: wot'-o-t 'bend it', wo-wt'-o-t 'bend it a little bit'.

The affixes representing possession in Comox are much different than those of their Salishan counterparts. 1st person singular (ç-) and plural (ms-) and 2nd person singular (θ-) appear as prefixes, while 2nd person plural (-ap) and 3rd person (-s) appear as suffixes.

== Grammatical categories ==
=== Number ===
"Reduplicated counting forms with explicit reference to 'people' can be found in a large number of different Salish languages. All the basic formal shapes of reduplication in Salish (CVC-, CV-, and –VC) may be used to create the 'people' counting forms." (412).

Comox numbers for 'people':

- 1 – páʔa
- 2 – sáʔa
- 3 – čálas
- 4 – mus
- 5 – síyačix
- 6 – t'áxam
- 7 – c'oʔčis
- 8 – táʔčis
- 9 – tígyixw
- 10 – úpan

Comox uses CV reduplication to mark its 'people' counting forms (419–420).

- pí-paʔa ('1 person')
- sí-saʔa ('2 people')

=== Control ===
"Control [volitional] may be seen as marking the subject of the verb as a prototypical agent: the subject wants the event to occur and has the capabilities that would normally ensure that (s)he could bring about the desired event. Noncontrol [nonvolitional] signals that the subject departs in some way from prototypical agentivity; the event occurs accidentally or is something that the subject did only with difficulty."

tʼuçʼ-ut-as
shoot-CTR-3Sb
'he shot it (on purpose), tried to shoot it'

tʼuçʼ-əxʷ-as
shoot-NTR-3Sb
'he shot it (accidentally), managed to shoot it'

The inceptive reduplication of Comox is closely tied to the marking of control. In words like tih 'big', -VC reduplicates to create the inceptive form tih-ih 'get big'. Control is then marked by further affixation: "The CTr suffix regularly has the form -at after –VC".

xʷah-at-uɫ č tih-ih-at-as
tell-CTR-Past 1sSb big-VC-CTR-3Sb
'I told him to make it big'

=== Duratives ===
"The durative is used for activities carried out over an extended period or habitually, such as a means of employment" (Mithun 168). Thus, duratives demonstrate intervallic aspect. Here is an example of a durative in Comox:

xʷuxʷ-mut ʔuɫqʷu
long.time-very dig.clams
'he dug clams for a long time'

=== Inceptive ===
"An inceptive prefix can mark the gradual, beginning stages of an event or state" (Mithun 169). In Comox, this is largely achieved through –VC reduplication. The following example illustrates this process:

- pəs-əs 'get numb' (pəs 'numb')
- tih-ih 'get big' (tih 'big')

=== Syntax ===
As is the case for all Salish languages, Comox is predicate-initial. Czaykowski-Higgins and Kinkade (1998) state, "VSO (verb-subject-object) is most commonly said to be the preferred word order in most Salish languages, with postpredicate word order nevertheless being fairly free" (37). Kroeber (1999) confirms this information and expounds upon it by stating, "in all Salish languages, the predicate is most often clause-initial, followed by nominal expressions and prepositional phrases coding participants in the event" (37). He further notes that prepositional phrases generally represent obliques, leaving subjects and objects unmarked (38).

=== Word classification ===
In addition to the loss of derivational prefixes, Comox has also lost the nominalizer prefix in many of its uses. Further, there is extant ambiguity as to the ability – or need – to classify certain words as 'noun' or 'verb' within the Salish family. An example of the uncertainty is the word ʔiɬtən, which can appear as both a noun and a verb, and is identified through the results of its affixation. Kroeber (1999) provides the following example:

verb:

ʔiɬtən	ʔiɬtən‿čxʷ
'eat'	'you eat'

noun:

ʔiɬtən	tə‿ʔiɬtən-s
'food'	'his/her food'

The word ʔiɬtən in these examples is semantically similar though grammatically contrasted. The suffixation present in the first instance marks the word as a verb and also indicates person, in this case the second. The prefix and suffix in the latter instance nominalize the word, possession designated as seen earlier by the suffix -s (34–35).

=== Complements of negative predicates ===
In Coast Salish languages, all but Squamish feature subject-predicate mirroring – a sort of clausal concord – in person and number. To illustrate this point, here are examples from Catlotlq and Squamish:

Catlotlq –

xʷaʔ‿č qəjiy-an p'ap'im
not‿1s.SU.CL still-1s.CJ.SU work
'I'm not still working'

Squamish –

háw q‿ʔan‿c'ic'áp ti‿scíʔs
not IRR‿1s.CJ.SU‿work ART‿today
'I do not work today'

In the Catlotlq example, the negating predicate assumes the same person and number as the subject. Conversely, the Squamish negating predicate remains unmarked. The difference between Squamish and Coast Salish languages in this case, is the irrealis marker q- on the subject, a common feature of non-Salish languages.

=== Oblique ===
Like its fellow Coast Salish languages, Catlotlq utilizes a single preposition, ʔə, to mark the oblique (Kroeber, 45). Below are two examples:

pəqʷs-a-t-as ʔə‿tə‿qaʔya
enter.water-LV-TR-3.TR.SU OBL‿ART‿water
'He dropped it in the water'

hu‿št‿əm xapj-a-mi (ʔə)‿kʷə‿θ‿tuwa
go‿1p.SU.CL‿FUT return-TR-2s.OB OBL‿ART‿2s.PO‿be.from
'We will send you back to where you came from'

Interestingly, the oblique marker in these examples also serves a locative purpose, identifying where the object was dropped and the individual's original orientation. The subjects and objects in both phrases are, true to form, unmarked by preposition.

=== Transitivity ===
Transitivity in Catlotlq has several suffix paradigms. With respect to one of these paradigms, Harris states, "object suffixes preced[ing] subject suffixes" (50). He offers first a list of object pronouns as they appear with transitive roots and then gives examples of each of them in their respective environments.

The objective pronouns on transitive roots are:

	singular	plural
1st person	-s-	-tulmoɫ-
2nd person	-sɪ-	-tanapi-
3rd person	-t-	-t(ʌw?)-

Applied to the root 'called':

1. yáɫasʌs He called me.
2. yáɫasɪs He called you.
3. yáɫatʰčan I called him.
4. yáɫatulmoɫʌs He called us.
5. yáɫatanapɪs He called you.
6. yáɫatewʔčan I called them.

In relation to transitivity, Catlotlq also demonstrates the benefactive suffix with the suffix ʔʌm (Harris, 52). Following the objective pronouns given in the previous example, the next set of data (Harris, 53) illustrates the benefactive suffix:

1. sɪqʔʌmsas He dug it for me.
2. sɪqʔʌmsɪs He dug it for you.
3. sɪqʔʌmtas He dug it for him.
4. sɪqʔʌmtulmoɫas He dug it for us.
5. sɪqʔʌmtanapɪs He dug it for you (pl.).
6. sɪqʔʌmtasewʔ He dug it for them.

Mithun (1999) explains: "A benefactive applicative allows beneficiaries to be cast as direct objects" (247). Thus, the transitivity not only denotes direction, but a benefactor and the recipient.

=== Tense ===
==== Future ====
Harris (1981) states, "there are three explicit tenses in Comox: the past, the present, and the future" (72). He first looks at the future tense marked by the morpheme -sʌm, noting that "if the preceding pronoun ends in a [t] the [s] is dropped" (73).

1. tahathčxwsʌm tʌ kyutʌn
  You'll feed the horse.
2. hojoth čtʌm tʌms qaɫʌm
  We'll finish the job.
3. sɪqʔʌmčʌpsʌm ʌkʷ qaʔʌya
  You'll dig the well
4. yaqašsʌm tʌ cɪxcɪk
  He'll use the wagon.

Harris continues by stating that if the future morpheme occurs after [č], the [č] becomes [c] and the [s] is dropped (73).

5. mat' atʰcʌm tʌ λ'ʌms
  I'll paint the house.

==== Past ====
The underlying form of the past tense is marked by the morpheme, ʔoɫ, with surface forms including that mentioned and oɫ, the latter occurring after consonants (73). The following list shows the past tense in its various phonological environments:

1. kʷačxʷi yʌqtoɫ
  Have you bought that?
2. kʷačxʷ kʌmgyxʷoɫ
  Did you meet him?
3. kyakyačoɫčʌtʰ
  We were playing cards.
4. xʌypʌnomsoɫčaxʷ
  You startled me.
5. xanaseʔoɫč ʔɪšɪms č'aʔʌnuʔ
  I gave you our dog.
6. soʔoɫč ʌkʷʰ ʔahkʷtʰ
  I went downstream.
7. tihʔoɫčxʷ
  You were big.

==== Present ====
Harris concludes his treatment of tense by stating, "the present in Comox is the unmarked tense although it is not clear that every unmarked predicate has the force of the present as an explicit factor of meaning" (76). That is, the lack of marking presents a certain amount of ambiguity as to the designation of tense.

=== Lexical suffixes ===
Lexical suffixes in Salishan languages have referential meaning. That is, "they refer to things as body parts, shapes and concrete objects, and are part of the semantic derivation of a stem" (116). In the next two sections of examples, suffix referents to body parts and objects will be presented. The English gloss for jɪšɪn is 'foot, leg' but the referential suffix is the truncated -šɪn, which appears in the following (117):

1. qʷasšɪnč I burnt my foot
2. λ'ešɪn Fast
3. paʔašɪn Crane(one-legged)

A truncated -ɫaɫ similarly assumes the role of sáyɫaɫ or 'neck' in the following (117):

1. qʷasɫaɫč I burnt my neck
2. totxʷɫaɫ Necklace

Lastly, here are examples of mʎqsɪn ('nose') whose referential suffix, -ɛqʷ, bears no orthographic semblance to its root (118–119):

1. čaʔʌjeʌmɛqʷ to have an itchy nose
2. λʌsseʌqʷsɪcʌm I'm going to hit you on the nose
3. tihhɛqʷ big nose

In the case of object reference, some lexical suffixes have the single affix form, though many also derive from a root. The former is the case for identification of containers with the suffix -ayi (119):

1. lamayi bottle (liquor(rum)-container)
2. jamayi jar (jam-container)

The object referential suffix for canoe derives from the root nʌxʷíɫ and surfaces as -ʌgɪɫ (120):

1. qʌxʷʌqɪɫ left side of a canoe
2. ʔaʔʌjumʌqɪɫ right side of a canoe

== Bibliography ==
- Sapir, Edward (1915). Noun reduplication in Comox, a Salish language of Vancouver island. Ottawa: Government Printing Office.
- Kroeber, Paul D. (January 1989). "Le comox lhaamen de Colombie Britannique: Présentation d'une langue amérindienne . Claude Hagège". International Journal of American Linguistics. 55 (1): 106–116. doi:10.1086/466109. ISSN 0020-7071.
