= Powell River (British Columbia) =

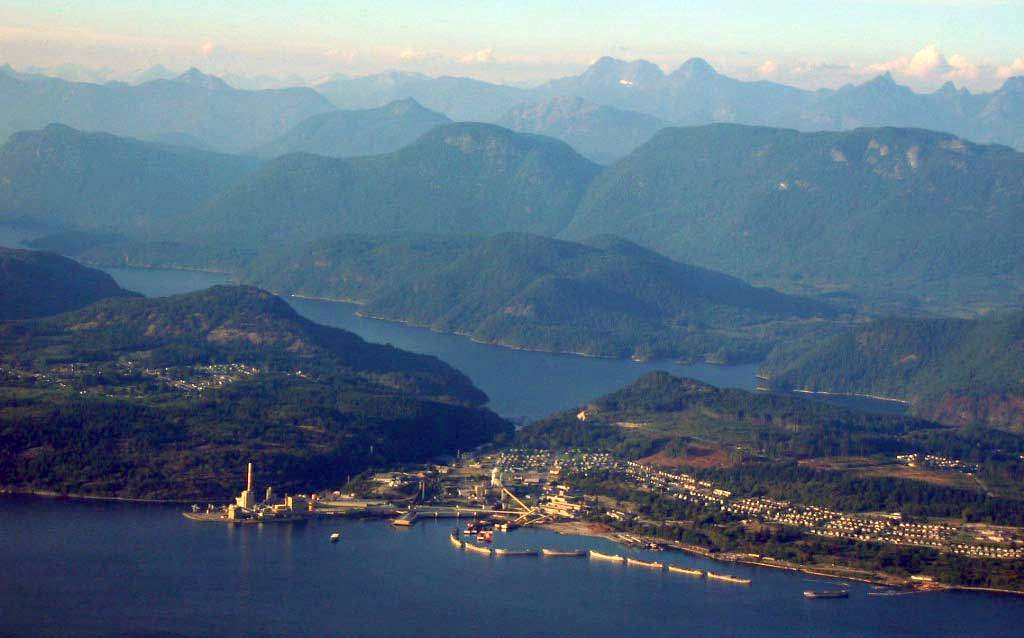
- Aerial photograph of Powell River

- Mouth of Powell River

Location
- Country: Canada
- Province: British Columbia
- District: New Westminster Land District

Physical characteristics
- Mouth: Powell River
  - location: Strait of Georgia
  - coordinates: 49°52′32″N 124°33′35″W
  - elevation: 0 m (0 ft)

The Powell River is a river in the northern Sunshine Coast region of British Columbia, Canada, that flows a short distance through the eponymous city of Powell River, British Columbia to enter the Salish Sea. It is one of the shortest rivers in the world, measuring 500 metres (1,600 ft) in length.

== Name origin ==
The English namesake is Israel Wood Powell, also the namesake of nearby Powell Lake and the city of Powell River. Powell was a medical doctor and educator who was a veteran of the Cariboo Gold Rush, and also Commissioner for Indian Affairs for British Columbia from 1873 to 1881.

== See also ==
- List of rivers of British Columbia
