= Howell (name) =

Surname and given name of Welsh origin

- An example of a Howell family Coat of Arms: Gules, three towers, tripled towered, argent. (the Coat of Arms for Edward Howell, Lord of Westbury)
- Pronunciation: English: /ˈhaʊəl/ HOW-əl; Welsh: [ˈhəu.ɛl]
- Language: Welsh

Origin
- Origin: Celtic, Old Welsh
- Meaning: "Eminent", "prominent"
- Region of origin: Wales, Great Britain
- Motto: Virtus in arduo (Latin for 'Valour in difficulty')

Other names
- Variant forms: Hoel, Howells, Howel, Howle Hugh, Hywel

Howell (/ˈhaʊəl/ HOW-əl, Welsh: [ˈhəu.ɛl]) is a surname and given name originating from Wales. It is an anglicised form of the Welsh name Hywel. It originates in a dynasty of kings in Wales and Brittany in the 9th and 10th-centuries, most notably king Hywel Dda ("Howel the Good") and three Welsh royal houses of that time onwards. The royal House of Tudor was also descended from them. Today, nearly 200,000 people bear this surname.

== Etymology and history ==
=== Welsh origin ===
The name Howell originates from the Welsh masculine given name, Hywel, meaning "eminent" or "prominent", derived from the Old Welsh given name, Higuel. Literally meaning, hy- (“good”) + gwêl (“sight”), "well-seen".

The first known recording of the name comes in the Anglo-Saxon Chronicle, referring to a Brittonic king known as Huwal of the West Welsh in 926 AD. Many scholars believe this to be referring to the 10th-century law giving Welsh king, Hywel Dda, to which many Howells claim their descent from. He is the most famous historical bearer of the name, and was recorded with the title King of the Britons by 950 AD.

Howell as a surname is derived from the name of an ancestor, meaning the "son of Hoel" (and variants). Its original Welsh form would use the prefix ap, for example: Owain ap Hywel ("Owain son of Hywel"). The Latin motto for the Howell family name is Virtus in arduo (variously translated as "Valour in difficulty", "Strength in difficulty" or "Virtue in difficulty"). Howell (and its variant forms) as a given name has been popular in honour of Hywel Dda since the Middle Ages.

In Geoffrey of Monmouth's 12th-century pseudohistorical Historia regum Britanniae, there is mention of a late 5th and early 6th-century Brittonic king known as Hywel the Great, said to be born in around 500 AD. This is the earliest claimed account of the name, although Hywel the Great is generally considered as legendary, he appears in Welsh mythology and the Matter of Britain as a "king of Brittany". He is considered a Welsh saint and was said to have been a relative of the legendary King Arthur.

=== In England ===
After the English Conquest of Wales in the 13th-century, followed by the Laws in Wales Acts 1535 and 1542 in the 16th-century, Wales was incorporated into the Kingdom of England. This resulted in the migration of Howells into Western England from Wales, particularly in counties along the Anglo-Welsh border. Many settlers anglicized their surnames from their original Welsh forms, such as "Hywel" to instead "Howell". In the Eastern English counties, the name was brought by Breton settlers after the Norman Conquest. The Breton forms of the name were Houuel, Huwel, Huwal, and Howael. There is also a claim for the surname having separate English origins, from the place-name Howell found in Lincolnshire and derived from the Old English, hugol meaning “mound” or “hillock.”

=== In the British Empire ===
As a result of English colonialism and subsequently, the British Empire, descendants of the Howell family name can be found across the world. Today, It is most prevalently found in the core Anglosphere countries, such as the United Kingdom, the United States, Canada, Australia and New Zealand. However, during the period of slavery in the British colonies, many slaves were known by the surname of their masters, or adopted those surnames upon their emancipation. Some descendants of these formerly enslaved peoples, continue to bear these surnames today, particularly in countries in the West Indies.

== Geographical distribution ==
As of 2014, over 74.0% of all known bearers of the surname Howell were residents of the United States, 12.3% are in the British Isles (10.4% in England, 1.3% in Wales, 0.2% in Scotland, 0.2% in Ireland, 0.2% in Northern Ireland) 4.6% in Australia, 3.0% in Canada, 1.7% in Jamaica, 0.8% in South Africa and 0.7% in New Zealand.

Country		1880-81	% of Howells	2014	% of Howells	% Pop. Change 1880–2014
(United States)	United States	22,965	64.5%	144,930	74.0%	+531.1%
(England)	England	10,134	28.5%	20,399	10.4%	+101.3%
(Wales)	Wales	2,373	6.7%	2,461	1.3%	+3.7%
(Australia)	Australia	no data	no data	9,137	4.6%	not applicable
(Canada)	Canada	no data	no data	5,968	3.0%	not applicable
(Jamaica)	Jamaica	no data	no data	3,344	1.7%	not applicable
(South Africa)	South Africa	no data	no data	1,669	0.8%	not applicable
(New Zealand)	New Zealand	no data	no data	1,320	0.7%	not applicable
Other countries		132	0.3%	6,558	3.3%	not applicable
Total		35,604	100%	195,786	100%	+449.9% (total)

Notable people with the name include:

== Surname ==
=== A ===
- Ada Verdun Howell (1902–1981), Australian author and poet
- Albert Howell (comedian), Canadian comedian and writer
- Albert Howell (cricketer) (1898–1958), English cricketer
- Alfred Brazier Howell (1886–1961), American zoologist, primarily a mammalogist
- Algie Howell (born 1938), American Democratic politician
- Alice Howell (1886–1961), American silent movie actress
- Anthony Howell (actor) (born 1971), British TV actor
- Anthony Howell (performance artist) (born 1945), British performance artist
- Arlene Howell (born 1939), American TV actress
- Arthur H. Howell (1872–1940), American zoologist
- Avery Howell (born 2006), Canadian basketball player

=== B ===
- Bailey Howell (born 1937), American basketball player
- Benny Howell (born 1988), English cricketer
- Benjamin Franklin Howell (1844–1933), American Republican politician
- Benjamin Hunting Howell (1875–unknown), American rower
- Beryl A. Howell (born 1956), American judge
- Bill Howell (American football) (1905–1981), American football player
- Bill Howell (cricketer) (1869–1940), Australian cricketer
- Blue Howell (1905–1964), American football player
- Brett Harland Howell, British musician
- Buddy Howell (born 1996), American football player

=== C ===
- C. Thomas Howell (born 1966), American actor
- Carla Howell (born 1955), American Libertarian politician
- Cashius Howell (born 2003), American football player
- Cedric Howell (1896–1919), Australian fighter pilot
- Charles Howell (British politician) (1905–1974), British Labour politician and member of Parliament
- Charles Howell III (born 1979), American golfer
- Charles Andrew Howell III (1930–2011), American businessman
- Charles Augustus Howell (1840–1890), British-Portuguese art dealer
- Charles Henry Howell (c. 1824 – 1905), British architect
- Charles R. Howell (1904–1973), American politician and member of the House of Representatives
- Charmaine Howell (born 1975), Jamaican athlete
- Christopher Howell (born 1945), American poet
- Christopher Howell (cricketer) (born 1977), English cricketer
- Clarence Howell (1881–1936), American chess master
- Clark Howell (1863–1936), American newspaperman and politician
- Clement Howell (1935–1987), Turks and Caicos politician
- Colin Howell (born 1959), Northern Irish murderer

=== D ===
- Daedalus Howell (born 1972), American writer
- Daniel Howell (born 1991), British vlogger and BBC Radio 1 presenter
- Daniel Howell (Wisconsin politician) (1807–1890), Wisconsin state senator
- David Howell, Baron Howell of Guildford (born 1936), British Conservative politician
- David Howell (British Army officer), British barrister and officer
- David Howell (chaplain) (1929–2017), Anglican priest and writer
- David Howell (chess player) (born 1990), British chess grandmaster
- David Howell (footballer) (born 1958), English footballer
- David Howell (golfer) (born 1975), English golfer
- David Howell (jurist) (1747–1824), American jurist
- David Howell (priest) (1831–1903), British clergyman
- David Howell (rugby league) (born 1983), Australian rugby league player
- Dean Howell (born 1980), English footballer
- Deborah Howell (1941–2010), American journalist
- Delles Howell (born 1948), American football player
- Denis Howell, Baron Howell (1923–1998), British Labour politician
- Dixie Howell (1912–1971), American football player
- Dixie Howell (catcher) (1920–1990), American baseball player
- Dixie Howell (pitcher) (1920–1960), American baseball player
- Dorothy Howell (composer) (1898–1982), British composer and pianist
- Dorothy Howell (screenwriter) (1899–1971), American screenwriter
- Dorothy Emma Howell (1919–2011), American homemaker and mother of Hillary Clinton
- Douglass Morse Howell (1906–1994), American papermaker and artist

=== E ===
- Edward Howell (disambiguation), several people
- Edwin C. Howell (1860–1907), American whist and chess player
- Edwin E. Howell (1845–1911), American geologist and cartographer
- Elias Howell (1792–1844), American politician
- Ella Mai Howell (born 1994), English singer-songwriter
- Evan Howell (1839–1905), American politician, early telegraph operator and officer in the Confederate Army

=== F ===
- Francis Howell (disambiguation), several people
- Francis Clark Howell (1925–2007), American anthropologist

=== G ===
- Gareth Howell (born 1981), Welsh racing driver
- Gary Howell (Michigan politician), member of the Michigan House of Representatives
- Gary Howell (West Virginia politician) (born 1966), member of the West Virginia House of Delegates
- Gene Howell, American bodybuilder
- George Howell (entrepreneur) (born 1945), American entrepreneur
- George Howell (Pennsylvania politician) (1859–1913), American Republican politician
- George Howell (soldier) (1893–1964), Australian soldier
- George Howell (trade unionist) (1833–1911), British politician and trade unionist
- George Evan Howell (1905–1980), American Republican politician
- George Howell Kidder (1925–2009), American lawyer
- Gerran Howell (born 1991), Welsh actor
- Gillian Howell (1927–2000), British architect
- Graham Howell (born 1951), English footballer
- Gwynne Howell (born 1938), Welsh opera singer

=== H ===
- Hannah Howell (born 1950), American romance novelist
- Harry Howell (baseball) (1876–1956), American baseball player
- Harry Howell (cricketer) (1890–1932), English cricketer and footballer
- Harry Howell (ice hockey) (1932–2019), Canadian ice hockey player
- Henry Howell (1920–1997), American Democratic politician
- Henry Howell (Mormon) (1828–1896), British-American settler
- Horatio Stockton Howell (1820–1963), American chaplain

=== I ===
- Ian Howell (born 1958), South African cricketer and umpire

=== J ===
- Jack Howell (baseball) (born 1961), American baseball player
- Jack Howell (footballer) (1924–1994), Australian rules football player
- Jack Howell (swimmer) (1899–1967), American swimmer
- Jack P. Howell (1895–1971), Australian rules football player
- James Howell (disambiguation), several people
- Jamie Howell (born 1977), English footballer
- Janet Howell (1944–2026), American Democratic politician
- Jay Howell (born 1955), American baseball player
- Jay Howell (illustrator) (born 1979), American illustrator, animator, cartoonist, and artist
- Jennifer Howell, Canadian-American voice actor
- Jenny Howell (died 1984), American murder victim
- Jeremiah B. Howell (1771–1822), U.S. Senator from Rhode Island
- Jim Lee Howell (1914–1995), American football player
- Joe Howell, American songwriter
- John Howell (defensive back) (born 1978), American football player
- John Howell (halfback) (1915–1946), American football player
- John Howell (politician) (born 1955), British Conservative politician
- John Adams Howell (1840–1918), American naval officer
- John Cummings Howell (1819–1892), American naval officer
- John H. Howell, American officer
- John McDade Howell (1922–2016), American professor
- John Thomas Howell (1903–1994), American botanist
- John White Howell (1857–1937), American electrical engineer
- Jordan Charles Howell, British musician
- Joseph Howell (1857–1918), American Republican politician
- Joshua B. Howell (1806–1864), American officer
- J. P. Howell (born 1983), American baseball player

=== K ===
- Kathleen Howell, American engineer
- Ken Howell (1960–2018), American baseball player
- Krista Howell, Canadian politician
- Kirby Howell-Baptiste, British Born American Actress

=== L ===
- Lane Howell (born 1941), American football player
- Larry Howell, American mechanical engineer
- Laura Howell, British comic book artist
- Lenzie Howell (1967–2020), American basketball player
- Leonard Howell (1898–1981), Jamaican religious figure, founder of the Rastafari movement
- Leonard Howell (footballer) (1848–1895), English footballer
- Lis Howell (born 1951), British journalist
- Llorne Howell (born 1972), New Zealand cricketer
- Lottice Howell (1897–1982), American singer and actress
- Luke Howell (born 1994), Australian film actor

=== M ===
- Magnolia Howell (born 1983), sprinter for Trinidad and Tobago
- Malcolm Clifford Howell (1895–1976), American pursuit pilot
- Margaret Howell (born 1946), British fashion designer
- Margaret Kempe Howell (1806–1867), American heiress, slave owner, and planter
- Mark Howell (born 1952), American musician
- Markus Howell (born 1975), Canadian football player
- Mary Howell (1932–1998), American physician and psychologist
- Matilda Howell (1859–1938), American archer
- Max Howell (footballer) (1921–2012), Australian rules footballer
- Max Howell (educator) (1927–2014), Australian educator and rugby union player
- Miguelina Howell, Dominican Republic-born bishop
- Mike Howell (1943–2016), American football player
- Miles Kristian Howell, British musician
- Mont Howell (1866–1944), American businessman
- Morton B. Howell (1834–1909), American politician
- Myfanwy Howell (1903–1988), Welsh broadcaster

=== N ===
- Nathaniel W. Howell (1770–1851), American Federalist politician
- Neville Howell, Australian rower
- Nick Howell (football coach) (born 1986), American football player
- Nick Howell (real tennis) (born 1986), Australian real tennis player

=== P ===
- Pat Howell (born 1957), American football player
- Pat Howell (baseball) (born 1968), American baseball player
- Paul Howell (disambiguation)
- Peg Leg Howell (1888–1966), American blues singer and guitarist
- Peter Howell (actor) (1919–2015), British actor
- Peter Howell (historian) (born 1941), British historian
- Peter Howell (musician) (born c. 1948), British musician and composer

=== R ===
- Rab Howell (1869–1937), British footballer
- Ralph Howell (1923–2008), British Conservative politician
- Red Howell (1909–1950), American baseball player
- Rhoda Pitchlynn Howell (1814–1911), Choctaw rancher and community leader
- Richard Howell (1754–1802), American politician; governor of New Jersey from 1794 to 1802
- Richard Howell (basketball) (born 1990), American-Israeli basketball player
- Richard Howell (comics), American comic book creator
- Richard Howell (cricketer) (born 1982), English cricketer
- Richard Howell (swimmer) (1903–1967), American swimmer
- Rob Howell, British costume and set designer
- Robert B. Howell (1864–1933), American Republican politician
- Rod Howell (born 1975), American dancer
- Roger Howell Jr. (1936–1989), American professor
- Roland Howell (1892–1973), American baseball player
- Ron Howell (Australian footballer) (1919–2015), Australian rules footballer
- Ron Howell (Canadian sportsman) (1935–1992), Canadian football and ice hockey player
- Ron Howell (footballer, born 1949), English footballer
- Rosemary Jessamyn Howell, Australian lawyer and academic
- Roy Howell (born 1953), American baseball player
- Rufus K. Howell (1820–1890), Justice of the Louisiana Supreme Court
- Russ Howell, American skateboarder

=== S ===
- Sam Howell (born 2000), American football player
- Scott Howell (disambiguation), multiple people
- Summer Howell (born 2004), Canadian actress

=== T ===
- Taylor Morgan Howell, British musician
- Thomas Howell (bishop) (1588–1650), British clergyman
- Thomas Howell (poet) (fl. 1568), English poet
- Thomas Bayly Howell (1767–1815), English lawyer and writer who lent his name to Howell's State Trials
- Thomas J. Howell (botanist) (1842–1912), American botanist
- Tommy Howell, British rugby league footballer who played in the 1890s and 1900s

=== V ===
- Valma Howell (1896–1979), Australian artist
- Varina Howell (1826–1906), First Lady of the Confederate States of America; wife of CSA President Jefferson Davis
- Verdun Howell (born 1937), Australian rules footballer
- David Koresh (born Vernon Howell) (1959–1993), American leader of Branch Davidians religious sect

=== W ===
- Walter Howell (born 1929), Australian rower
- Wayne Howell (1921–1993), American voice-over announcer
- William Howell (rugby player) (1863–unknown), Welsh rugby union player
- William Henry Howell (1860–1945), American physiologist
- William J. Howell (born 1943), American Republican politician
- William R. Howell, American businessman
- William Thompson Howell (1810–1870), American jurist and politician
- W. Nathaniel Howell (1939–2020), U.S. Ambassador to Kuwait, 1987–1991

=== Y ===
- Yvonne Howell (1905–2010), American actress

== Given name ==
- Howell Appling Jr. (1919–2002), American businessman and Republican politician
- Howell Binkley, American lighting designer
- Howell Cheney (1870–1957), American businessman
- Howell Cobb (1815–1868), American political figure
- Howell Cobb (born 1772) (1772–1818), American politician
- Howell Cobb (judge) (1922–2005), American judge
- Howell Davies (politician) (1851–1932), British Liberal politician
- Howell Davies (rugby, born 1885), Welsh rugby player
- Howell Davis (c. 1690–1719), British pirate
- Howell de Francis, Welsh rugby league player
- Howell M. Estes II (1914–2007), American general
- Howell M. Estes III (born 1941), American general
- Howell M. Forgy, USN chaplain
- Howell Glynne (1906–1969), British opera singer
- Howell Arthur Gwynne (1865–1950), British newspaper editor
- Howell Hansel (1860–1917), American film director
- Howell Harris (academic), British history professor
- Howell Heflin (1921–2005), American Democratic politician
- Howell Hollis, American golf coach
- Howell Edmunds Jackson (1832–1895), American jurist and politician
- Howell Jones (1882–1908), Welsh rugby union player
- Howell Lewis (1888–1971), Welsh rugby union player
- Howell Elvet Lewis (1860–1953), Welsh poet and hymn-writer
- Howell W. Melton (1923–2015), American judge
- Howell W. Melton Jr. (born 1951), American lawyer
- Howell Oakdeane Morrison (1888–1984), American musician
- Howell Peacock (1889–1962), American basketball coach
- Howell Peregrine (1938–2007), British mathematician
- Howell Raines (born 1943), American journalist, former Executive Editor of the New York Times
- Howell Shillingford, politician
- Howell Tatum (died 1822), Justice of the Tennessee Supreme Court
- Howell Tong (born 1944), Hong Kong statistician
- Howell Arthur John Witt (1920–1998), Australian clergyman

== Fictional characters ==
- Brutus "Brutal" Howell, prison guard played by David Morse in The Green Mile
- Claire Howell, prison guard played by Kristin Rohde on TV's Oz
- Thurston Howell III, millionaire played by Jim Backus on TV's Gilligan's Island
- Lovey Howell, wife of Thurston, played by Natalie Schafer on Gilligan's Island
- Elliot Howell III, fictional Hindenburg passenger credited to Colby Chester in the eponymous film
- Howell Jenkins, real (given by his parents) name of Wizard Howl in the fantasy trilogy Howl's Moving Castle
- Carl Howell, in the TV series Glee, played by John Stamos

== See also ==
- Admiral Howell (disambiguation)
- General Howell (disambiguation)
- Judge Howell (disambiguation)
- Justice Howell (disambiguation)
- Senator Howell (disambiguation)
- Powell (surname) (Welsh: ap Hywell, lit. 'son of Howell')
- Howells (disambiguation)
- Howel, disambiguation
- Welsh surnames
