= Howell =

Howell may refer to:

== Places ==
=== In the United States ===
- Howell, Georgia, an unincorporated community
- Howell, Evansville, a neighborhood in Indiana
- Howell, Michigan, a city in Livingston County
- Howell County, Missouri
- Howell, Missouri, an unincorporated community
- Howell, Utah, a town
- Howell Mountains, California
- Howell Island, Missouri - see Howell Island Conservation Area
- Howell Township (disambiguation), several places

=== Elsewhere ===
- Howell, Lincolnshire, England, a hamlet
  - Asgarby and Howell, a civil parish in Lincolnshire
- Howell, New South Wales, Australia, a locality and ghost town
- Mount Howell, Ellsworth Land, Antarctica
- Howell Peak, Oates Land, Antarctica

== Businesses ==
- Howell, Soskin, a defunct American publisher acquired by Crown Books
- John Howell & Son, British building and engineering company
- Howell Works, a 19th century pig iron producing facility in New Jersey, United States

== Other uses ==
- Howell (name), a surname and given name, including lists of people and fictional characters
- Howell automatic rifle, a semi-automatic conversion of the Lee–Enfield rifle
- Howell torpedo, an early type of U.S. Navy torpedo
- 88P/Howell, a periodic comet
- Howell High School (disambiguation)
- Howell Trophy, an annual award recognizing the best men's college basketball player in the state of Mississippi
- Howell, a table movement system used in duplicate bridge (see Duplicate bridge#Table movements)
- Hugh Howell Road, Georgia

== See also ==
- Howell House (disambiguation), various houses on the US National Register of Historic Places
- Howell Mountain, California, an unincorporated community
  - Howell Mountain AVA, an American Viticultural Area in Napa County, California
- Howell Shrublands, an endangered ecological community in northern New South Wales, Australia
- Howells (disambiguation)
- Howel, disambiguation page
