= General Estes =

General Estes may refer to:

- George Henson Estes (1873–1969), U.S. Army brigadier general
- Howell M. Estes II (1914–2007), U.S. Air Force general
- Howell M. Estes III (born 1941), U.S. Air Force general
