= George Howell =

George Howell may refer to:

- George Evan Howell (1905–1980), U.S. Representative from Illinois
- George Howell (cricketer) (1822–1890), Australian cricketer
- George Howell (entrepreneur) (born 1945), founder of The Coffee Connection
- George Howell (journalist), CNN news anchor
- George Howell (Pennsylvania politician) (1859–1913), U.S. Representative from Pennsylvania
- George Howell (trade unionist) (1833–1910), British trade unionist and reform campaigner
- George Howell (soldier) (1893–1964), Australian Victoria Cross recipient
- George Howell Kidder (1925–2009), American lawyer
- George Rogers Howell (1833–1899), American historian, genealogist, and science fiction writer
