= Howell Estes =

Howell Estes may refer to:

- Howell M. Estes II (1914–2007), U.S. Air Force general
- Howell M. Estes III (born 1941), his son, U.S. Air Force general
