= Ron Howell =

Ron Howell may refer to:

- Ron Howell (Canadian sportsman) (1935–1992), Canadian football and ice hockey player
- Ron Howell (footballer, born 1949), English footballer
- Ron Howell (Australian footballer) (1919–2015), Australian rules footballer

== See also ==
- Ron Howells (1927–2011), Welsh footballer
