= Patronymic surname =

Surname based on the father's given name

A patronymic surname is a surname originated from the given name of the father or a patrilineal ancestor. Different cultures have different ways of producing patronymic surnames.

== Definition and evolution ==
Patronymic surnames originate from the given name of either an individual's father or a patrilineal ancestor. In the Old Testament of the Bible, men are identified by their lineage through use of their father's first (and only) name.

Last names were ‘normalized’ and became more standardized with the advent of mass literacy, paper availability and documentation, and mobility. For example, passports vs early letters of introduction for travel.

== Examples in various cultures ==
=== Wales ===
For example, early patronymic Welsh surnames were the result of the Anglicizing of the historical Welsh naming system, which sometimes had included references to several generations: e.g., Llywelyn ap Gruffydd ap Morgan (Llywelyn son of Gruffydd son of Morgan), and which gave rise to the quip, "as long as a Welshman's pedigree".

As an example of Anglicization, the name Llywelyn ap Gruffydd was turned into Llywelyn Gruffydds or Griffiths, i.e., the "ap" meaning "son of" was replaced by the genitive suffix "-s". Some Welsh surnames, such as John (a biblical name) or Howell (Hywel), did not acquire the suffix "-s". In some other cases, the suffix was affixed to the surname much later, in the 18th or 19th century. Likewise, in some cases, the "ap" coalesced into the name in some form, as in Bevan (ab Evan), Broderick (ab Rhydderch), Price (ap Rhys), Powell (ap Hywel; Hywel itself was anglicized to Howell), and Upjohn (ap John).

=== Russian ===
Last names or surnames were not set in Russia, but patronymic and based on a father's first name: Peter's children might be Jan and Roman Petrovich; Peter's grand children could be Aleksandr Janowicz and Ivan Romanowicz/Romanovich. Peter's great grandchildren could be Nicolai Aleksandrovich and Dmitri Ivanovich.

=== Iceland and Scandinavia ===
Nearly all Icelandic names are strictly patronymic, or in some cases matronymic, as Icelandic society generally does not make use of hereditary family names. A similar situation could, until relatively recently, be found in the continental Scandinavian countries of Denmark, Norway, and Sweden, where hereditary family names came into widespread use for the general population during the course of the 19th century or the beginning of the 20th century, ultimately as a consequence of legislation. As the outcome of this, a large majority of Scandinavian family names originated as the patronymics borne by the heads of family at the times when these laws came into effect, and these surnames mostly display a limited variety reflecting the popularity of male given names during the 18th and 19th centuries in those countries.

=== Mauritania ===
Most Mauritanian surnames are also patronymic, with names consisting of "Ould" or "Mint" followed by the ancestor's name or names.

=== Turkey ===
In Turkey, under the Surname Law, all patronymic surnames from other languages had to be changed to the Turkish patronymic -oğlu.

== See also ==
- List of family name affixes
- Matrilineality
- Matriname
- Matronymic
- Patrilineality
- Toponymic surname
