= Helliwell =

Helliwell is a surname. Notable people with the surname include:

- David Helliwell (born 1935), Canadian rower
- Ian Helliwell (born 1962), English footballer
- John Helliwell (born 1945), English musician: saxophonist, keyboardist and woodwind player for the rock band Supertramp
- John F. Helliwell (born 1937), Canadian economist
- John R. Helliwell (born 1953), British chrystallographer
- Luke Helliwell (born 1988), English rugby player
- Robert Helliwell (1920–2011), electrical engineer and professor at Stanford University
- Sid Helliwell (1904–1939), footballer
- Wade Helliwell (born 1978), Australian basketball player

== See also ==
- Helliwells Ltd, a British engineering firm
- Gordon & Helliwell, turn of the 20th century architectural firm based in Toronto, Ontario
- Helliwell Hills or Usarp Mountains, major Antarctic mountain range, west of the Rennick Glacier
- Helliwell Provincial Park, provincial park in British Columbia, Canada
- Halliwell (disambiguation)
- Halwell
- Hellewell
- Holwell (disambiguation)
