= Charles Howell =

Charles Howell may refer to:

- Charles Howell (British politician) (1905–1974), British Labour Party politician
- Charles Augustus Howell (1840–1890), art dealer and alleged blackmailer
- Charles Henry Howell (1824–1905), architect of lunatic asylums in England
- Charles R. Howell (1904–1973), American Democratic Party politician
- Charles Howell III (born 1979), American golfer
- Charles Andrew Howell III (born 1930), American businessman and politician
- Charles Gough Howell (1894–1942), Welsh lawyer and British colonial official
- Charlie Howell (1874–1934), Australian rules footballer
