= Hywel =

Hywel (Welsh pronunciation: [ˈhəuɛl]), sometimes anglicised as Howel or Howell, is a Welsh masculine given name meaning "eminent" or "conspicuous." It may refer to:

== Monarchs ==
- Hywel the Great, late fifth- and early sixth-century noble in Brittany, saint and king of Brittany in the Arthurian legend.
- Hywel ap Rhodri Molwynog, 9th-century king of Gwynedd
- Hywel Dda or Hywel the Good (died 950), king of Deheubarth and much of the rest of Wales, famed as a lawgiver
- Huwal of the West Welsh, 10th-century Welsh king, possibly identical to Hywel Dda

== Other people ==
- Hywel ab Owain Gwynedd (died 1170), Welsh poet and military leader
- Syr Hywel y Fwyall or Sir Hywel ap Gruffudd (fl. 1356–died 1381), Welsh knight
- Hywel Bennett (1944–2017), Welsh actor
- Hywel David Evans (1924–2019), Australian politician
- Hywel Evans (figure skater) (born 1945), Welsh figure skater
- Hywel Francis (1946–2021), Welsh historian and politician; MP for Aberavon
- Hywel Griffith, BBC Wales news correspondent
- Hywel Gwynfryn (1942–), Welsh actor and radio personality
- Hywel Harris (1714–1773), Welsh Methodist preacher
- Hywel Williams (born 1953), Welsh politician; MP for Arfon
- Dyddgu Hywel (born 1989), Welsh rugby union player

== See also ==
- Hoel (disambiguation), the Breton form of this name
- Howel
- Howell (disambiguation)
- Powel
- Powell (surname), anglicised from Welsh ap Hywel (son of Hywel)
