= Howells (surname) =

Howells is a Welsh surname. Notable people with the surname include:

- Adele C. Howells (1886–1951), president of the Mormon children's organization
- Anne Howells (1941–2022), British operatic mezzo-soprano
- Callum Scott Howells (born 1999), Welsh actor
- Danny Howells (born 1970), English record producer and disc jockey
- David Howells (born 1967), English footballer
- Drew Howells, American politician
- Glenn Howells (born 1961), British architect
- Herbert Howells (1892–1983), English composer
- John Mead Howells (1868–1959), American architect
- Kim Howells (born 1946), Welsh Labour politician and member of Parliament
- Philip Arthur Howells (1855–1921), musical entrepreneur in South Australia
- Roger Howells, Welsh footballer
- Rosalind Howells, Baroness Howells of St Davids (1931–2025), English Labour politician
- Sarah Howells, British singer-songwriter and trance vocalist
- Ursula Howells (1922–2005), English actress
- William Dean Howells (1837–1920), American realist author and literary critic
- William W. Howells (1908–2005), professor of anthropology at Harvard

== See also ==
- Howell (name)
- Howes (surname)
- Holwell (surname)
- Howes
