= Howle =

Howle is a surname. Notable people with this name include:

- Billy Howle (born 1989), British actor
- Peter Howle, British architect
- C. Tycho Howle, American businessman, founder of Harbinger Corp.
- Danielle Howle, American singer-songwriter
- Emmet Howle, American college football player for 2015 The Citadel Bulldogs football team
- Jeff Howle, American educator, principal of Academy of Technology, Engineering, Mathematics, and Science in Abilene, Texas
- John Howle, American college football player, starred in 1954 Sun Bowl
- Leslie Howle, American writing workshop administrator, two-time nominee for World Fantasy Special Award—Non-professional
- Lt. P. W. Howle Jr., American naval officer, commanded USS Improve (AM-247)
- Ryan Howle, British game show contestant on Britain's Best Brain
- Ty Howle, American college football player for 2013 Penn State Nittany Lions football team
- Victoria Howle, American mathematician
- Walker Howle, American rock musician for Dead Confederate

== See also ==
- Carmen Howle, fictional character in list of Tracy Beaker Returns characters
- Howell (name)
- Howl (disambiguation)
