= Dark Stares =

British alternative rock band

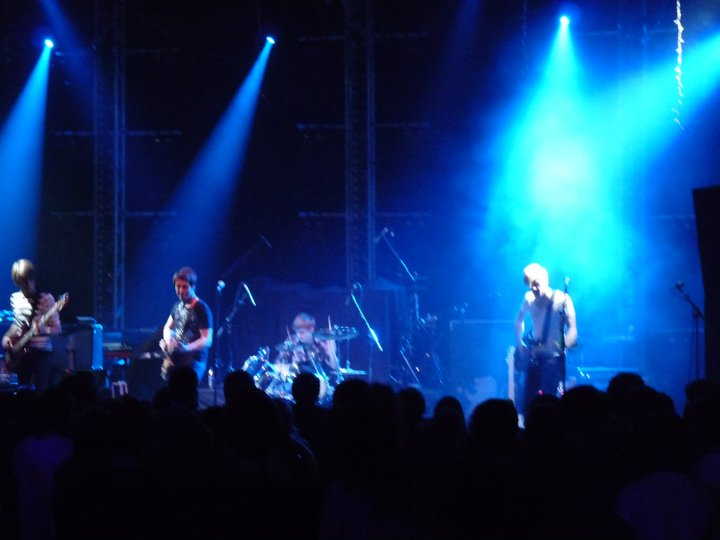

Background information
- Origin: St Albans, Hertfordshire, United Kingdom
- Genres: Alternative rock, indie rock
- Years active: 2009–present
- Label: AWAL UK
- Members: Miles Kristian Howell; Taylor Howell; Harry Collins; Brett Harland Howell
- Website: darkstares.com

Dark Stares are a British alternative rock band from St Albans, Hertfordshire. Formed in 2009, the band is composed of brothers Miles Kristian Howell (lead vocals, rhythm guitar), Taylor Howell (drums, guitars, backing vocals), Brett Harland Howell (bass guitar, backing vocals) and Harry Collins (lead guitar, backing vocals).

The band have produced three studio EPs: Tell Your Friends (2012), Octopon (2013) and Soul Contract (2014), all recorded at Outhouse Studios in Reading, Berkshire and released with AWAL, one live EP titled Zebra Session (2015) and a debut studio album in 2018: Darker Days Are Here to Stay.

== History ==
=== Beginnings ===
The band began rehearsing in their shed in late 2009, under the name Kalazar. With the two youngest members of the band only 16, they played their first gig in December 2009, supporting XFM Manchester Unsigned 2007 winners, The Scratch. Eventually the band settled on the name Dark Stares, inspired by the theme tune of Welsh children's television series Funnybones. The brothers have "proud Welsh roots" on their father's side, as well as a Welsh surname.

Dark Stares is also a reference to the George R.R. Martin series of epic fantasy novels, A Song of Ice and Fire. They continued to perform extensively at small venues mainly in local counties and London, but also nationally, including shows with The Subways, Bleech, Touchstone, Canterbury, Fun Lovin' Criminals, Goldblade, What Now, Bo Ningen, The Static Jacks and Willy Moon.

As they became more locally established, they were invited by fellow St Albans band Enter Shikari to open for them at The Forum, University of Hertfordshire in December 2010. The sold-out show featured performances from Rolo Tomassi and Young Guns, as well as Don Broco and The Qemists.

=== Tell Your Friends (2010–12) ===
Their debut EP, titled Tell Your Friends, was recorded at Outhouse Studios, in Reading with Ben Humphreys and It Bites frontman, John Mitchell. Opening track "Whisky" received repeated airplay on XFM from Ian Camfield's Rock Show. AbsolutePunk interviewed the band on the release, who cited Nirvana and Black Rebel Motorcycle Club as influences. In October 2011 they were invited to perform as sole support to The Darkness for their "comeback" show at the prestigious 100 Club on Oxford Street, London. The gig sold-out quickly and was heavily attended by music journalists, as well as notable appearances from Queen guitarist Brian May and comedian Rufus Hound. In November 2011 the band were interviewed on BBC Introducing to discuss the debut release, and Powerplay Magazine reviewed the EP, declaring Dark Stares "to be on the radio soon – and getting the recognition they deserve." Black Velvet featured the band as "Supersonic Future Superstars" and labelled the EP "rock n' roll fantasy full of sonic supremacy."

=== Octopon and "Bad Machine" (2012–14) ===
In October 2012, the band released a music video for "Bad Machine" ahead of their second EP Octopon. The video quickly rose to over 100,000 views on YouTube. Hit the Floor speculated the EP name came from cult animated series The Pirates of Dark Water and had "the sleazy glamour of Audioslave, in their 'Cochise' days." The release was picked up on by national magazine Metal Hammer, which controversially quipped that the record was an imitation of the style of Queens of the Stone Age, claiming "they may have QOTSA's debt-collectors knocking on their door soon." Rock Sound magazine reviewed the release favourably, also drawing comparisons to Queens of the Stone Age and Foo Fighters respectively, and stated "we're more inclined to throw Muse into the equation." Powerplay Magazine followed-up their previous feature positively, stating "randomly dropping into any track would elicit a hypnotic pounding groove." In August 2013 the band officially launched the EP with a headline show at the Barfly in Camden, London.

=== Soul Contract and Zebra Session (2014–2017) ===
On 28 October 2014, the band announced their third EP Soul Contract, releasing a teaser video on YouTube featuring five new songs. On 24 November 2014 the EP was made digitally available worldwide, with a physical release scheduled for 6 April 2015. In January 2015 MAMA announced a Dark Stares headline show on 2 May 2015 at the Camden Barfly to officially launch the EP, with support from Alexis Kings and Franklin. In the same month they released Zebra Session, a live EP featuring four live versions of tracks from their previous studio releases with accompanying music videos.

=== Debut album: Darker Days Are Here to Stay (2018–present) ===
On 5 March 2018 the band announced their debut album with a pre-order available for physical release, including 100 signed copies. On 11 May 2018, the album was released worldwide. Classic Rock featured the album with a mixed review, labelling some songs as both "propulsive" and "electrifying".

== Band members ==
Current members

- Miles Kristian Howell – lead vocals, guitar (2009–present)
- Taylor Howell – drums, percussion, guitar, backing vocals (2009–present)
- Harry Collins – lead guitar, backing vocals (2009–present)
- Brett Harland Howell – bass guitar, backing vocals (2009–present)

== Discography ==
=== Extended plays ===
Title	Album details
Tell Your Friends	Released: 12 May 2012; Labels: AWAL; Formats: CD, digital download
Octopon	Released: 1 July 2013; Labels: AWAL; Formats: CD, digital download
Soul Contract	Released: 24 November 2014; Labels: AWAL; Formats: CD, Digital download
Zebra Session (Live)	Released: 12 January 2015; Labels: AWAL; Formats: CD, Digital download
Ruby - EP	Released: 18 December 2020; Labels: AWAL; Formats: Digital download
Obsidian - EP	Released: 3 September 2021; Labels: AWAL; Formats: Digital download
Emerald - EP	Released: 3 December 2021; Labels: AWAL; Formats: Digital download

=== Studio albums ===
Title	Album details
Darker Days Are Here to Stay	Released: 4 May 2018; Labels: AWAL; Formats: CD, digital download
The Lightning Echo	Released: 31 May 2019; Labels: AWAL; Formats: CD, digital download

== See also ==
- List of bands from England
- List of indie-rock musicians
