= James Howell (disambiguation) =

James Howell (c. 1594–1666) was an Anglo-Welsh historian and writer.

James Howell may also refer to:

- James Howell (chess player) (born 1967), English chess grandmaster and author
- James Howell (politician) (1829–1897), mayor of Brooklyn, New York
- James B. Howell (1816–1880), American lawyer, newspaper editor, and politician
- James F. Howell (1934–2026), American politician in the state of Oklahoma
- James Howell, founder of Cardiff's Howells (department store) in 1856
- James Howell, early leader of Britain's National Association of Discharged Sailors and Soldiers
- J. P. Howell (James Phillip Howell, born 1983), American baseball pitcher
- Jamie Howell (born 1977), English footballer
- Jim Howell, Ambassador of New Zealand to Saudi Arabia, 2003–2007
- Jim Howell (Kansas politician), American politician and former member of the Kansas House of Representatives
- Jim Howell (Michigan politician) (born 1949), former member of the Michigan House of Representatives
- Jim Lee Howell (1914–1995), American football player and coach
