= Bognor Regis Town F.C. =

Association football club in England

Coordinates: 50°47′13″N 0°41′25″W

Bognor Regis Town
- Nickname: The Rocks
- Founded: 1883; 143 years ago (as Bognor F.C.)
- Ground: Nyewood Lane, Bognor Regis
- Capacity: 4,500 (367 seated)
- Chairman: Dominic Reynolds
- Manager: Danny Hollands
- League: Isthmian League South Central Division
- 2025–26: Isthmian League South Central Division, 11th of 22
- Website: bognorregistownfc.co.uk
Home colours	Away colours

Bognor Regis Town Football Club is an English football club based in Bognor Regis, West Sussex. Nicknamed 'The Rocks’, the club is an FA Chartered Standard Community club affiliated to the Sussex County Football Association. They currently compete in the Isthmian League South Central Division, after being relegated from the Premier Division in the 2024–25 season.

== History ==
Bognor Regis Town F.C. was founded in 1883 and the club became founding members of the West Sussex Football League in 1896, joining the Senior Division. They won the championship of this league for five successive years in the early 1920s, after which they joined the Brighton, Hove & District Football League in 1926. Just one year later, however, they joined the Sussex County League where they were to remain until 1972. The club became Bognor Regis F.C. in 1929 after King George V added the suffix 'Regis' to the seaside resort.

The club won the Sussex County Division One championship in the 1948–49 season. At the end of that season, they added "Town" to their name so as not to be confused with the local rugby club.

At the end of the 1969–70 season they were relegated, but won Division Two at the first attempt. The club won the Division One championship title the following season and were promoted to Division One South of the Southern League. In 1972–73 they reached the first round of the FA Cup for the first time, losing 6–0 at Colchester United. In 1976 Jack Pearce became manager at the age of just 26, and went on to hold the position until 2007.

In 1981 the club were transferred to Division One of the Isthmian League, and were promoted at the end of the 1981–82 season after finishing second. In 1984–85 they reached the first round of the FA Cup again, defeating Swansea City 3–1 in a replay after a 1–1 draw at the Vetch Field. In the second round they lost 6–2 at Reading. They reached the second round again the following season, beating Enfield in the first round, before losing 6–1 at Gillingham. They reached the first round again in 1986–87 (losing 1–0 in a replay to Slough Town) and 1987–88 (losing 3–0 at home to Torquay United). In 1988–89 they beat Football League opposition again, defeating Exeter City 2–1, before losing to Cambridge United.

In 1991–92 Bognor finished in the relegation zone, but were reprieved after Dagenham and Redbridge Forest merged. However, the following season they finished bottom of the Premier Division, and were relegated to Division One. In 1995–96 they reached the second round of the FA Cup for a fourth time, before losing 4–0 at Peterborough United.

In 2002–03 they finished second in Division One South, and were promoted back to the Premier Division. After finishing tenth the following year, the club were placed in the newly established Conference South. They were relegated back to the Isthmian League Premier Division at the end of the 2008–09 season, and were relegated again the following season.

Season 2010–11 saw the club compete in the Isthmian League Division One South and they missed out on promotion back to the Premier Division by the tightest of margins. Having finished with a club record total of 96 points, they lost out in the title race to Metropolitan Police on goal difference by just one goal, having led the table by two points, going in to the last fixture. As a result, they found themselves having to participate in the end-of-season play-offs, where they lost at home to Dulwich Hamlet who had finished 31 points behind.

In 2011–12 they again finished second in Division One South. They won the end-of-season play-offs, defeating Godalming Town in a thrilling semi-final, before beating Dulwich Hamlet 1–0 in the final, and thus gaining promotion to the Premier Division. The 2013–14 season started slowly, with just one point from the opening four matches. However they soon rose up the table, eventually finishing in third place and qualified for the end of season play-offs, although this ended in defeat in the semi-final at home to Lowestoft Town.

The 2015–16 season saw the club miss out on the Premier Division title by one point and then lose in the play-offs to Dulwich Hamlet. They did, however, also enjoy their best ever run in the FA Trophy by reaching the semi-finals. They beat a number of teams from higher divisions along the way, including Bath City, Maidstone United, Altrincham, Sutton United and Torquay United. But hopes of an appearance at Wembley Stadium were dashed when they were defeated in the semi-final by Grimsby Town, losing 1–0 in the first leg at Nyewood Lane, before also losing the second leg 2–1 at Blundell Park (3–1 on aggregate).

Season 2016–17 saw the club finish in second place for the second season running, but this time they triumphed in the play-offs, defeating Wingate & Finchley F.C. in the semi-final, before victory over Dulwich Hamlet in the final, to win promotion to the National League South for season 2017–18. However, despite a promising start to life in the Vanarama National League South in 2017–18, they eventually finished bottom of the table and, as a result, returned to the Isthmian Premier for the 2018–19 season.

The club spent much of the 2018–19 season in play-off contention but a dip in form in the last couple of months saw them eventually finish in 14th place. However, they won the Sussex Senior Cup for the first time in 32 years, defeating Burgess Hill Town 2–1 after extra time in the final played at Falmer Stadium, Brighton.

== Stadium ==
The club play at Nyewood Lane. The ground has a capacity of 4,500, most of which has covered accommodation. The clubhouse end of the ground saw the addition of an unusual 'beach brolly' style terrace cover in 2018, although this was severely damaged and as a result, pulled down due to Storm Ciara in 2020. The summer of 2020 saw the construction of a new 367 seated stand, with the roof at the clubhouse end replaced in October 2020. The ground's first set of floodlights was bought from Wembley Stadium and fitted onto telegraph poles. In the 1970s the current floodlight pylons were added, with four along each touchline, before two of these were removed on each side in the early 1990s.

On 15 August 2008 a fire destroyed the clubhouse, and was suspected to be arson. Work on a new social club, named 'Seasons', commenced during the summer of 2009 and opened in November the same year.

A new 3G playing surface was installed in the latter part of 2025, along with upgrades to the floodlights and dressing rooms. Home matches were played at nearby Chichester City until the work was completed in December 2025.

== Current squad ==
Note: Flags indicate national team as defined under FIFA eligibility rules; some limited exceptions apply. Players may hold more than one non-FIFA nationality.

No.	Pos.	Nation	Player
—	GK	ENG	Dan Lincoln
—	DF	ENG	Joe Alman
—	DF	ENG	Matt Jones
—	DF	ENG	Chad Field
—	DF	ENG	Henry Searle
—	DF	ENG	Craig Robson
—	DF	ENG	Ethan Robb
—	DF	ENG	Beau Mullins
—	DF	ENG	Finlay Walsh-Smith
—	MF	ENG	Kaya Tshaka
—	MF	ENG	Harvey Whyte

No.	Pos.	Nation	Player
—	MF	KOR	Lee Suk-Jae
—	MF	ENG	Billy Allcock
—	MF	ENG	Toby Kingswell
—	MF	ENG	Preston Woolston
—	MF	ENG	Tommy Block
—	FW	ROU	Laurentiu Sendrea
—	FW	ENG	Lennie Smith
—	FW	ENG	Dan Gifford
—	FW	ENG	Callum Laycock
—	FW	ENG	Callum Barlow

== Club officials ==
As of 20 January 2024

=== General Management ===
Position	Name
Chairman	Dominic Reynolds
Vice Chairman	Jack Pearce
Commercial Director	Russ Chandler
Match Secretary	Peter Helsby
Women Secretary	Lucy Jane Martin
Head Groundsman	James Askew

=== Men's First Team ===
Position	Name
Manager
Manager	Danny Hollands
Assistant Manager	Ben Kneller
Strength & Conditioning Coach	David Birmingham
Goalkeeping Coach	Wes Hallett
Physiotherapist	Hannah Meaden

=== Women's First Team ===
Position	Name
Manager	Craig Seacombe
Assistant Manager	

All positions are published on the club website.

== Managers ==
As of 25 May 26. Statistics below are League matches only (Sussex County/Southern/Isthmian/Conference South).

Name	Nationality	Period	G	W	D	L	Win %
Danny Hollands	(England)	February 2026 - Present	10	4	6	0	40%
Jamie Howell	(England)	April 2025 - February 2026	27	11	2	14	40%
Michael Birmingham & Jamie Howell (joint)	(England)	December 2024 – April 2025	21	5	5	11	23.8%
David Birmingham (interim)	(England)	November 2024 – December 2024	2	0	0	2	0%
Robbie Blake	(England)	March 2022 – November 2024	5	3	0	2	60%
Jack Pearce	(England)	May 2017–March 2022	—	—	—	—	—
Jamie Howell	(England)	June 2009–May 2017	124	64	33	27	51.61%
Mick Jenkins	(England)	June 2008 – January 2009	23	2	7	14	8.70%
Michael Birmingham	(England)	October 2007 – May 2008	30	9	10	11	30%
Jack Pearce	(England)	June 1994 – October 2007	566	227	144	195	40.10%
Mick Pullen	(England)	June 1992 – May 1994	84	20	24	40	23.81%
Jack Pearce	(England)	March 1976 – May 1992	672	254	163	255	37.78%
Derek Edwards	(England)	June 1970 – March 1976	208	86	50	72	41.35%

== Honours ==
=== League Honours ===
- West Sussex League Winners – 1920–21, 1921–22, 1922–23, 1923–24, 1924–25.
- West Sussex League Runners-Up – 1897–98.
- Sussex County League Div. 1 Winners – 1948–49, 1971–72.
- Sussex County League Div. 2 Winners – 1970/71.
- Southern League Southern Division Runners-Up – 1980–81.
- Isthmian Premier Division Runners-Up – 2015–16 (not promoted), 2016–17 (promoted).
- Isthmian Division One Runners-Up – 1981–82.
- Isthmian Division One South Runners-Up – 2002–03 (promoted), 2010–11 (not promoted), 2011–12 (promoted)

=== Cup Honours ===
- FA Trophy semi-finalists – 2015–16
- FA Cup second round proper – 4 times
- FA Cup first round proper – 3 times
- Sussex Senior Cup winners – 1954–55, 1955–56, 1979–80, 1980–81, 1981–82, 1982–83, 1983–84, 1986–87, 2018–19.
- The Sussex Royal Ulster Rifles Charity Cup
  - Winners (1): 1971–72
  - Runners-up (1): 1958–59,
- Isthmian League Cup winners – 1986–87

== Club records ==
- Record victory 24–0 v Littlehampton, West Sussex Senior League, 1913–14
- Record defeat 0–19 v Shoreham, West Sussex Senior League, 1906–07
- Record attendance 3,642 v Swansea City, FA Cup first round replay, 1984–85
- Appearances: Mick Pullen, 967, 1976–96
- Goalscorer: Kevin Clements, 216, 1978–89
- Best league performance: (Pre-2004) Second in Southern League Southern Division 1980–81

(Post-2004) Ninth in the Conference South, 2004–05

- Best FA Cup performances: Second round, 1984–85, 1985–86, 1988–89, 1995–96. First round, 1972–73, 1986–87, 1987–88.
- Best FA Trophy performance: Semi Final, 2015–16
- Most points in a season: 96 points in season 2010–2011, in the Isthmian Division One South

== Team colours ==
The club's home strip consists of green and white, of which in the past, combinations have varied including green and white striped shirts, green and white halved shirts, green and white quartered shirts and plain green shirts with white shorts. Following King George V's decision to add the suffix 'Regis' to the town's name in 1929, the club wore a blue and gold strip for a period in the 1930s, before reverting to green and white some time later that decade. Since the mid-1970s, the strip has mostly consisted of white shirts, green shorts and white socks, as is the case today. Away colours have varied over the years, although blue shirts (various shades) were worn from 1998 to 2016. From 2016 to 2023, the club wore a maroon and white strip for away fixtures. A new orange and black away strip was introduced for the 2023–24 season.

== Shirt sponsors and manufacturers ==
Season	Kit Manufacturer	Main Shirt Sponsor
1979–1980	Adidas	Hago Plastics
1980–1981	Umbro	Hago Plastics
1981–1983	Umbro	No Shirt Sponsor
1983–1985	Umbro	Hamilton Lines
1985–1987	New Olympic	West Sussex Contractors
1987–1989	Puma	Butlins (FA Cup ties only)
1989–1991	New Olympic	Adcocks Suzuki
1991–1992	New Olympic	Hall Signs
1992–1993	Bukta	Spindlers Lamps & Lights
1993–1994	Diadora	Reynolds Furniture Store
1994–1995	Diadora	Reynolds Furniture Store
1995–1996	ICIS	Reynolds Furniture Store
1996–1997	ICIS	Esprit Accountants
1997–1998	ICIS	Butlins Bognor Regis
1998–1999	Vandanel	Competitive Cleaning
1999–2000	Vandanel	Reynolds Furniture Store
2000–2001	Spall	Finest Windows
2001–2002	Spall	Express Printing
2002–2003	Spall	Wayne Windows
2003–2005	GX	Aldersmead
2005–2006	GX	homes2buy.co.uk
2006–2007	GX	KFC
2007–2008	GX	VRV Autos
2008–2009	GX	Apogee Corporation
2009–2010	Erreà	Apogee Corporation
2010–2011	Erreà	Keith Jay Carpets
2011–2012	Erreà	Chestnut Tree House
2012–2013	Erreà	Havant Motor Factors
2013–2014	Erreà	Viessmann
2014–2015	Erreà	FRH Machinery
2015–2016	Erreà	Gilbert & Cleveland
2016–2017	Erreà	Concise Surfacing Ltd
2017–2018	Erreà	Buildbase
2018-2019	Erreà	Woods Travel
2019-2020	Erreà	Reynolds Furniture Store
2020-2022	Erreà	Apuldram Centre
2022-2023	Erreà	Specsavers
2023-2024	Erreà	Barfoots
2024-2025	Erreà	Kevin Welling Plumbing & Heating
2025-2026	Erreà	K.Fellowes Roofing
2026-2027	Erreà	Coastline Kitchens & Bathrooms

== See also ==
Category:Bognor Regis Town F.C. players
