= Justice Howell =

Justice Howell may refer to:

- David Howell (jurist) (1747–1824), associate justice of the Rhode Island Supreme Court
- Edward H. Howell (1915–1994), associate justice of the Oregon Supreme Court
- Francis S. Howell (1863–1937), associate justice of the Nebraska Supreme Court
- Rufus K. Howell (1820–1890), associate justice of the Louisiana Supreme Court
- William Barberie Howell (1865–1927), associate justice and chief justice of the United States Customs Court

== See also ==
- Judge Howell (disambiguation)
