= Maximilian F. Bonzano =

German-born American physician (1821–1894)

Maximilian Ferdinand Bonzano
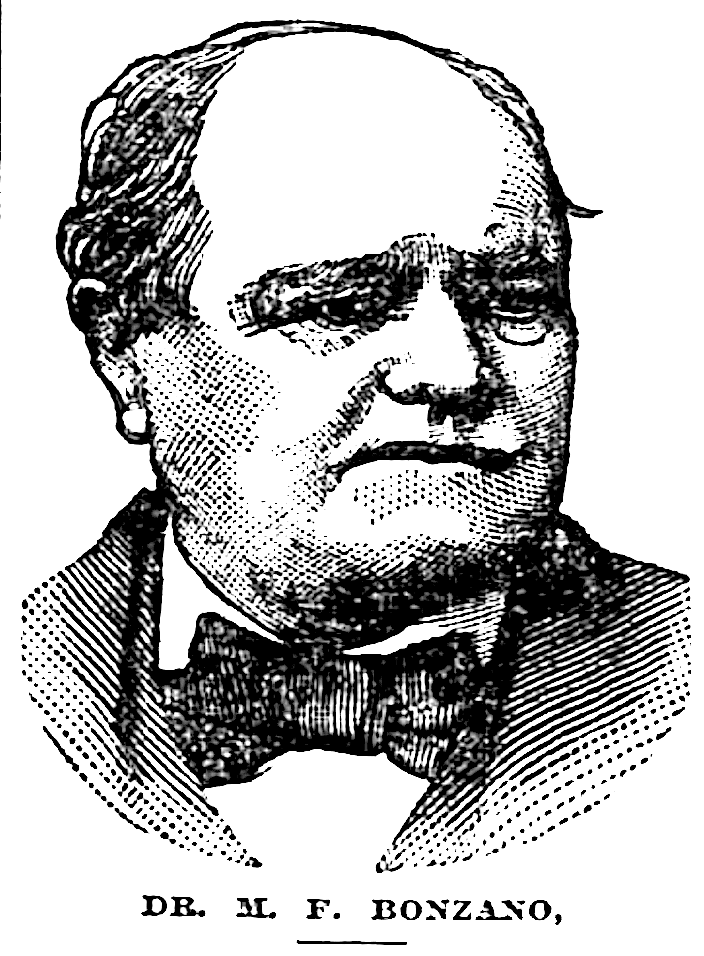
- Born: March 22, 1821; Ebingen, Kingdom of Württemberg (now Germany)
- Died: May 23, 1894 (aged 73); St. Bernard Parish, Louisiana, U.S.
- Other names: Maximillian Bonzano, Max Bonzano, M.F. Bonzano
- Occupations: Government official, politician, physician
- Political party: Republican party

Maximilian Ferdinand Bonzano (March 22, 1821—May 23, 1894), was a German-born American government official, politician, and physician in Louisiana. He chaired the committee on emancipation in Louisiana during the American Civil War. Bonzano was elected to the U.S. Congress representing the first district of New Orleans in 1864, but was not allowed to take his seat. He was morally opposed to slavery and was part of the Republican party. He also used the names Maximillian Bonzano, Max Bonzano, and M.F. Bonzano.

== Early life and family ==
Bonzano was born on March 22, 1821, in Ebingen, Kingdom of Württemberg (now in Baden-Württemberg, Germany). He completed some of his education in Germany. In 1835, he emigrated from Germany to the United States with some members of his family, eventually settling in New Orleans, Louisiana after briefly living in Texas.

He was the younger brother of Hubert Bonzano (1826–1891), a public official and co-owner alongside John Armstrong of Oak Alley Plantation in St. James Parish, Louisiana (which was a sugar and pecan plantation). Both Hubert and Maximilian were described as having Union Army sympathies. Another brother was Adolphus Bonzano (1830–1913), a civil engineer with the Phoenixville Bridge Works in Philadelphia.

== Career ==
His first occupation in New Orleans was as a "roller boy" at a printshop called William McKean and Co., and through this experience he helped publish the first issue of The Picayune newspaper in 1835, working alongside journalists Francis Asbury Lumsden and George Wilkins Kendall. He learned the English language while working at the printshop. He left his printshop role in order to apprentice at a pharmacy under Curlius Riddel, where he studied chemistry and pharmacy. In 1843, he became a student resident of Charity Hospital. He remained at the hospital until 1848.

In 1846, Bonzano survived the sinking of the New York steamship that was carrying passengers and bullion from Galveston to New Orleans.

In 1848, Bonzano was appointed by President James K. Polk to the New Orleans Mint as a melter and refiner. During the American Civil War, Bonzano moved up north until the capture of New Orleans in June 1862. He took charge of the closed New Orleans Mint upon his return, on recommendation. During the war the 12th Maine Infantry Regiment had occupied the building. Upon receipt of Bonzano's report, new minting equipment was sent to New Orleans. The building was refurbished and put back into active minting service by 1879, producing mainly silver coinage, including the famed Morgan silver dollar from 1879 to 1904.

During the war Bonzano felt a stronger sense of national allegiance and duty, and started to occupy other government leadership roles. In June 1862, the first Union meeting was held in New Orleans at Lyceum Hall (later used as New Orleans City Hall), and Bonzano was in attendance. He was elected as president and chairman of the Louisiana Union sympathizers during this first meeting; which happened to also be the first meeting of its kind in any of the Southern states.

The emancipation proclamation in September 1862 was signed by President Abraham Lincoln, effectively freeing enslaved Black people in the South. In August 1863, President Lincoln ordered Nathaniel P. Banks to oversee the creation of a new state constitution, and in December he granted Banks wide-ranging authority to create a new civilian government. An emancipation convention with delegates was formed by Banks in order navigate the intricate social and economic problems in Louisiana's Reconstruction era. Edward Henry Durell was the president of Bank's convention, and Bonzano served as a delegate and chairman alongside Rufus K. Howell and Christian Roselius.

From these leadership experiences, Bonzano was chosen in 1864 as a member of the 38th United States Congress representing the first district of New Orleans. The House of Representatives chairman from Massachusetts, Henry L. Dawes was in agreement but Bonzano was not able to take his official seat after an assault by Alexander Pope Field and his penknife of Hon. William D. Kelley of Pennsylvania. The news of this event with political violence was nationwide.

Shortly thereafter President Lincoln appointed Bonzano as the commissioner of tax for Louisiana, a position he kept only briefly. In 1868, Bonzano turned down an offer by President Ulysses S. Grant to become one of Louisiana's collectors of internal revenue.

In 1872, Bonzano chaired the Louisiana Republican electoral college. He was appointed by President Grant as the surveyor general from 1873 to 1874. From 1874 until 1883, Bonzano worked at the mint, starting as the superintendent and later as a coiner, melter and refiner. He ran for Louisiana State Treasurer in 1883, and was defeated.

== Death ==
He died on May 23, 1894, at his home the Hermitage plantation in St. Bernard Parish. The same Hermitage plantation in St. Bernard Parish had served as the camp headquarters for Gen. Andrew Jackson during the Battle of New Orleans (1815).

According to his obituary, Bonzano always remained a bachelor and did not have any children.

His nephew (the son of Adolphus Bonzano) had his same name. Maximilian Ferdinand Bonzano (1858–1920) married Mary Church Geary of Philadelphia in 1880, she was the daughter of the late Gen. John White Geary (1819–1873).

== See also ==
- German Coast
- Michael Hahn, another member of early 19th-century German New Orleans
