= Howells =

Howells may refer to:

== People ==
- Howells (surname)

== Places in the United States ==
- Howells, Colorado, a place in Colorado
- Howells, Nebraska
- Howells, New York
- Howells Junction, New York, a place in New York

== Business establishments ==
- Howells (department store), the largest department store in Cardiff, Wales, established by James Howell
- Howells & Stokes, a defunct architectural firm founded 1897 in New Haven, Connecticut, USA

== Educational establishments ==
- Howell's School, Denbigh, former independent girls' school in Denbigh in the United Kingdom.
- Howell's School, Llandaff, an independent girls' school in Llandaff in the United Kingdom.

== See also ==
- Howell (disambiguation)
