= Hellewell =

Hellewell is a surname. Notable people with the surname include:

- Alec Hellewell (1880–1934), English footballer
- Ben Hellewell (born 1992), Scottish rugby league footballer
- Parley G. Hellewell (born 1950), United States politician
- Robert de Hellewell (14th century, born 1285), gang member and member of parliament

== See also ==
- Helliwell
