= Paul Powell =

Paul Powell may refer to:

- Paul Powell (minister) (1933–2016), dean of Baylor University's George W. Truett Theological Seminary
- Paul Powell (director) (1881–1944), American film director
- Paul Powell (politician) (1902–1970), Illinois Secretary of State in the 1960s
- Paul Powell (baseball) (born 1948), American baseball player
- Paul Powell (footballer) (born 1978), English footballer
- Paul Warner Powell (1978–2010), executed American murderer
- Paul Powell (writer), British writer

== See also ==
- Paul Howell (disambiguation)
