= Senator Howell =

Senator Howell may refer to:

== Members of the United States Senate ==
- James B. Howell (1816–1880), U.S. Senator from Iowa from 1870 to 1871
- Jeremiah B. Howell (1771–1822), U.S. Senator from Rhode Island from 1811 to 1817

== United States state senate members ==
- Clark Howell (1863–1936), Georgia State Senate
- Cornelius C. Howell (1848–1902), Tennessee State Senate
- Daniel Howell (Wisconsin politician) (1807–1890), Wisconsin State Senate
- Elias Howell (1792–1844), Ohio State Senate
- Henry Howell (1920–1997), Virginia State Senate
- James F. Howell (1934–2026), Oklahoma State Senate
- Janet Howell (1944–2026), Virginia State Senate
- Jason Howell (born 1970), Kentucky State Senate
- Joseph Howell (1857–1918), Utah State Senate
- Max Howell (politician) (1915–1999), Arkansas State Senate
- Robert B. Howell (1864–1933), Nebraska State Senate
- Scott Howell (politician) (born 1953), Utah State Senate
- Vinton E. Howell (1840–1911), Illinois State Senate
- William Thompson Howell (1810–1870), Michigan State Senate
- William Tindall Howell (born 1941), South Carolina State Senate

== See also ==
- Anthony Howells (1832–1915), Ohio State Senate
