= Paul Howell =

Paul Howell may refer to:

- Paul Howell (golfer) (born 1991), American golfer and World Long Drive competitor
- Paul Howell (MEP) (1951–2008), British politician who served as a Member of the European Parliament
- Paul Howell (MP), British politician, MP for Sedgefield
- Paul Howell (rugby league), New Zealand rugby league player
- Paul Howell (murder victim) (died 1999), American man murdered in Oklahoma

== See also ==
- Paul Powell (disambiguation)
