= Octopon =

EP by Dark Stares
- Released: 1 July 2013
- Recorded: 2011–12 at Outhouse Studios (Reading, Berkshire)
- Genre: Alternative rock
- Length: 14:19
- Label: AWAL
- Producer: John Mitchell, Ben Humphreys, Dark Stares

Dark Stares chronology
Tell Your Friends (2012)	Octopon (2013)	Soul Contract (2014)

Singles from Octopon
- 1. "Bad Machine" Released: 1 October 2012; 2. "Shinigami" Released: 8 December 2012; 3. "Steal Your Girl" Released: 13 April 2013; 4. "Blackfyre" Released: 3 May 2013

Professional ratings
Review scores
Source	Rating
Metal Hammer	(positive)
Rock Sound	(positive)

Octopon is the second extended play by British rock band Dark Stares. The four track EP, self-produced by the band with John Mitchell and Ben Humphreys, was released with AWAL on 1 July 2013. All tracks from Octopon were released as singles with b-sides in chronological order, as well as music videos for both "Bad Machine" and "Shinigami".

In August 2013, Octopon was officially launched with MAMA at a headline show at the Barfly in Camden, London, with support from Alexis Kings.

In January 2014, opening track "Bad Machine" was aired live on The Dave Fanning Show on RTÉ 2fm. It was announced as U2 single "Invisible" as part of an admitted hoax by Fanning and Bono, after a three decade history of U2 single exclusives. Hot Press compared "Bad Machine" favorably: "[It] could have been U2 getting noisy and industrial again a la 'Elevation'".

== Track listing ==
All tracks are written by Dark Stares. All tracks produced by Dark Stares with John Mitchell and Ben Humphreys.

No.	Title	Length
1.	"Bad Machine"	3:08
2.	"Shinigami"	3:59
3.	"Steal Your Girl"	2:42
4.	"Blackfyre"	3:30
Total length:		14:19

== Personnel ==
- Miles Kristian Howell – lead vocals, guitar
- Taylor Howell – drums, percussion
- Harry Collins – lead guitar, backing vocals
- Brett Harland Howell – bass guitar, backing vocals
