= Edwin Howell =

Edwin Howell may refer to:

- Edwin E. Howell (1845–1911), American geologist and cartographer
- Edwin C. Howell (1860–1907), American whist and bridge player

== See also ==
- Edward Howell (disambiguation)
