= Holwell =

Holwell may refer to:

== Places ==
- Holwell, Dorset
- Holwell, Hertfordshire (formerly in Bedfordshire)
- Holwell, Leicestershire
- Holwell, Oxfordshire
- Holwell, Somerset
- Holwell, Tasmania

== Other uses ==
- Holwell (surname)
