= Attorney General Howell =

Attorney General Howell may refer to:

- Charles Gough Howell (1894–1942), Attorney General of Fiji
- David Howell (jurist) (1747–1824), Attorney General of Rhode Island

== See also ==
- General Howell (disambiguation)
