= Judge Howell =

Judge Howell may refer to:

- Beryl Howell (born 1956), judge of the United States District Court for the District of Columbia
- David Howell (jurist) (1747–1824), judge of the United States District Court for the District of Rhode Island
- George Evan Howell (1905–1980)m judge of the United States Court of Claims

== See also ==
- Justice Howell (disambiguation)
