= Rosemary Howell =

Australian lawyer and academic

Rosemary Jessamyn Howell is an Australian lawyer and academic. She specialises in the fields of negotiation and conflict resolution, and lectures at the University of New South Wales and the University of Melbourne. From 1980 to 1983 she was Secretary-General of the Law Council of Australia.

== Biography ==
Howell completed her Doctorate of Judicial Science (SJD) at the University of Technology Sydney in 2005 for her research with people for whom, and with whom, lawyers negotiate.

In 2011 she was appointed a visiting professor at Catholica University in Lisbon, Portugal and lectured on alternative dispute resolution. Since 2013, Howell has appeared in the International Who's Who of Mediation.

== Publications ==
- Howell, R. (1994). Quality management for legal practice. Sydney: Law Book Co.
