= Edward Howell =

Edward Howell may refer to:

- Edward Howell (died 1655) (1584–1655), English Puritan who settled in Massachusetts
- Edward Howell (actor) (1902–1986), British Australian actor and scriptwriter
- Edward Howell (cellist) (1846–1898), British cellist and music professor
- Edward Howell (politician) (1792–1871), U.S. representative from New York
- Edward Howell (racing driver), American stock car racing driver
- Edward H. Howell (1915–1994), American jurist in the state of Oregon
- Blue Howell (Edward E. Howell, 1905–1964), American football player and coach

== See also ==
- Edwin Howell (disambiguation)
