= Howell Davies (rugby, born 1885) =

Wales international rugby union & league footballer

Personal information
- Full name: Howell John Davies
- Born: 11 March 1885 Skewen, Wales
- Died: 2 July 1961 (aged 76) Cardiff, Wales

Playing information

Rugby union
- Position: Hooker
Club
Years	Team	Pld	T	G	FG	P
≤1912–≥12	Neath RFC
Representative
Years	Team	Pld	T	G	FG	P
1912	Wales	2	0	0	0	0

Rugby league
- Position: Forward
Club
Years	Team	Pld	T	G	FG	P
	Hunslet
- Source: scrum.com

Howell John Davies (11 March 1885 – 2 July 1961) was a Welsh rugby union and professional rugby league footballer who played in the 1910s. He played representative level rugby union (RU) for Wales, and at club level for Pontypool RFC, as a hooker, and club level rugby league (RL) for Hunslet, as a forward.

== International honours ==
Howell Davies won caps for Wales (RU) while at Neath RFC in 1912 against England, and Scotland.
