= Paul Howell (golfer) =

American World Long Drive competitor

Paul Howell (born June 11, 1991) is an American golfer and World Long Drive competitor. Howell competes in events that are sanctioned by the World Long Drive Association, which is owned by Golf Channel, part of the NBC Sports Group, and a division of Comcast. The season-long schedule features events airing live on Golf Channel, culminating in the Volvik World Long Drive Championship in September.

He is from Wilson, North Carolina.

== Career ==
Howell advanced to the quarterfinals in 2016 and 2017 at the Volvik World Long Drive Championship (Thackerville, Oklahoma), and in 2018 he finished runner-up at the Ak-Chin Smash in the Sun (Arizona), which aired live on Golf Channel.

He also advanced to the quarterfinals at both the Atlantic City Boardwalk Bash (New Jersey) and Tennessee Big Shots benefiting Niswonger Children's Hospital in 2018, both of which aired live on Golf Channel.

In the midst of his third season in World Long Drive, Howell captured his first win in Traverse City, Mich., claiming the inaugural Cherry Bomb Long Drive Championship in May 2018. The event was unsanctioned, but attracted 16 of the top 25-ranked World Long Drive Association members.

== Education ==
Prior to competing in World Long Drive, Howell played golf in college at Campbell University.
