= Admiral Howell =

Admiral Howell may refer to:

- Anthony Howell (admiral) (born 1947), South African Navy rear admiral
- John Adams Howell (1840–1918), U.S. Navy rear admiral
- John Cummings Howell (1819–1892), U.S. Navy rear admiral
