= Charlie Howell =

Australian rules footballer

Personal information
- Full name: Horatio Charles Howell
- Born: 13 September 1874; St Kilda, Victoria
- Died: 7 November 1934 (aged 60); South Yarra, Victoria
- Original team: Marlton

Playing career^{1}
Years	Club	Games (Goals)
1897–98	St Kilda	10 (0)
- ^{1} Playing statistics correct to the end of 1898.

Charlie Howell (13 September 1874 – 7 November 1934) was an Australian rules footballer who played with St Kilda in the Victorian Football League (VFL).
