= George Howell (cricketer) =

Australian cricketer

Personal information
- Born: 9 June 1822; Sydney, Australia
- Died: 18 November 1890 (aged 68); Sydney, Australia
- Source: ESPNcricinfo, 1 January 2017

George Howell (9 June 1822 – 18 November 1890) was an Australian cricketer. He played four first-class matches for New South Wales between 1855/56 and 1858/59.

== See also ==
- List of New South Wales representative cricketers
