= Joe Howell =

- Also known as: Joe, Stage, Jay
- Born: New York, New York, United States
- Genres: Hip hop, Gospel
- Occupation(s): Computer engineer audio engineer, record producer, songwriter
- Years active: 1991–present
- Labels: Arista, Universal, Bad Boy
- Website: www.stageten.com

Joe (Stage) Howell is an American executive, producer and engineer. He has worked on various projects with artists such as The Notorious B.I.G. and Total. In 1996 he received ASCAP's Rhythm and Soul Award. He co-wrote the R&B Hit "Can't You See" performed by Total.
