= Howell House =

Howell House may refer to:

in the United States (by state then city)

- Storm Cellar, William Howell House, listed on the National Register of Historic Places in White County
- Howell-Garner-Monfee House, North Little Rock, Arkansas
- Howell House (Escondido, California), listed on the National Register of Historic Places in San Diego County
- Mrs. George Arthur Howell Jr. House, Atlanta, Georgia, listed on the National Register of Historic Places in Fulton County
- William Dean Howells House (Cambridge, Massachusetts)
- Howell House (Reno, Nevada), listed on the NRHP in Washoe County
- Benjamin Howell Homestead, Parsippany, New Jersey, listed on the NRHP in Morris County
- Edgar W. Howell House, Buffalo, New York
- Howell-Butler House, Roseboro, North Carolina
- Howell Homeplace, Tarboro, North Carolina
- Alden and Thomasene Howell House, Waynesville, North Carolina
- John W. Howell House, Monmouth, Oregon, listed on the NRHP in Polk County
- Howell-Kohlhagen House, Roseburg, Oregon, listed on the NRHP in Douglas County
- Bybee–Howell House, Sauvie Island, Oregon
- Howell House (Philadelphia, Pennsylvania)
- Howell-Theurer House, Wellsville, Utah
