= Francis Howell =

Francis Howell may refer to:

- Francis Howell (philosopher) (1625–1679), English philosopher, principal of Jesus College, Oxford, 1657–1660
- Francis S. Howell (1863–1937), justice of the Nebraska Supreme Court
- Francis Clark Howell (1925–2007), American anthropologist

== Schools ==
- Francis Howell School District, a school district in St. Charles County, Missouri
  - Francis Howell High School
  - Francis Howell Central High School
  - Francis Howell North High School

== See also ==
- Frances Howell (born 1969), birth name of English author Frances Osborne
