= Howell Island Conservation Area =

Protected land in Missouri, U.S.

- IUCN category IV (habitat/species management area)
- Location within Missouri
- Location: Boone Township, St. Charles County, Missouri, USA
- Nearest city: Chesterfield, MO
- Coordinates: 38.663°N 90.709°W
- Area: 2,547 acres (10.3 km^{2})
- Established: 1978
- Governing body: Missouri Department of Conservation
- Website: Official website

Howell Island Conservation Area protected area covering 2,547 acres (10.31 km^{2}) and managed by the Missouri Department of Conservation on Howell Island located in the Missouri River in Boone Township, St. Charles County, Missouri, although the MDOC land surrounding the parking area is in St. Louis County. The island is bounded by the Missouri River on the north side and Centaur Chute to the south. The island is mostly forested in bottomland trees such as sycamore and cottonwood.

== History ==
The island was named for either Thomas or John Howell, who were early settlers in the area. The island was purchased by the Department of Conservation in 1978. The island was submerged during the Great Flood of 1993.

== Geography ==
This is a low lying, tree-covered island in the Missouri River. When the river is about 16 feet (4.9 m) at the St. Charles gauge (about 17.8 miles downstream), the Centaur causeway, which provides land access, is flooded. The island is covered by 2,336 acres (945 ha) of forest and woodland, 94 acres (38 ha) of old fields, and 117 acres (47 ha) of crop lands.

== Recreation ==
The area provides a limited amount of recreational activities. Camping is permitted by boaters who are traveling the Missouri River between April 1 and September 30, so long as they camp within 100 yards (91 m) of the river. There is an 8.0-mile (12.9 km) multi-use trail on the island open to hiking and biking. Horses are not permitted on the island.

=== Hunting and fishing ===
Fishing is permitted in the Missouri River, which borders the north side of the island for 5 miles (8.0 km), as well as the Centaur Chute. Hunting is permitted during hunting season provided that regulations are followed. Deer hunting is permitted by archery only.
