= Howel Brown =

(Richard) Howel Brown was Provost of St Mary's Cathedral, Glasgow from 1890 until 1904.

He was born in 1856 and educated at Harrow and Trinity College, Cambridge. He was ordained in 1884 and served after a curacy at St Giles in the Fields was Vicar of Holy Trinity, Lincoln's Inn Fields until his cathedral appointment.

Later he held incumbencies in Southgate and Enfield.

He died on 14 May 1928.

Religious titles
Preceded by Frederick Ridgeway	Rectors and Provosts of St. Mary's Cathedral, Glasgow; 1890 to 1904	Succeeded by Frederic Deane
