= Howel =

Howel is a given name. Notable people with the name include:

- Howel Brown (1856–1928), Glasgow cathedral provost
- Howel Davies (c. 1716–1770), Welsh Methodist minister
- Howel Gwyn (1806–1888), British politician
- Howel Harris Hughes (1873–1956), Welsh theologian and clergyman
- Howel Samuel (1881–1953), British politician
- Howel Williams (1898–1980), American geologist and volcanologist

== See also ==
- Howel, Kentucky, an American unincorporated community
- Howel–Evans syndrome
- Hywel Dda (died 949/950), anglicised as Howel the Good
- Howell, disambiguation page
