= Christopher Howell (cricketer) =

English cricketer (born 1977)

Personal information
- Full name: Christopher Robert Howell
- Born: 19 July 1977 (age 49); Kingston-upon-Thames, Surrey, England
- Batting: Right-handed
- Bowling: Right-arm medium

Domestic team information
- Years: Team
- 2005–2008: Staffordshire
- 1999–2002: Warwickshire Cricket Board

Career statistics
Competition	LA
Matches	6
Runs scored	49
Batting average	8.16
100s/50s	–/–
Top score	16
Balls bowled	12
Wickets	–
Bowling average	–
5 wickets in innings	–
10 wickets in match	–
Best bowling	–
Catches/stumpings	1/–
- Source: Cricinfo, 27 October 2010

Christopher Robert Howell (born 19 July 1977) is a former English cricketer. Howell was a right-handed batsman who bowled right-arm medium pace. He was born at Kingston-upon-Thames, Surrey.

Howell represented the Warwickshire Cricket Board in List A cricket. His debut List A match came against Berkshire in the 1999 NatWest Trophy. From 1999 to 2002, he represented the Board in 5 List A matches, the last of which came against Herefordshire in the 1st round of the 2003 Cheltenham & Gloucester Trophy which was held in 2002.

In 2005, Howell joined Staffordshire. Howell made his Minor Counties Championship debut for the county against Hertfordshire. From 2005 to 2008, he represented the county in 7 Championship matches, the last of which came against Bedfordshire. He also represented the county in 4 MCCA Knockout Trophy matches during the 2007 season.

He also represented Staffordshire in a single List A match against Surrey in the 2005 Cheltenham & Gloucester Trophy. In his career total of 6 List A matches, he scored 49 runs at a batting average of 8.16, with a high score of 16. In the field he took a single catch.
