= Sid Helliwell =

English footballer

Personal information
- Full name: Sidney Helliwell
- Date of birth: 30 January 1904
- Place of birth: Sheffield, England
- Date of death: 1939 (aged 34–35)
- Position: Centre half

Senior career*
Years	Team	Apps	(Gls)
- Wycliffe
1923	Sheffield Wednesday	0	(0)
1926	Reading	5	(2)
1927–1928	Tottenham Hotspur	8	(0)
1929–1931	Walsall	98	(8)
- Hednesford Town
1933	Halifax Town	1	(0)
- * Club domestic league appearances and goals

Sidney Helliwell (30 January 1904 – 1939) was a professional footballer who played for Wycliffe, Sheffield Wednesday, Reading, Tottenham Hotspur, Walsall, Hednesford Town, Halifax Town.

== Football career ==
After spells at Wycliffe F.C., Sheffield Wednesday and Reading the centre half joined Tottenham Hotspur. He made his debut for the club against Manchester United on 24 September 1927 and featured in nine matches for the Lilywhites in all competitions between 1927–28. Helliwell went on to play for Walsall where he played in 98 matches and scoring on eight occasions, Hednesford Town and finally Halifax Town.
