= Maximum Love =

British electronic music duo

- Origin: St Albans, England
- Genres: Electronic; electro; synthwave; chillwave; electropop
- Years active: 2014–present
- Labels: AWAL; Manta
- Members: Taylor Morgan Howell; Jordan Charles Howell
- Website: maximumlove.co.uk

Maximum Love is a British electronic music duo composed of brothers Taylor Morgan Howell and Jordan Charles Howell. The brothers began producing music as children. In 2013, they signed to AWAL and released their debut extended play Midnight Astronaut in 2014. They subsequently released EPs Dead by Dawn (2016) and Vision (2017) and studio albums Under the Shadow (2018), Jupiter (2020) and Apollo (2024). As of 2024, their music has been streamed over 100 million times.

== Career ==
=== 2011-2018: Early years ===
The brothers were brought up in the city of St Albans, England. They first encountered music production came as children, when they played the video game Music 2000 on the PlayStation. At first, they had only been making music together for fun. It wasn't until after the writing of "Twin Crimes" in around 2011, that they began to make music seriously, with the youngest member of the band being just 13 years old at the time. In late 2013, they pitched a demo of their debut EP Midnight Astronaut to AWAL. The demo was accepted, and the EP was released on 26 February 2014 to critical acclaim.

In November 2014, the band released their debut single "We've Just Begun". In summer 2015, the song went viral on Reddit, reaching the front page and topping the charts on the subreddit r/listentothis.

Following the release of singles "Sexy Girl" and "Obey", the band released their second EP, titled Dead by Dawn on 11 March 2016. "Feel Electric" from the EP received European radio support from Radio 105 and NPO 3FM. The song also featured a music video with the work of digital artist Beeple. In November 2016, Maximum Love released the single "They Don't Love You Like I Do", along with an animated music video, using scenes from the short film "The Life of Death" by Marsha Onderstijn. The song was featured on Electronic Gems. In December 2016, they released their single "Vision" in lead up to their EP of the same name, Vision, which they announced on 27 January 2017. Their first live performance was in London, headlining the Outland Sunset Neon Cruise in September 2018.

=== 2018-2020: Under the Shadow and Jupiter ===
In March 2018, Maximum Love released a trailer for an untitled fourth EP. However, soon after, the EP was scrapped. Instead, on 22 July 2018, they announced their debut album Under the Shadow, which released a month later on 24 August 2018. "Dream Getaway" from the album was featured on Electronic Gems and received radio support from Triple R's Mixed Signals and national support from BBC Radio 1Xtra on DJ Complexion's Future Wave Show. The song was also named in Complexion's "Best of 2020" compilation. Despite no singles being released, "Red Lights" from the album peaked at No. 1 on the iTunes chart in Estonia and No. 26 in Italy. Whilst "Starfields" reached No. 56 in the United States Electronic chart.

In January 2020, Maximum Love released the single "Let Go", followed shortly by their second album, Jupiter, on 31 January 2020. The album peaked at No. 3 in Canada on iTunes.

=== 2020-present: Apollo ===
In October 2021, the band released the single "Sometimes" on Manta Recordings. The single received radio support from XHUIA-FM and also included a remix from Grammy award-winning artist, Latroit, which received radio airplay from KCRW and was premiered by Electronic Groove

On 3 May 2022, Maximum Love released a teaser trailer on social media announcing their new single titled, "Forever", which released worldwide exactly one month later, on 3 June 2022. The song was featured on several popular music channels and was described by Visual Atelier 8 as a "dark, spacey ballad". On 25 November 2022, the band released the single "Feeling It".

On 17 February 2023, they released a new single titled "Dead to Me", followed by other singles "Heavy Lies the Crown" on 9 June 2023 and "A Star Will Rise" on 12 January 2024.

In October 2024, Maximum Love released a teaser announcing their new album, Apollo.

== Artistry ==
=== Style and influences ===
Maximum Love's sound has been described by DMC World magazine as "combining classic 80's influences and evocative, melancholic vocal lines with hazy retrospective soundscapes" The brothers have said that they use analogue instruments such as the Roland Juno-106 synthesiser and vocoders in the production of their music, and cited Daft Punk as an early influence. Asked about the band’s genre, the brothers said in an interview: "many people say that we’re electro or synthwave. You probably could categorise us as that, but to be honest, we don't even know... we’re just making noise that we think sounds good." they explained further that "[their sound] is a huge concoction of different things melted into one"

== In other media ==
In 2021, several of Maximum Love's songs were featured as part of the soundtrack for a cyberpunk RPG video game, The Ascent. Their contribution to the soundtrack received praise from critics. Their song "Loaded Gun" was also used in the Nvidia RTX reveal trailer for the game. Maximum Love’s music has frequently been used in videos and livestreams by a YouTube streamer Dr Disrespect. This included a promotional video in collaboration with Ubisoft for the release of the video game, Tom Clancy's Ghost Recon Breakpoint.

== Discography ==
=== Studio albums ===
| Title | Album details |
|---|---|
| Under the Shadow | Released: 24 August, 2018; Label: AWAL; Formats: LP, CD, digital download, streaming |
| Jupiter | Released: 31 January, 2020; Label: AWAL; Formats: LP, CD, digital download, streaming |
| Apollo | Released: 8 November, 2024; Label: AWAL; Formats: LP, CD, digital download, streaming |

=== Extended plays ===
| Title | Album details |
|---|---|
| Midnight Astronaut | Released: 26 February, 2014; Label: AWAL; Formats: CD, digital download, streaming |
| Dead by Dawn | Released: 11 March, 2016; Label: AWAL; Formats: CD, digital download, streaming |
| Vision | Released: 27 January, 2017; Label: AWAL; Formats: CD, digital download, streaming |

=== Singles ===
| Title | Year | Label | Format | Album |
|---|---|---|---|---|
| "We've Just Begun" | 2014 | AWAL | Digital download, streaming | Dead by Dawn |
| "Sexy Girl" | 2014 | AWAL | Digital download, streaming | Non-album single |
| "Obey" | 2015 | AWAL | Digital download, streaming | Dead by Dawn |
| "They Don't Love You Like I Do" | 2016 | AWAL | Digital download, streaming | Vision |
| "Vision" | 2016 | AWAL | Digital download, streaming | Vision |
| "I Still Believe" | 2017 | AWAL | Digital download, streaming | Non-album single |
| "Let Go" (including B-side "Ataraxia") | 2020 | AWAL | Digital download, streaming | Jupiter |
| "Sometimes" (including Latroit remix) | 2021 | Manta | Digital download, streaming | Apollo |
| "Forever" | 2022 | AWAL | Digital download, streaming | Apollo |
| "Feeling It" | 2022 | AWAL | Digital download, streaming | Apollo |
| "Dead to Me" | 2023 | AWAL | Digital download, streaming | Apollo |
| "Heavy Lies the Crown" | 2023 | AWAL | Digital download, streaming | Apollo |
| "A Star Will Rise" | 2024 | AWAL | Digital download, streaming | Apollo |

=== Compilation albums ===
| Title | Album details |
|---|---|
| Maximum Love Collection: Volume I | Released: November, 2017; Label: Self-released; Formats: LP |

=== Remixes ===
- Alexis Kings - Surrender (Maximum Love remix) (2022)
