= Scott Howell =

Scott Howell may refer to:

- Scott Howell (footballer) (born 1958), Australian rules footballer
- Scott Howell (political consultant), American conservative political consultant
- Scott Howell (politician) (born 1953), candidate for the United States Senate in Utah
- Scott A. Howell (born 1965), United States Air Force general
