= Rod Howell =

American tap dancer

Rod Howell (born March 23, 1975) is an American tap dancer, choreographer, dance teacher, and musician.

== Biography ==
Rod lives in Southern California, and moved there to teach for L.A. Underground dance convention, which ultimately went under. However, Rod did not enjoy teaching conventions so it worked out well for him. When Rod was young, he saw Corky Pigeon tap dancing on Silver Spoons and told his mother that he wanted to do that. His main teacher when learning tap dance was Gregg Russell, whom Rod now honors effectively. Rod Howell launched UnitedTaps.com in December 2005, which has a long history in the making.

=== Teachings and Projects ===
Rod has been a tap dance teacher and choreographer for 19+ years. He has taught at numerous dance studios and conventions across the United States, and now teaches at three studios. According to Rod Howell, he had a love/hate relationship with tap dancing as he was growing up.

Rod has created the world's largest free online tap dance video dictionary. He demonstrates how to do over 280 different tap steps and also offers the steps organized by level (his free online tap dance video syllabus). He also offers online classes and combinations at his new site tapdancelessons.com.

Rod worked with collaborative soap opera star Drew Tyler Bell on May 18, 2006, to create Garage Tap, which is the first online tap dance show.

As a musician, Rod has released two albums, No Rest in 2006, and his latest album titled "Action" at the end of 2008. His friend Joey Grady remixed his No Rest album, which was also released in 2006 entitled Parallel Inspiration.
