= William R. Howell =

William R. Howell is Chairman Emeritus, J.C. Penney Company, Inc. Holds bachelor of business administration degree. Joined J.C. Penney, a department store and catalog chain, in 1958. Held a variety of management positions. Elected Chairman of the Board and Chief Executive Officer in 1983.

Howell served as the chairman of the Southern Methodist University board of trustees from 1996 to 2000 shortly before retiring as Chairman of the Board of J.C. Penney in 1997. Director, ExxonMobil; American Electric Power Company, Inc.; Halliburton Co.; Pfizer, Inc.; The Williams Companies, Inc.; Deutsche Bank Trust Corporation and Deutsche Bank Trust Company Americas, non-public wholly owned subsidiaries of Deutsche Bank AG.
