= Vinton E. Howell =

American sheriff and politician (born 1840)

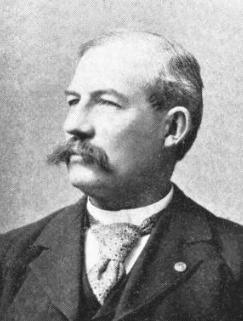

Member of the Illinois Senate
- In office 1893–1896

Personal details
- Born: November 30, 1840 Licking County, Ohio, US
- Died: April 5, 1911 (aged 70) Bloomington, Illinois
- Party: Republican
- Occupation: Sheriff, businessman

Vinton E. Howell (November 30, 1840 – April 5, 1911) was a sheriff, businessman, and state senator in Illinois. He fought in the Civil War.

== Biography ==
Howell was born on a farm in Licking County, Ohio. During the American Civil War, he served in the Illinois Volunteer Infantry. From 1886 to 1890 he was sheriff of McLean County. He served in the Illinois Senate from 1892 to 1896 for the Republican Party.

After a year of "failing health", Howell died in Bloomington, Illinois on April 5, 1911, aged 70.
