= USS Improve =

Minesweeper of the United States Navy

History

United States
- Name: USS Improve
- Builder: Savannah Machine and Foundry Company
- Laid down: 1 June 1943
- Launched: 26 September 1943
- Commissioned: 29 February 1944
- Decommissioned: 6 November 1946
- Fate: Sold into merchant service 24 February 1949; Sunk in 1953

General characteristics
- Class & type: Admirable-class minesweeper
- Displacement: 650 tons
- Length: 184 ft 6 in (56.24 m)
- Beam: 33 ft (10 m)
- Draft: 9 ft 9 in (2.97 m)
- Propulsion: 2 × ALCO 539 diesel engines, 1,710 shp (1.3 MW); Farrel-Birmingham single reduction gear; 2 shafts
- Speed: 14.8 knots (27.4 km/h)
- Complement: 104
- Armament: 1 × 3"/50 caliber gun DP; 2 × twin Bofors 40 mm guns; 1 × Hedgehog anti-submarine mortar; 2 × Depth charge tracks

Service record
- Part of: US Atlantic Fleet (1944-1945); US Pacific Fleet (1945-1946)
- Awards: 2 Battle stars

USS Improve (AM-247) was an Admirable-class minesweeper built for the U.S. Navy during World War II. She was built to clear minefields in offshore waters, and served the Navy in the North Atlantic Ocean and then in the Pacific Ocean. Improve received two battle stars for World War II service.

Improve was laid down 1 June 1943 by Savannah Machine & Foundry Co., Savannah, Georgia; launched 26 September 1943; sponsored by Mrs. J. E. Poythress and commissioned 29 February 1944.

== World War II North Atlantic operations ==
After shakedown, Improve reported to Mine Warfare School, Yorktown, Virginia, for duty as school ship. She was next assigned to convoy duty, sailed for Africa on 23 July, and arrived Mers-el-Kebir 10 August 1944. The mine-craft arrived off southern France for duty 25 August.

During this period Improve swept coastal waters, occasionally exchanging fire with German shore batteries. The enemy still controlled the Italian coastline in this area, and menaced sweeping operations with one-man torpedoes and other devices. The ship helped sweep a channel into Mentone 9–10 September and assisted sinking a one-man torpedo on the 10th. From October until March 1945 Improve swept mines and performed patrol duties at Bizerte; Cagliari, Sardinia; and Palermo, Sicily. Her group developed the new technique of using a Navy blimp to spot floating mines.

Following a brief operation off Anzio 3 March, Improve resumed operations off Sardinia and Sicily, before departing Oran 17 April for the United States.

== Transfer to the Pacific Fleet ==
USS Improve arrived Norfolk, Virginia, 5 May 1945 and, with the focus of war now shifted to the Pacific, sailed 5 July for duty in that theater. She proceeded via the Panama Canal to San Pedro, Los Angeles, arriving 26 July, and remained there on training duty until after the end of the Pacific War. The need for minesweeping operations was still great, however, and Improve sailed 17 September for Pearl Harbor, Eniwetok, Saipan, and Okinawa. She arrived off Sasebo 17 November for additional minesweeping duty and finished the year working off Formosa and in the Pescadores.

== Decommissioning ==
In March 1946 the ship was at Shanghai, earmarked for transfer to China, but she was subsequently returned to Seattle, Washington, and decommissioned 6 November 1946. Improve was eventually turned over to the Maritime Commission and sold 24 February 1949 to Ricardo Granja and renamed MV Ecuador. She was sunk in 1953.

== Awards ==
Improve received two battle stars for World War II service
