= Howell Township =

Howell Township may refer to:

- Howell Township, Johnson County, Arkansas, in Johnson County, Arkansas
- Howell Township, Michigan
- Howell Township, Howell County, Missouri
- Howell Township, New Jersey
- Howell Township, Towner County, North Dakota, in Towner County, North Dakota
