= Howell Harris (historian) =

British academic

Howell Harris is a professor of history at Durham University, who has published many books and journal articles on the history of US business. He has also been a member of the Arts and Humanities Research Council's Peer Review College since 2004.

In his spare time he enjoys allotment gardening.

== Books ==
- Right to Manage: Industrial Relations Policies of American Business in the 1940s (University of Wisconsin Press, 1982)
- Bloodless Victories: The Rise and Fall of the Open Shop in the Philadelphia Metal Trades, 1890-1940 (Cambridge University Press, 2000)
