= Howell High School =

Howell High School may refer to:

- Howell High School (Howell, Michigan), United States
- Francis Howell Central High School, Cottleville, Missouri, United States
- Howell High School (New Jersey), Farmingdale, New Jersey, United States
- Clement Howell High School, Providenciales, Turks and Caicos
