= General Howell =

General Howell may refer to:

- David Howell (British Army officer) (fl. 1970s–2010s), British Army major general
- Joshua B. Howell (1806–1864), Union Army brigadier general
- Philip Howell (1877–1916), British Army brigadier general
- Scott A. Howell (born 1965), U.S. Air Force lieutenant general

== See also ==
- Attorney General Howell (disambiguation)
