= George Howell Kidder =

George Howell Kidder (June 14, 1925 – August 20, 2009) was a resident of Concord, Massachusetts. Kidder was a Boston attorney and patron of the arts.

== Sources ==
- George Kidder at Cuttyhunk 1938
- Boston Globe: George H. Kidder obit
- Tributes: George Howell Kidder
