= Holwell (surname) =

Holwell is a surname. Notable people with the surname include:

- John Holwell (1649–1686?) English astrologer and mathematician
- John Zephaniah Holwell (1711–1798), employee of the English East India Company and writer on the East Indies
- Norman Holwell (1928–2020), British speed skater
- Richard J. Holwell (born 1946), District Judge, United States District Court for the Southern District of New York
- William Holwell (1726–1798), English cleric
