= Jamie Howell =

English footballer (born 1977)

Personal information
- Date of birth: 19 February 1977 (age 49)
- Place of birth: Rustington, England
- Position: Midfielder

Youth career
- 1993–1995: Arsenal

Senior career*
Years	Team	Apps	(Gls)
1995–1996	Arsenal	0	(0)
1996–1997	Portsmouth	0	(0)
1997	Torquay United	3	(0)
1997	Brighton & Hove Albion	0	(0)
1997–2007	Bognor Regis Town	426	(26)
2007	→ Burgess Hill Town (loan)		
2007–2009	Burgess Hill Town		
2009–2010	Bognor Regis Town		

Managerial career
- 2007–2009: Burgess Hill Town
- 2009: Bognor Regis Town (Assistant Manager)
- 2010: Bognor Regis Town (Joint Manager)
- 2010–2017: Bognor Regis Town
- 2017–2019: Eastbourne Borough
- 2024–2025: Bognor Regis Town (Joint Manager)
- 2025–2026: Bognor Regis Town
- * Club domestic league appearances and goals

Jamie Howell (born 19 February 1977) is an English former professional footballer and manager. He played in the football league for Torquay United. He represented England at Schoolboy and Youth level. He is the father of Brighton youth product Harry Howell.

== Career ==
Howell began his career as a trainee with Arsenal and was a member of the 1994 FA Youth Cup winning side. He turned professional in July 1995, but was released at the end of the following season, yet to make his Arsenal debut. In August 1996 Howell joined Portsmouth. He failed to appear in the Portsmouth first team, or for Notts County who he joined in March 1997.

In April 1997 he joined Torquay United on non-contract terms, making his debut on 12 April 1997 as a second-half substitute for Ian Hathaway in Torquay's 2–1 defeat at home to Barnet. He started the final two games of the season, defeats at home at Wigan Athletic and away to Doncaster Rovers, but was released at the end of the season.

He had a brief spell with Brighton & Hove Albion before joining Bognor Regis Town in October 1997, and went on to make over 400 appearances for them. He had a spell on loan with Burgess Hill Town in March 2007, before joining Burgess Hill as player-assistant manager in June 2007.

He was appointed as player-manager of Burgess Hill Town in December 2007. He remained in charge until March 2009 when he was sacked with the club just outside the relegation places.

Howell was appointed assistant to Darin Killpatrick at Bognor Regis Town on 1 June 2009, becoming joint manager with Killpartrick in February 2010 and manager in June 2010 with Killpartrick appointed as head coach.

Howell guided Bognor Bognor Regis Town to the National League South on 1 May 2017, beating Dulwich Hamlet 2–1.

Howell was appointed the new Eastbourne Borough manager on 3 May 2017. He was sacked by the club on 16 February 2019.

In December 2024, Howell returned to Bognor Regis Town, being appointed joint-manager alongside Michael Birmingham.

In August 2025, Howell became sole manager.
