= Ron Howell (footballer, born 1949) =

English footballer

Personal information
- Full name: Ronald Roger Howell
- Date of birth: 22 May 1949 (age 77)
- Place of birth: Tottenham, England
- Position: Midfielder

Senior career*
| Years | Team | Apps | (Gls) |
| 1966–1970 | Millwall | 14 | (0) |
| 1970–1971 | Cambridge United | 12 | (1) |
| 1971–1972 | Kettering Town | ? | (?) |
| 1972–1973 | Swindon Town | 25 | (1) |
| 1973–1974 | Brighton & Hove Albion | 27 | (9) |
| | Tooting & Mitcham United | ? | (?) |
| | Barnet | ? | (?) |
| Total | | 78 | (11) |
- * Club domestic league appearances and goals

Ronald Roger Howell (born 22 May 1949 in Tottenham, Middlesex, England), is an English footballer who played as a midfielder in the Football League.
