= Huwal of the West Welsh =

Early to mid-10th century Brittonic monarch

Huwal was a Brittonic monarch of the early to mid-10th century whose name appears in the Anglo-Saxon Chronicle as the ruler of the "West Welsh". His identity is a matter of debate: "West Welsh" in medieval English sources usually refers to the Cornish or Dumnonians, suggesting Huwal may have been an otherwise unknown king of that region, but many scholars identify him instead with Hywel Dda of Deheubarth, in western Wales.

== Source and interpretations ==
Huwal is recorded just once in the entry for 926 in manuscript D of the Anglo-Saxon Chronicle as "Huwal king of the West Welsh" ("Huwal West Wala cyning"). The only other reference to him is a duplicate of this entry in John of Worcester's early 12th-century work Chronicon ex chronicis. In the Chronicle, Huwal is one of several kings who signed a treaty at Eamont Bridge accepting King Æthelstan of England as their overlord.

"West Welsh" is usually an English term for the southwestern Britons, the Cornish or Dumnonians, and some historians believe this Huwal to be an otherwise unrecorded Cornish leader. According to Philip Payton of the Institute of Cornish Studies, Huwal is "generally recognised as the last in a line of independent (or semi-independent) Cornish (Dumnonian) kings". As such the final submission of Cornwall to Wessex may be attributed to him.

However, most historians identify the Huwal of the Anglo-Saxon Chronicle with Hywel Dda of Deheubarth, whose kingdom was located in south-west Wales. Hywel was one of a number of rulers from western and northern Britain who witnessed Æthelstan's charters in the 920s and 930s. While noting an otherwise unknown Cornish Huwal is possible, historian John Edward Lloyd believed that Hywel Dda is intended and that "West Wales is used in this passage in an unusual sense". According to Thomas Charles-Edwards, the last king of Cornwall was Dungarth, who died in 875. He argued that while West Wales meant Cornwall to the West Saxons, Manuscript D of the Anglo-Saxon Chronicle was written from a Mercian point of view. To the Mercians, West Wales probably meant Dyfed (the centre of power of Deheubarth) in south-west Wales in distinction from the south-eastern Welsh Kingdom of Gwent.
