= Charles Andrew Howell III =

American businessman and politician

Charles Andrew Howell III (December 30, 1930 – October 27, 2011) was an American businessman and politician who was involved in historic preservation projects in Tennessee.

== Personal life and education ==
The son of Charles A. Howell Jr. and Helen Johnson Buchanan Howell, Howell was born in Brentwood, Tennessee, and raised in Nashville. He was a graduate of Walter Stokes School and Hillsboro High School. After graduating from Hillsboro, he attended The University of the South at Sewanee (class of '53) where he joined the Kappa Sigma fraternity. The following year Howell attended David Lipscomb College prior to enlisting in the 105th Fighter Squadron of the Air National Guard. His squadron was activated in early 1951 and he spent the next 18 months on active duty. While on active duty, Howell took classes in radio broadcasting. Upon release from duty, he worked briefly at WKSR (AM) in Pulaski, Tennessee.

Howelllater re-enrolled at Lipscomb. Shortly after, he met Julie Harb and followed her to Los Angeles when she moved there with her family. He attended George Pepperdine College there and married Harb on June 10, 1954.

== Career ==
Upon his return to Nashville, Howell entered the family construction business with his father, Charles A. Howell Jr. His career in construction spanned the years 1954 until 1979 when he joined the administration of Governor Lamar Alexander as Assistant Commissioner of Finance and Administration, Commissioner of Conservation, State Historic Preservation Officer, Chairman of the Oil and Gas Board, Officer of the National Association of State Outdoor Recreation Liaison Officers and Conservator of The Capitol.

== Politics ==
Howell was elected to the First Metropolitan Council (1962–65), ran on the Barry Goldwater ticket in 1964 for Public Service Commission, elected to the Tennessee House of Representatives (1968–70) where his seatmate and mentor was Representative Dr. Harold Bradley, a Democrat. He ran on the Republican ticket for the Tennessee State Senate but lost the election to Senator Douglas Henry, a Democrat. Howell was an elector for the 1988 presidential election.

After Governor Alexander's tenure completed in 1987, Howell renewed his interest in Trust For The Future, the organization he had founded earlier. He also regained interest in Republican politics and was elected to the Tennessee Republican Party Executive Committee. He later resigned. In 2000 he sought election to the county office of Assessor of Property.

After retiring from the state government, Howell accepted an offer to lead the Cumberland Museums during a time of expansion and the construction of a new wildlife park for this region. When reviewing the plans for the new construction projects he discovered some environmental issues and organized the Tennessee Initiative for Environmental Sensitivity in Construction (TIES). In May 1990, he produced a conference in Washington including speakers who were leaders in their respective parts of the construction industry, the environment and public policymakers.

== Other activities ==
=== Historic preservation ===
Howell entered the field of historic preservation on a project at Travelers Rest in Nashville. Other restoration projects included the "Wynnewood" at Castalian Springs, Tennessee, the Silver Dollar Saloon in Nashville, and the James K. Polk Home in Columbia, Tennessee, the Andrew Jackson Tomb at the Hermitage and at historic Rugby, Tennessee. Howell worked as a pro bono consultant on the Customs House in Nashville, the Union Station in Nashville, the North Front Building at Belmont, among others.

=== Civic involvement ===
In 1973 Howell joined the Nashville Rotary Club, subsequently serving on the board as an officer and active committee member. Also in the early 1970s, along with Bill Bradshaw, Howell helped form a segregation academy—Franklin Road Academy, which serves kindergarten through 12th grade—standing as the chairman of the founding board.

He has served as the board chair or CEO of the following: The Cumberland Museums of Nashville, Historic Nashville, Inc., The Nashville, Thermal Transfer Corporation, The Salvation Army Advisory Board, Franklin Road Academy, (co-founder) The Tennessee Commercial Recycling Project, Opportunity House, Inc., The Tennessee Heritage Alliance. He also organized and directed a civic improvement endeavor for Nashville known as "Music City Proud." He has also organized an annual "Descendants’ Day" in Nashville to encourage the community to remain mindful of the needs of future generations to a sound environment.

=== Publications ===
- Publisher of the Cumberland Journal
- Essays—Over 300 in several publications
- Co-Editor and Publisher of "Healthy Buildings for a Better Earth"
- Author and publisher "The Greening of a Conservative"
- Author and publisher "Waiting for the Stones to Cry Out"
- Author of the historical novel "Home to Hardscuffle and All That Jazz"
- Author and publisher of two monographs on public assets management:
- "The Public Assets Trust Fund’
- "A Compelling Proposal"
- Co-writer of the hymn- "Loving Our Neighbors Across Time"

== Significant honors ==
His awards and recognitions include life membership in the Ladies Hermitage Association 1986, life membership in the Tennessee Recreation and Parks Association 1987, life membership in the Rugby Restoration Association 1972, Preservation Award for outstanding achievement from Historic Nashville, Inc. 1980 Award for Preservation of Mill Springs Mill from the Army Corps of Engineers 1977, Award from the Tennessee Arts Commission for his advocacy for historic preservation 1977, Fisk University Exemplary Service Award 1984, Fellow Award from the National Association of State Outdoor Recreation Liaison Officers 1985, Appreciation Award from the National Rehabilitation Association 1985, award from the National Park Service for his work in advocating for improved management of public assets 1982, The Friend In Need Award from the Tennessee Environmental Council 1991 and the Public Service Award from the U. S. Department of the Interior 1983.

December 12, 1984 was designated as Charles Howell III Day in Nashville, Tennessee, by Mayor Richard Fulton, Historic Nashville, Inc. - For his work in saving The Customs House, North Front-Belmont University, The Ryman Auditorium, Union Station, and the Second Avenue Historic District.
