= Rufus K. Howell =

American judge (1820–1890)

Rufus King Howell (c. 1820 – August 12, 1886) was an American judge and lawyer. He served as justice of the Louisiana Supreme Court from April 3, 1865, to January 9, 1877.

== Career ==
In August 1863 after the emancipation proclamation was signed, President Abraham Lincoln ordered Gen. Nathaniel P. Banks to oversee the creation of a new Louisiana state constitution, and in December he granted Banks wide-ranging authority to create a new civilian government. An emancipation convention with delegates was formed by Banks in order navigate the intricate social and economic problems in Louisiana's Reconstruction era. Edward Henry Durell was the president of Bank's convention, and Rufus K. Howell served as a delegate and chairman alongside Maximilian F. Bonzano and Christian Roselius.

=== Louisiana Supreme Court ===
In 1865, Howell was appointed by Governor James Madison Wells to the newly constituted post-American Civil War court. Although he formally held his seat until January 1877, he did not participate in the last sitting of the court held in that month. The court was thereafter completely replaced by the new Democratic administration which took over the state government at that time.

He testified of the enmity felt towards the U.S. Government and Loyalists.

== See also ==
- New Orleans Massacre of 1866

Political offices
Preceded by Newly constituted court	Justice of the Louisiana Supreme Court; 1865–1877	Succeeded by Court abolished
