= Ron Howell (Australian footballer) =

Australian rules footballer (1919–2015)

Personal information
- Full name: Ronald Ross Howell
- Born: 14 November 1919; Carlton, Victoria
- Died: 7 March 2015 (aged 95); Tweed Heads, New South Wales
- Original team: Abbotsford
- Height: 174 cm (5 ft 9 in)
- Weight: 79 kg (174 lb)

Playing career^{1}
Years	Club	Games (Goals)
1941–42	North Melbourne	9 (2)
- ^{1} Playing statistics correct to the end of 1942.

Ronald Ross Howell (14 November 1919 – 7 March 2015) was an Australian rules footballer who played with North Melbourne in the Victorian Football League (VFL).
