= Welsh surnames =

Fixed surnames were adopted in Wales from the 15th century onwards. Until then, the Welsh had a patronymic naming system.

== History ==
In 1292, 48 per cent of Welsh names were patronymics and, in some parishes, over 70 per cent. Other names were derived from nicknames, a few non-hereditary personal names and, rarely, occupational names.

Patronymic names changed from generation to generation, with a person's baptismal name being linked by ap, ab ('son of') or ferch ('daughter of') to the father's baptismal name. For example, Evan, son of Thomas, would be known as Evan ap Thomas; Evan's son, John, would be John ab Evan; and John's son Rees would be Rees ap John.

Patronymics could be extended with names of grandfathers and earlier ancestors, to perhaps the seventh generation. Names such as Llewelyn ap Dafydd ab Ieuan ap Gruffudd ap Meredydd were not uncommon. Those extended patronymics were essentially a genealogical history of the male line. The Encyclopaedia of Wales surmises that the system may have been Welsh law, in which it was essential for people to know how people were descended from an ancestor. These laws were decaying by the later Middle Ages, and the patronymic system was gradually replaced by fixed surnames, although the use of patronymic names continued up until the early 19th century in some rural areas.

In the reign of Henry VIII surnames became hereditary amongst the Welsh gentry, and the custom spread slowly amongst commoners. Areas where England's influence was strong had abandoned patronymics earlier, as did town families and the wealthy.

New surnames retained the ap in several cases, mainly in reduced form at the start of the surname, as in Upjohn (from ap John), Powell (from ap Hywel), Price & Pryce (from ap Rhys), Pugh (from ap Hugh), Pritchard (from ap Richard), and Bowen (from ab Owen). Alternatively, the ap was simply dropped entirely.

The most common surnames in modern Wales result from adding an s to the end of the name, as in Jones, Roberts and Edwards. Patronymic surnames with the short -s form are recorded in various parts of England dating back to the Middle Ages. As most Welsh surnames are derived from patronymics and often based on a small set of first names, Welsh communities have families bearing the same surnames who are not related. It cannot be assumed that two people named Jones, even in the same village, must have inherited the surname from a common ancestor.

== Present day ==
The stock of Welsh surnames is small. This is partly attributable to the reduction in the variety of baptismal names after the Protestant Reformation. Typical Welsh surnames – Evans, Jones, Williams, Davies, Thomas – were found in the top ten surnames recorded in England and Wales in 2000.

An analysis of the geography of Welsh surnames commissioned by the Welsh Government found that 718,000 people in Wales, nearly 35% of the Welsh population, have a family name of Welsh origin, compared with 5.3% in the rest of the United Kingdom, 4.7% in New Zealand, 4.1% in Australia, and 3.8% in the United States. A total of 16.3 million people in the countries studied had a name of Welsh origin.

It is not uncommon for five or more of the starting XV for the Wales national rugby union team to be named Jones. For instance, all of the following played in the same period and are not immediately related to any of the others: Adam Jones, Dafydd Jones, Ryan Jones, Stephen Jones, Mark Jones, Adam M. Jones, Alun Wyn Jones, and Duncan Jones.

The prevalence of names such as Jones, Williams and Thomas brought a need for further distinction and in the 19th century a trend started for double surnames, created by prefixing the name of a house, parish or the mother's surname, as in "Cynddylan Jones". A hyphen was sometimes later introduced, for example "Griffith-Jones".

== Revival of patronymics ==
Although the vast majority of Welsh surnames are family names, there has been a limited revival of patronymics in modern Wales, especially among Welsh speakers. Alternatively, given surnames are used, as in the case of politician Rhun ap Iorwerth, folk singer and political figure Dafydd Iwan (Dafydd Iwan Jones), opera singer Bryn Terfel (Bryn Terfel Jones), classical singer Shân Cothi, and the late actress Myfanwy Talog.

== See also ==
- Celtic onomastics
- Irish name
- Patronymic#Welsh and Cornish
- Scottish Gaelic personal naming system
- Welsh toponymy
