= Howell M. Estes II =

United States general (1914–2007)

Howell Marion Estes Jr.
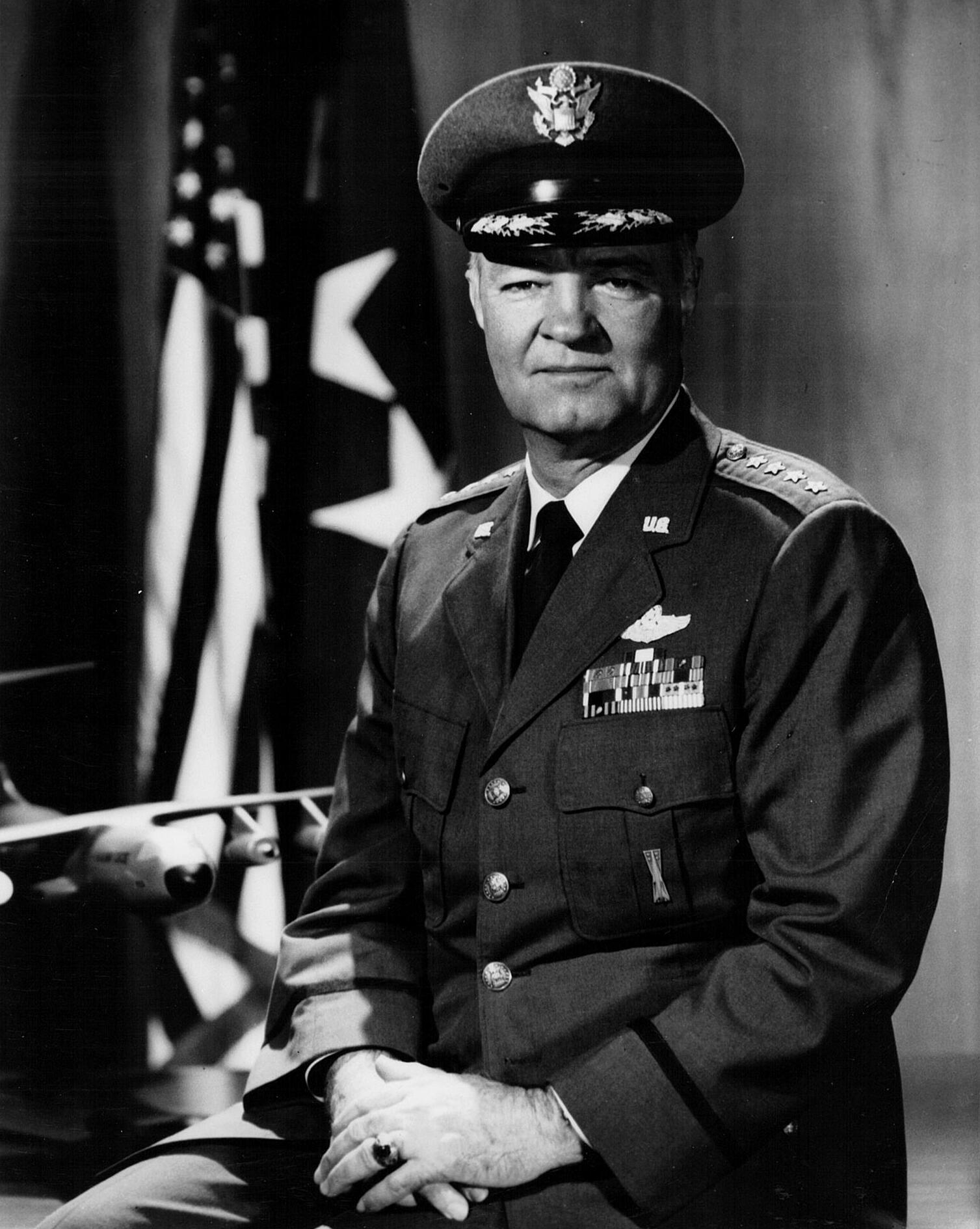
- General Howell M. Estes Jr.
- Born: September 18, 1914; Fort Oglethorpe, Georgia, United States
- Died: July 2, 2007 (aged 92); Bethesda, Maryland, United States
- Burial place: Arlington National Cemetery
- Relatives: General Howell M. Estes III (son)
- Military career
- Allegiance: United States of America
- Branch: United States Air Force
- Service years: 1936–1969
- Rank: General
- Commands: 23rd Pursuit Squadron; 1st Air Base Group; 44th Bomb Wing; 320th Bombardment Wing; Military Airlift Command
- Conflicts: Korean War
- Awards: Air Force Distinguished Service Medal (2) Distinguished Service Medal (U.S. Army); Legion of Merit (3); Distinguished Flying Cross; Air Medal (2); American Defense Service Medal; American Campaign Medal; World War II Victory Medal; Army of Occupation Medal; National Defense Service Medal (2); Korean Service Medal (4); Antarctica Service Medal; Air Force Longevity Service Award (8); Czechoslovak War Cross 1939–1945 United Nations Korea Medal

Howell Marion Estes Jr. (or Howell Marion Estes II) (September 18, 1914 – July 2, 2007) was a general in the United States Air Force and commander of the Military Air Transport Service, later renamed the Military Airlift Command.

== Biography ==
Estes was born in Fort Oglethorpe, Georgia, graduated from the United States Military Academy in June 1936 and began his military career at Fort Bliss, Texas. He was appointed platoon and troop commanding officer of the 7th Cavalry, and later was assigned to Headquarters 1st Cavalry Division, as aide to the commanding general. He entered pilot training school in June 1939. Upon graduation in April 1940, he transferred to the Army Air Corps and subsequently was assigned as a flight instructor at Brooks Field, Texas.

In August he was appointed commandant of cadets at the Brooks Field Advanced Flying School. He became director of flying for the school in July 1942 and was redesignated director of training the following year. In February 1944, he assumed command of Blackland Army Air Base, Waco, Texas. With the closing of Blackland, he assumed command of Lubbock Army Air Field at Lubbock, Texas, in July 1944.

In January 1946, Estes became chief of the Plans and Policy Branch, Operations Division, U.S. Air Forces in Europe (USAFE), at Wiesbaden, Germany. He was named chief of the plans section, Operations Division in April and three months later was designated deputy assistant chief of staff, operations. In November 1947 he became assistant chief of staff, plans, at USAFE.

Estes returned to the United States and in June 1949 completed courses at the Air War College, Maxwell Air Force Base, Alabama. He was then assigned to March Air Force Base, California, where he assumed command of the 1st Air Base Group and shortly thereafter became deputy commander and chief of staff, 22d Bombardment Wing and later became commander of the wing. In January 1951, he became commander of the 44th Bombardment Wing at March Air Force Base.

During the Korean War, Estes was on temporary duty overseas from March to July 1951 as vice commander of the Far East Air Forces Bomber Command. During that time, he flew 25 combat missions over Korea with a total of 328 hours in B-29s.

He assumed command of the 320th Bombardment Wing at March Air Force Base in August 1951 and was named commander of the 12th Air Division in 1952. In October, as an additional duty, he was designated commander, Air Task Group 7.4, Joint Task Force Seven, for the overseas atomic test, Operation Castle. He relinquished command of the 12th Air Division in July 1953 and took active command of Air Task Group 7.4. During the operational phase of Operation Castle in 1954, he spent four months at the Pacific Proving Grounds on Eniwetok Atoll.

Estes was assigned as director of weapon systems operations, Wright Air Development Center of the Air Research and Development Command (ARDC), Wright-Patterson Air Force Base, Ohio, in July 1954. This directorate was transferred to the Office of the Deputy Commander for Weapon Systems, ARDC in August 1955, and became known as Detachment 1, at which time Estes became assistant deputy commander for weapon systems, Headquarters ARDC and commander, Detachment 1.

Estes was transferred to Headquarters U.S. Air Force, Washington, D.C., as the Assistant Chief of Staff, Air Defense Systems, in August 1957, and was reassigned as Assistant Deputy Chief of Staff, Operations, in June 1958. In April 1961, Estes became the deputy commander for aerospace systems, Air Force Systems Command (AFSC), in Los Angeles, California, and in October 1962, he became vice commander of AFSC at Andrews Air Force Base in Maryland.

In July 1964, Estes became commander of the Military Airlift Command (then the Military Air Transport Service) with headquarters at Scott Air Force Base, Illinois.

Estes was presented the General H.H. Arnold Trophy, the highest military honor given by the Arnold Air Society, on April 26, 1967, for outstanding contributions to military aviation and aerospace programs.

He died at his Bethesda, Maryland home in 2007.

== Education ==
- 1931 Graduate Hampton High School, Virginia
- 1936 Graduate U.S. Military Academy, West Point, N.Y.
- 1940 Primary and Advanced Flying Schools, Randolph and Kelly fields, Texas
- 1949 Air War College, Maxwell Air Force Base, Ala.

== Assignments ==
- June 1936 – June 1939: Various duties, 7th Cavalry and 1st Cavalry Division, Fort Bliss, Texas
- June 1939 – April 1940: Flying school, Love, Randolph and Kelly fields, Texas
- April 1940 – February 1944: Commanding officer, 23d Pursuit Squadron; commandant of flying cadets; and then director of training, Brooks Field, Texas
- February 1944 – June 1944: Commander, Blackland Army Air Base, Waco, Texas
- July 1944 – December 1945: Commander, Lubbock Army Air Force Base, Lubbock, Texas
- January 1946 – July 1948: Chief, Plans and Policy Branch; chief, Plans Section; deputy assistant chief of staff, operations; and later assistant chief of staff, plans, Headquarters U.S. Air Forces, Europe
- July 1948 – June 1949: Student, Air War College, Maxwell Air Force Base, Alabama
- June 1949 – February 1951: Commander, 1st Air Base Group; deputy commander and commander, 22d Bomb Wing; commander, 44th Bomb Wing, March Air Force Base, California
- March 1951 – July 1951: 98th Bomb Wing, Fairchild Air Force Base, Washington, with temporary duty to Korea as vice commander, Far East Air Forces Bomber Command
- August 1951 – July 1953: Commander, 320th Bomb Wing and later commander, 12th Air Division, March Air Force Base, California
- August 1953 – July 1954: Commander, Air Task Group 7.4, Kirtland Air Force Base, New Mexico, with temporary duty on Eniwetok Island during operational phase of Operation Castle
- July 1954 – August 1957: Director, Weapon Systems Operations, Wright Air Development Center; assistant deputy commander for weapon systems with additional duty as commander, Detachment 1, Headquarters ARDC, and director of systems management, Wright-Patterson Air Force Base, Ohio
- August 1957 – March 1961: Assistant chief of staff, Air Defense Systems; and later assistant deputy chief of staff, operations, Headquarters U.S. Air Force, Washington, D.C.
- April 1961 – October 1962: Deputy commander, Aerospace Systems (Air Force Systems Command), Los Angeles, California
- October 1962 – July 1964: Vice commander, Air Force Systems Command, Andrews Air Force Base, Maryland
- July 1964 – July 1969: Commander, Military Air Transport Service (later Military Airlift Command), Scott Air Force Base, Illinois

August 1, 1969 – Retired

== Awards and decorations ==
US Air Force Command Pilot Badge
Basic Missile Maintenance Badge

Air Force Distinguished Service Medal with one bronze oak leaf cluster
Army Distinguished Service Medal
Legion of Merit with two bronze oak leaf clusters
Distinguished Flying Cross
Air Medal with two bronze oak leaf clusters
American Defense Service Medal
American Campaign Medal
World War II Victory Medal
Army of Occupation Medal (with "Germany" and "Japan" clasps)
National Defense Service Medal with one bronze service star
Korean Service Medal with four bronze service stars
Antarctica Service Medal
Air Force Longevity Service Award with one silver and two bronze oak leaf clusters
Czechoslovak War Cross (1939)
United Nations Korea Medal

== Effective dates of promotion ==
Insignia	Rank	Date
	General	July 19, 1964
	Lieutenant general	May 19, 1961
	Major general	October 24, 1956
	Brigadier general	December 3, 1952
	Colonel	August 14, 1943
	Lieutenant colonel	May 13, 1942
	Major	November 15, 1941
	Captain	September 9, 1940
	First lieutenant	June 12, 1939
	Second lieutenant	June 12, 1936
