= Howell M. Estes III =

United States Air Force general (1941–2024)

Howell Marion Estes III
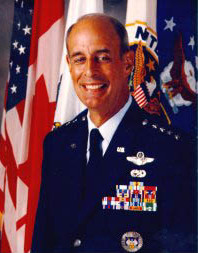
- General Howell M. Estes III
- Born: December 16, 1941; San Antonio, Texas, U.S.
- Died: March 18, 2024 (aged 82)
- Relatives: Howell M. Estes Jr. (father)
- Military career
- Allegiance: United States of America
- Branch: United States Air Force
- Service years: 1965–1998
- Rank: General
- Commands: North American Aerospace Defense Command; United States Space Command; Air Force Space Command; 7th Air Force
- Conflicts: Vietnam War
- Awards: Defense Distinguished Service Medal (3); Air Force Distinguished Service Medal (2); Defense Superior Service Medal; Legion of Merit

General Howell M. Estes III (December 16, 1941 – March 18, 2024) served as commander in chief in the North American Aerospace Defense Command (NORAD) and the United States Space Command (USSC), and served as commander in the Air Force Space Command (AFSC), headquartered at Peterson Air Force Base, Colorado. As commander, the general was responsible for the air sovereignty of the United States and Canada, providing tactical warning and attack assessment, directing space control and support operations, directing satellite control, warning, space launch and ballistic missile operations missions.

Estes was on the board of directors DigitalGlobe from May 14, 2007; In February 2011 he became the chair of the board.

On December 13, 2018, Maxar Technologies announced that "the Maxar Board of Directors has elected retired U.S. Air Force Gen. Howell M. Estes III as Chair, effective January 1, 2019."

== Background ==
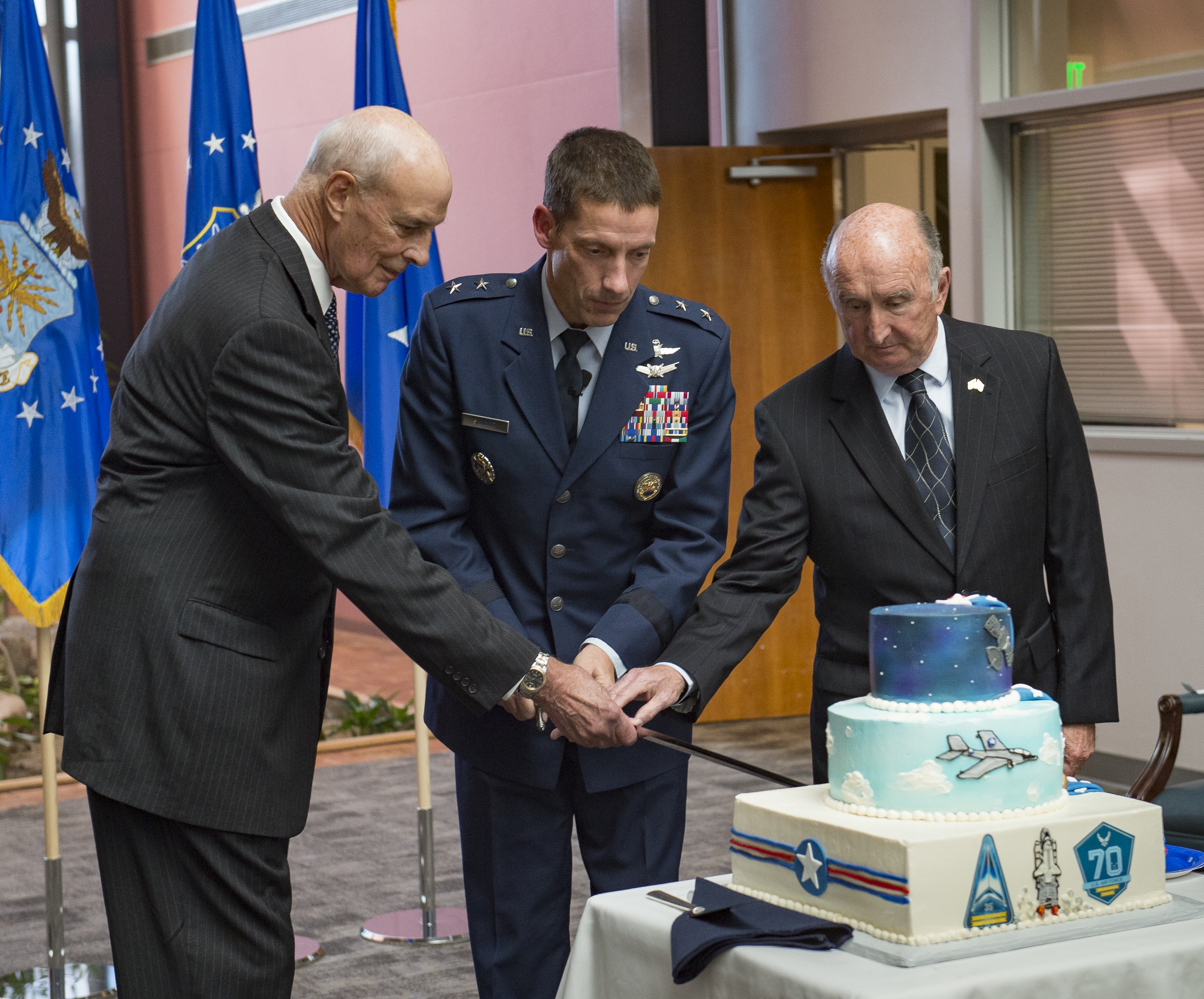
Howell Estes celebrating Air Force 70th anniversary in 2017.

Estes was born on December 16, 1941. He graduated from the United States Air Force Academy in 1965. He has commanded both operational and maintenance squadrons, the Air Force's only stealth fighter unit, and an air division and numbered air force. Prior to his current position, he served as director for operations (J-3), the Joint Staff, the Pentagon, Washington, D.C. He also co-authored "Strategic and Doctrinal Implications of Deep Attack," the concept of operations for the Defense of Central Europe. A command pilot with more than 4,500 flying hours, he flew 169 combat missions as an F-4 pilot during the Vietnam War. During the Gulf War he served as deputy chief of staff for operations, Strategic Air Command. He retired on October 1, 1998, and died on March 18, 2024, at the age of 82.

== Education ==
- 1965 Bachelor of Science degree in military science, United States Air Force Academy, Colorado Springs, Colorado
- 1975 Master of Arts degree in public administration, Auburn University, Alabama
- 1975 Air Command and Staff College, Maxwell Air Force Base, Alabama
- 1975 National Military Commonwealth degree, Auburn University, Alabama
- 1983 National War College, Fort Lesley J. McNair, Washington, D.C.

== Assignments ==
- June 1965 – November 1966, student, undergraduate pilot training program, Moody Air Force Base, Georgia
- November 1966 – April 1967, student, F-4 qualification training, MacDill Air Force Base, Florida
- April 1967 – May 1969, F-4D pilot, 335th Tactical Fighter Squadron, Seymour Johnson Air Force Base, North Carolina
- May 1969 – May 1970, F-4E commander, 34th Tactical Fighter Squadron, Korat Royal Thai Air Force Base, Thailand
- May 1970 – April 1972, F-4E pilot and chief of standardization and evaluation, 32nd Tactical Fighter Squadron, Camp New Amsterdam (now Soesterberg Air Base), Netherlands
- May 1972 – July 1973, weapons tactics staff officer, Headquarters U.S. Air Forces in Europe, Lindsey Air Station, West Germany
- July 1973 – August 1974, command briefing officer, Headquarters U.S. Air Forces in Europe, Ramstein Air Base, West Germany
- August 1974 – August 1975, student, Air Command and Staff College, Maxwell Air Force Base, Alabama
- August 1975 – January 1979, air operations staff officer, Europe-NATO Division, Office of the Deputy Chief of Staff for Plans and Operations, Headquarters U.S. Air Force, Washington, D.C.
- February 1979 – August 1982, commander, 20th Tactical Fighter Training Squadron; then commander, 35th Equipment Maintenance Squadron; then assistant deputy commander and subsequently deputy commander for maintenance; 35th Tactical Fighter Wing, George Air Force Base, California
- August 1982 – July 1983, student, National War College, Fort Lesley J. McNair, Washington, D.C.
- July 1983 – June 1984, deputy assistant director for joint and National Security Council matters, directorate of plans, Office of the Deputy Chief of Staff for Plans and Operations, Headquarters U.S. Air Force, Washington, D.C.
- June 1984 – January 1986, commander, 4450th Tactical Group, Nellis Air Force Base, Nevada
- January 1986 – June 1987, special assistant to the chief of staff, Supreme Headquarters Allied Powers Europe, Brussels, Belgium
- June 1987 – August 1988, commander, 14th Air Division, Strategic Air Command, Beale Air Force Base, California
- August 1988 – July 1991, assistant deputy chief of staff for plans and programs; deputy chief of staff for plans and resources; then deputy chief of staff for operations, Headquarters Strategic Air Command, Offutt Air Force Base, Nebraska
- July 1991 – August 1992, director of plans, deputy chief of staff for plans and operations, Headquarters U.S. Air Force, Washington, D.C.
- August 1992 – October 1994, commander, 7th Air Force, Pacific Air Forces; deputy commander, U.S. Forces Korea; commander, Air Component Command, Republic of Korea and U.S. Combined Forces Command; commander, U.S. Air Forces Korea; and deputy commander in chief, United Nations Command, Osan Air Base, Republic of Korea
- October 1994 – August 1996, director for operations (J-3), the Joint Staff, Washington, D.C.
- August 1996 – 1998, commander in chief, North American Aerospace Defense Command and United States Space Command, and commander, Air Force Space Command, Peterson Air Force Base, Colorado

== Flight information ==
- Rating: Command pilot
- Flight hours: More than 4,500
- Aircraft flown: A-7, F-4, F-16, F-117 and EC-135

== Awards and decorations ==
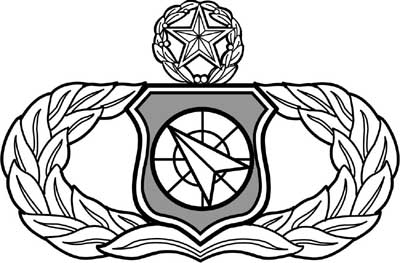
US Air Force Command Pilot Badge
Basic Maintenance & Munitions Badge
Command Space and Missile Operations Badge
Master Missile Maintenance Badge
North American Aerospace Defense Command Badge

Defense Distinguished Service Medal with two bronze oak leaf clusters
Air Force Distinguished Service Medal with oak leaf cluster
Defense Superior Service Medal
Legion of Merit
Distinguished Flying Cross with oak leaf cluster
Meritorious Service Medal with three oak leaf clusters
Air Medal with ten oak leaf clusters
Air Force Commendation Medal with two oak leaf clusters
Air Force Outstanding Unit Award with "V" device
Air Force Organizational Excellence Award
Combat Readiness Medal
National Defense Service Medal with one bronze service star
Armed Forces Expeditionary Medal
Vietnam Service Medal with three service stars
Air Force Overseas Short Tour Service Ribbon
Air Force Overseas Long Tour Service Ribbon with two oak leaf clusters
Air Force Longevity Service Award with one silver and two bronze oak leaf clusters
Small Arms Expert Marksmanship Ribbon
Air Force Training Ribbon
Order of National Security Merit (Republic of Korea), Gukseon Medal
Vietnam Gallantry Cross Unit Award
Vietnam Campaign Medal
