= History of papermaking in New York =

A paper mill in Glens Falls, New York

The History of Papermaking in New York had its beginnings in the late 18th century, at a time when linen and cotton rags were the primary source of fibers in the manufacturing process. By 1850 there were more than 106 paper mills in New York, more than in any other state. A landmark in the history of papermaking in the United States was the installation of the first Fourdrinier machine in the country at a mill in Saugerties, New York, in 1827. Papermaking from ground-wood pulp began in New York in 1869, with the establishment of the Hudson River Pulp & Paper Company in Corinth and also with the work of Illustrious Remington and his sons in Watertown. The innovation and success of the Remingtons spurred further development of the industry in the state.

== Early paper mills ==
There is documentation that the New York merchant John Keating opened a paper mill in Manhattan in 1768, although no watermarks have been attributed to that mill. In 1772 Keating moved his mill to Continental Village, in Putnam County, NY, where it operated for a few years, until it was set afire by British troops in 1777, during the American Revolution.

In 1773, the Manhattan-based printer and bookseller Hugh Gaine, in partnership with Hendrick Onderdonk and Henry Remsen, established a paper mill at Hempstead Harbor (later called Roslyn), on Long Island. Watermarks of this consortium, based on a combination of the partners' initials, appear on printings of New York state laws in 1775.

== First groundwood papermaking ==
The first mechanical invention to revolutionize paper making was the fourdrinier machine invented in 1799, in France, by Nicholas Louis Robert and perfected by Henry Fourdrinier and his brother, Sealey. The second was the Keller-Voelter grinders for turning wood into wood pulp.

In 1866, Albrecht Pagenstecher, a German immigrant living in Stockbridge, Massachusetts, together with his brother Rudolf, bought two German-made Keller-Voelter grinders. As stated by Albrecht Pagenstecher himself: on March 5, 1867, in nearby Curtisville, he was the first in the United States to manufacture commercially viable 'groundwood' wood pulp. He sold the pulp to the Smith Paper Company which on March 8, 1867 produced commercial newsprint paper. Pagenstecher made his pulp out of aspen or "popple" and soon the supply of available popple ran out. The New York World reluctantly cancelled its contract for the newsprint, which the Smith Paper Company of Lee, Massachusetts was making from this new woodpulp. In despair, Pagenstecher returned to Saxony and asked Heinrich Voelter what he could do. "We too have run out of popple," was the reply, "but we are using spruce. Have you any spruce in America?" To this Pagenstecher could only reply, "I do not know, but I'll find out."

== Early visions of wood-based papermaking in New York ==
Cornell Professor of Forest Management, and a leader and consultant to the pulp and paper industry, Arthur Bernhard Recknagel (1906 graduate of Yale forestry school; at Cornell from 1913 to 1943; forester and executive secretary of Empire State Forest Products Association from 1917 to 1948), used to tell how his uncle, Albrecht Pagenstecher returned home from Saxony and asked his friend, Senator Warren Miller, who suggested that they go to Saratoga Springs and make inquiries there for spruce. From Saratoga they drove to Luzerne, at the confluence of the Hudson and Sacandaga Rivers, and learned that spruce was abundantly available in these watersheds.

It all started for the Paine family in 1885. Several years before, Augustus G. Paine Sr. had sold the Champlain Fiber and Pulp Co., of Willsboro, New York, an evaporator to recover and reuse the expensive chemicals used in "cooking" wood chips. Like many equipment dealers, Paine not only marketed his product but financed it as well. When Champlain Fiber went out of business, Paine's note made him the owner of his very own pulp mill.

A.G.Paine Sr. summoned his bachelor son home from studies in England to run the plant. His son, Augustus G. Paine, Jr., moved to Willsboro, New York in 1885 to take over management of the local pulp mill. With his good management, the mill prospered and became part of the New York and Pennsylvania Paper Company, one of the country's leading paper manufacturers which would operate until the mid-1960s, supplying paper to Ladies' Home Journal and the Saturday Evening Post.

The J. & J. Rogers Company put Au Sable Forks on the map and employed the community for over a century. Making paper from wood pulp was its second business. Iron was its first. "The J. & J. Rogers Company was a big part of why we have an Adirondack Park," acknowledges Jim Rogers (James Rogers III), a descendant of one of the company's founders who lives in Lake Placid.

At the time, James Rogers Jr. controlled roughly 75,000 acres of timberland on which much of the hardwood had been cut for charcoal to make iron. A business opportunity occurred to him: harvest the remaining softwood, mostly spruce, for wood pulp, the new way of making paper! The paper mill was built in 1902.

== Hudson River Pulp & Paper Mills ==
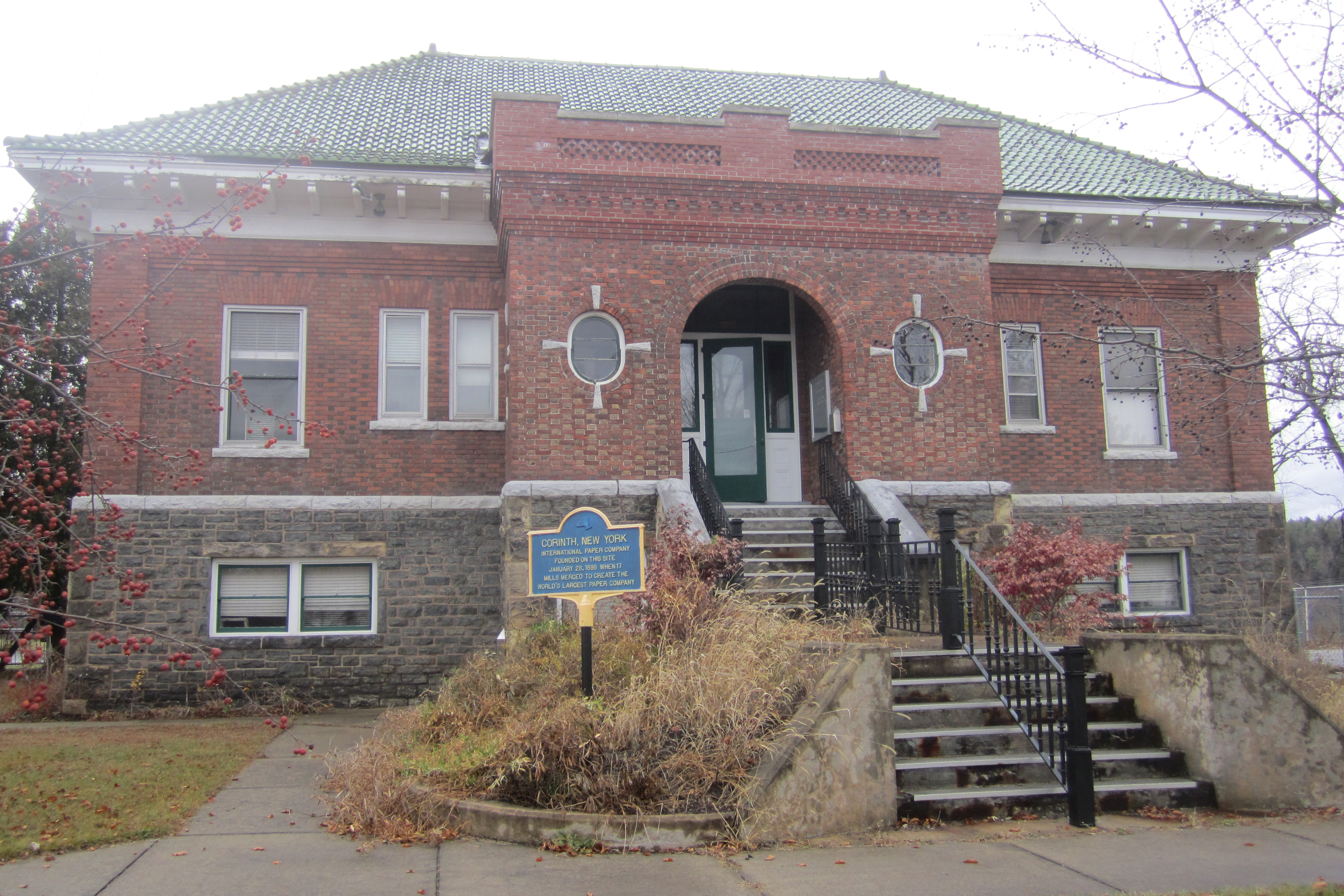
Former offices on International Paper in Corinth, New York

Albrecht Pagenstecher and his friend Senator Warren Miller's trip resulted in the Hudson River Pulp & Paper Company which started making groundwood and newsprint in 1869 at Palmer (Corinth), New York, near Luzerne.

Following its acquisition by the International Paper Company in 1898, the Hudson River facility became the firm's "flagship mill" and site of its principal office. Pagenstecher served on International Paper's Board of Directors.

After World War II, Hudson River millworkers developed and perfected the production of coated papers for International Paper. In November 2002, shifting economic forces resulted in the mill's closure; nine years later, in 2011, it was slated for demolition.

Finch Paper LLC (Finch, Pruyn Company) is an American paper manufacturing corporation, operating in Glens Falls, New York, for 150 years.

In Mechanicville, New York, Westvaco Corporation's MeadWestvaco 6 paper machines ran non-stop to feed the printing presses of the nation's leading publishers. After WWII the Westvaco plant was the largest 'book-paper' mill in the world. It closed in 1971.

In Ballston Spa, NY, George West gradually acquired nine water-powered mills on Kayaderosseras Creek by 1879 manufacturing cotton, paper, and paper bags.West was called "The Paper Bag King" because he was one of the first men in the country to manufacture paper bags at a time when most bags were made from cotton. Today Rock City Falls is largely residential, although the Cottrell Paper Company still operates much as it did one hundred years ago making electrical insulating paper.

== Wood-based papermaking in Watertown ==
Even while Pagenstecher was starting up the Hudson River mill, in 1869 Illustrious Remington and his three sons, Hiram, Alfred D. and Charles R., were making a ton of newsprint daily in Watertown, New York, using four rag machines and an 84" fourdrinier machine. By 1870, the Remingtons, seeing a future for wood pulp, built three mills on Sewall's Island in Watertown. These mills used the Voelter process allowing a low-cost, high-quality Remington newsprint to be made of 75% rags and 25% wood pulp instead of all-rag content paper costing five times more.

A third invention caught the imagination of the Remingtons. In 1867, Benjamin Tilghman, an American chemist, discovered that sulphurous acid (H_{2}SO_{3}) dissolved the lignin in wood, leaving a residue of cellulose fibers. Nought came of this discovery. However, Alfred D. Remington learned that a Swede, Carl Daniel Ekman, was teaching papermakers in Sweden to make paper entirely out of wood pulp by using a sulphite process (SO3). Remington went to Sweden to see "This Miracle" for himself. He was so impressed that he imported Swedish chemical fiber for several years and later developed the "sulphite process" in his own plant on Sewall's Island.

The Remingtons were selling newsprint to the New York Times. They received an order for ten tons stipulating that the newsprint contain no wood pulp! A. D. Remington, proud of his new product, sent it to the Times along with a note, asking them to try it. The reply was, "come and get your paper", which he did. It wasn't long before the Times was eager and willing to buy this new and cheaper newsprint.

The revolution in paper-making in the Black River region was complete: fourdrinier machines became bigger and bigger and faster and faster; the demand for spruce was insatiable and the lumbermen practically denuded the virgin forests; the unpleasant odor of the sulphite mills replaced the equally unpleasant odor of the tanneries. Other paper-makers, emulating the success of the Remingtons embarked on a costly program of mass-production of wood pulp newsprint.

== Gould Paper Company ==
G. Henry P. Gould was the founder of the Gould Paper Company in Lyons Falls, New York.

In 1956 the Lyons Falls Paper Corporation took over operations. They put in a hardwood pulping plant. They were the first paper maker in the United States to use this type of process.

== See also ==
- History of paper
- History of papermaking in Massachusetts
