= Charles Fenerty =

Canadian inventor and poet (1821–1892)

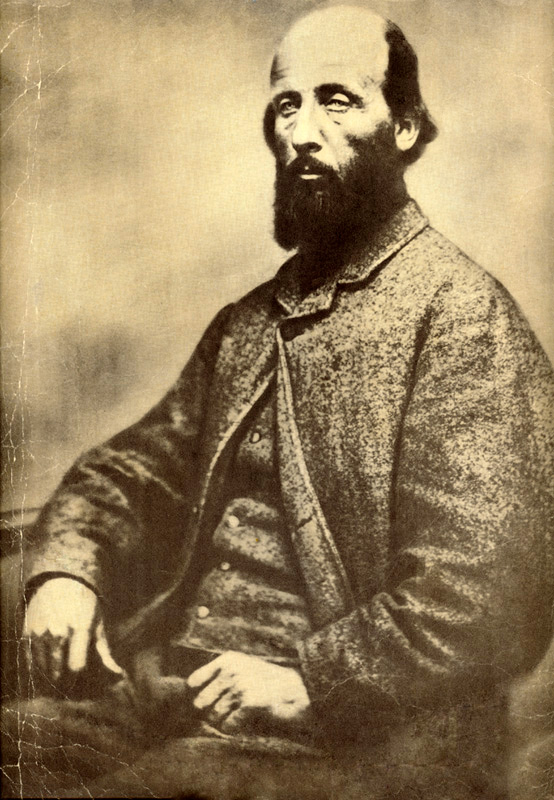
- Fenerty, c. 1870
- Born: c. January 1821; Upper Falmouth, Colony of Nova Scotia, British Empire
- Died: 10 June 1892; Lower Sackville, Nova Scotia, Canada
- Occupations: Farmer, writer (journalist articles), lumberman, lumber mill worker, sackville church board, wood measurer, census taker, health warden
- Known for: The invention of wood pulp for the production of paper
- Spouse: Anne Hamilton
- Children: None
- Awards: Winner of the Nova Scotia Industrial Exhibition "Poetry Contest". The title of the poem: Betula Nigra. He also awarded for making "The Best Wood Laths in Nova Scotia".
- Website: http://www.charlesfenerty.ca http://www.charlesfenerty.com

Charles Fenerty (c. January 1821 – 10 June 1892) was a Canadian inventor who invented the wood pulp process for papermaking, which was first adapted into the production of newsprint. Fenerty was also a poet, writing over 32 known poems.

== Early life ==
Fenerty was born in Upper Falmouth, Nova Scotia. He was the youngest of three boys, all of whom worked for their father, a lumberman and farmer. During the winter months, the Fenertys would clear-cut the local forests for lumber, which they then transported to the family's lumber mill at Springfield Lake. The Fenertys shipped their lumber to the Halifax dockyards, where it was exported or used locally. The Fenertys had around 1,000 acres (4.0 km^{2}) of farmland; they shipped most of their produce to the markets in Halifax.

As a young man, Fenerty began writing poetry; his first (known) poem, written when he was 17 years old, was titled "The Prince's Lodge" (later retitled as "Passing Away" and published in 1888). It described an abandoned, decaying home overlooking the Bedford Basin near Halifax. The lodge had been built decades prior by Prince Edward, Duke of Kent and Strathearn, who later returned to England.

== Invention of paper from wood pulp ==
Each time Fenerty hauled lumber and produce to Halifax, he would pass the local paper mills, and sometimes stopped by to watch the process, since there were many similarities between lumber and paper mills. In those days paper was made from pulped rags, cotton and other plant fibres, a technique used for nearly 2000 years (see History of paper). Demand for paper was outstripping the supply of rags, and Europe started cutting down their shipments of cotton to North America.

Fenerty had learned that trees have fibres too, through discussions with the naturalist Titus Smith. At the age of 17 (in c.1838) he began his experiments of making paper from wood. By 1844, he had perfected the process (including bleaching the pulp to a white colour). In a letter written by a family member circa 1915 it is mentioned that Charles Fenerty had shown a crude sample of his paper to a friend named Charles Hamilton in 1840 (a relative of his future wife), though the family member in question would have been around 8 at the time. On 26 October 1844 Charles Fenerty took a sample of his paper to Halifax's top newspaper, the Acadian Recorder, where he had written a letter on his newly invented paper saying:

Messrs. English & Blackadar,

Enclosed is a small piece of PAPER, the result of an experiment I have made, in order to ascertain if that useful article might not be manufactured from WOOD. The result has proved that opinion to be correct, for- by the sample which I have sent you, Gentlemen- you will perceive the feasibility of it. The enclosed, which is as firm in its texture as white, and to all appearance as durable as the common wrapping paper made from hemp, cotton, or the ordinary materials of manufacture is ACTUALLY COMPOSED OF SPRUCE WOOD, reduced to a pulp, and subjected to the same treatment as paper is in course of being made, only with this exception, VIZ: my insufficient means of giving it the required pressure. I entertain an opinion that our common forest trees, either hard or soft wood, but more especially the fir, spruce, or poplar, on account of the fibrous quality of their wood, might easily be reduced by a chafing machine, and manufactured into paper of the finest kind. This opinion, Sirs, I think the experiment will justify, and leaving it to be prosecuted further by the scientific, or the curious.

I remain, Gentlemen, your obdt. servant,

CHARLES FENERTY.

The Acadian Recorder
Halifax, N.S.

Saturday, October 26, 1844

Other inventors had used wood to make paper; in the 18th century a French scientist by the name of René Antoine Ferchault de Réaumur suggested that paper could be made from trees. His theory caught the interest of Matthias Koops, who in 1800 experimented with papermaking by compressing and adhering straw and wood shavings.

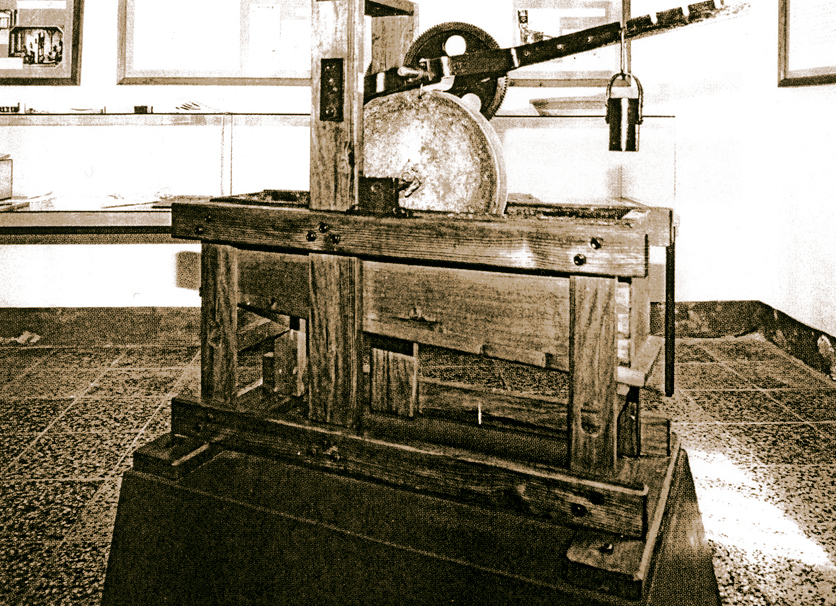
The F. G. Keller wood-grinding machine c.1854.

In about 1838 German weaver Friedrich Gottlob Keller read Réaumur's report. Unaware of Fenerty across the ocean, he experimented for a few years and, in 1845, a year after Fenerty's letter to the newspaper, filed for a patent in Germany for the ground wood pulp process for making modern paper. In that same year Heinrich Voelter bought the patent for about five hundred dollars and started making paper. His venture wasn't financially successful, and Keller later was unable to afford to renew his patent. Voelter has been credited in Germany as the first to make paper from wood pulp.

== Poetry and travel ==
Fenerty was also a well-known poet of his time, publishing more than 35 (known) poems. Some of the better known titles were: "Betula Nigra" (about a Black Birch tree), "Essay on Progress" (published in 1866), and "The Prince's Lodge" (about Prince Edward Augustus, Duke of Kent and Strathearn, written around 1838 and published in 1888). In October 1854, he won first prize for "Betula Nigra" at the Nova Scotia Industrial Exhibition.

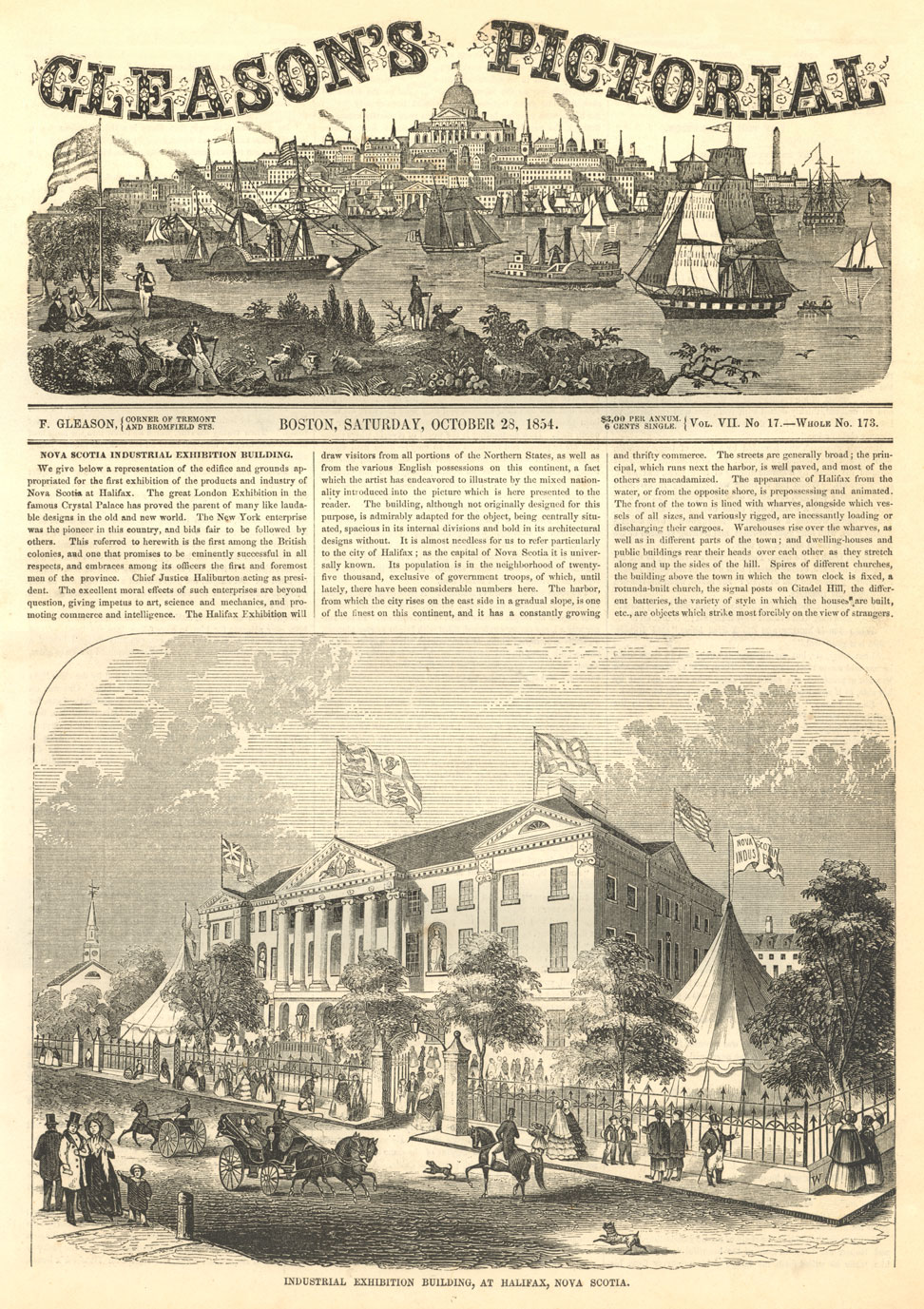
Nova Scotia Industrial Exhibition of 1854

Fenerty did extensive travelling throughout Australia between the years 1858 to 1865, living through the Australian gold rushes, and then returned to Halifax. He became involved with the Church and held several positions in Halifax: Wood Measurer, Census Taker, Health Warden, Tax Collector for his community, and Overseer of the Poor.

Charles Fenerty Monument

== Death and legacy ==
Little attention was given to Fenerty's invention, and he himself never developed his process or took out a patent on it. It did mark the beginning to a new industry; today most people attribute F. G. Keller as the original inventor.

Pulped wood paper slowly began to be adopted by paper mills. German newspapers were the first to adopt the new paper, then other newspapers made the switch from rags to wood pulp. Soon there were mills throughout Canada, the U.S., and Europe, and later the rest of the world. A wood pulp paper mill was erected near Fenerty's home town. By the end of the 19th century almost all newspapers in the western world were using pulp wood newsprint.

Fenerty died on 10 June 1892 in his home in Lower Sackville, Nova Scotia, from a flu.

Passing Away (aka, The Prince's Lodge), c.1838, by Charles Fenerty (which appeared in the Rockingham Sentinel (Halifax, NS), March 1888).

== Poems by Charles Fenerty ==
- The Prince's Lodge (His first known poem, written in c.1837)
- Betula Nigra (His award-winning poem)
- Battle of the Alma
- In Memoriam of James Montgomery
- The Relic
- Hid Treasure: Canto I
- Hid Treasure: Canto II
- Hid Treasure: Canto III
- To a Rich Miser
- The Saxon's Sentimental Journey
- The Tao-Aspiring Poet
- A Lilt of Skibbereen
- Reason and Faith
- Hymn
- The Man of God
- Farewell to Australia (1865)
- The Voyagers on Gennesaret
- Keep the Heart Young
- Essay on Progress
- The Decline of Spain
- Lex Talionis
- The Blind Lady's Request
- Early Piety
- Terra Nova
- To a Meteorite
- The Sentinel Rose
- In Memoriam
- The Wreck of the Atlantic
- Sir Provo Wallis (His last known poem, written in 1892)
- Passing On
- Eighteen Hundred and Two
- Howe

== Recognition ==
On Canada Day in 1987, Canada Post featured Fenerty on one of a set of four stamps commemorating Canadian inventors in Communications.

== Bibliography ==
- Burger, Peter. Charles Fenerty and his Paper Invention. Toronto: Peter Burger, 2007. ISBN 978-0-9783318-1-8
- Carruthers, George. Paper in the Making. Toronto: The Garden City Press Co-Operative, 1947.
- Crowley, David, Paul Heyer. Communication in History: Technology, Culture, Society, 5th ed. Boston: Pearson Allyn & Bacon, 2007.
- Dictionary of Canadian Biography. Vol. I – XII. Toronto: University of Toronto Press, 1990.
- Encyclopedia Canadiana. 10 vols. Toronto: Grolier of Canada Ltd., 1977.
- Fenerty, Charles. Betula Nigra. Halifax: W. Cunnabell, 1855.
- Fenerty, Charles. Essay on Progress. Halifax: James Bowes & Sons, 1866.
- Fenerty, Charles. (Manuscript) "Hid Treasure" or the Labours of a Deacon–and other poems. Halifax: MS Pp 81, n/p, n/d (ca.1888). (Dalhousie University call Number: MS-2-158)
- Fergusson, Dr. Charles Bruce. Charles Fenerty: The Life and Achievement of a Native of Sackville, Halifax County, N.S. Halifax: William Macnab & Son, 1955.
- Halifax Herald, The, Halifax, Nova Scotia, 1840–1892.
- Harvey, Robert Paton. Historic Sackville. Halifax: Nimbus Publishing Ltd, 2002.
- Hunter, Dard. Papermaking: The History and Technique of an Ancient Craft. New York: Dover Publications, Inc. 1978.
- Knott, Leonard L. The Children's Book about Pulp and Paper. Montreal: Editorial Associates, 1949.
- Koops, Matthias. Historical account of the substances which have been used to describe events, and to convey ideas, from the earliest date, to the invention of paper. London: Printed by T. Burton, 1800.
- MacBeath, George. Great Maritime Achievers in Science and Technology. Fredericton, NB: Goose Lane Editions, 2005.
- MacFarlane, William Godsoe. "Fenerty, Charles". New Brunswick Bibliography: The Books and Writers of the Province. St. John, N.B., 1895: 30. (Available at the University of Toronto, CIHM no.: 09418).
- Marble, Allen Everett. Nova Scotians at Home and Abroad. Windsor, NS: Lancelot Press Ltd, 1986.
- Morgan, Henry J. "Fenerty, Charles". Bibliotheca Canadensis. Ottawa: G.E. Desbarats. 1867.
- Mullane, George. Footprints Around and About Bedford Basin. Halifax: (Reprints from the Acadian Recorder), n/p, ca.1914. (CIHM no. 78665 U of T) ISBN 0-665-78665-4
- NovaScotian, The, Halifax, Nova Scotia, 1830–1880.
- Pönicke, Herbert. "Keller, Friedrich Gottlob". Neue Deutsche Biographie. Berlin: Duncker & Humblot, 1977.
- Punch, Terrence Michael. Some Native Sons of Erin in Nova Scotia. Halifax: Petheric Press, 1980.
- Punch, Terrence M. "Fenerty, Charles". Dictionary of Canadian Biography. (Vol. XII. 1891 to 1900). Toronto: University of Toronto Press, 1990: 311.
- Punch, Terrence M. Nova Scotia Vital Statistics from Newspaper, 1818–1822. Halifax: Genealogical Association of the Royal Nova Scotia Historical Society, Publication No. 1, 1978.
- Raddall, Thomas H. Halifax – Warden of the North. Toronto: McClelland and Stewart Ltd, 1977.
- Schlieder, Wolfgang. Der Erfinder des Holzschliffs Friedrich Gottlob Keller. Leipzig, Germany: VEB Fachbuchverlag Leipzig, 1977.
- Sittauer, Hans L. Friedrich Gottlob Keller. Leipzig: BSB B.G. Teubner Verlagsgesellschaft, 1982.
- Tennant, Robert D. Jr. Millview: From Winter Cove to Salt Hill. Nova Scotia: n/p, n/d, (held at the Fultz Museum, Sackville, NS).
- Walther Killy and Rudolf Vierhaus. "Keller, Friedrich Gottlob". Deutsche Biographische Enzyklopädie. Munich: Die Deutsche Bibliothek, 1997.
- Watters, Reginald Eyre. A Check List of Canadian Literature and Background Materials: 1628–1950. Toronto: University of Toronto Press, 1959.

== See also ==
- Acadia Paper Mill
- René Antoine Ferchault de Réaumur
- Fiber crop
- Invention in Canada
- List of Canadian poets
- List of Canadian writers
- List of people on stamps of Canada
- Paper engineering
- Pulpwood
- Technological and industrial history of Canada
- The Greatest Canadian Invention
- Timeline of historic inventions
