= History of papermaking in Massachusetts =

External videos
- Manufacture of Writing Paper at an unknown Holyoke mill of the American Writing Paper Company, Fox Movietone News (1919)

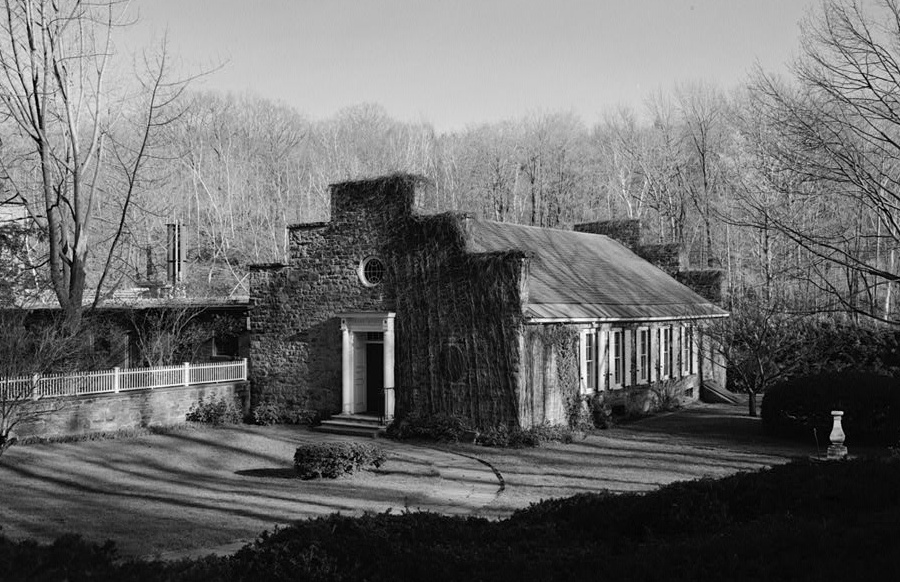
Crane and Company Old Stone Mill Rag Room (built c. 1844), Dalton, Massachusetts

This article addresses the history of papermaking in Massachusetts.

== 1620–1800 ==
Early paper in Massachusetts was, as was common in Europe, made from cotton and linen rags. As the 18th century progressed, the demand for printed books was increasingly met by local printers, so the demand for paper increased and rags became scarce. One paper manufacturer in Massachusetts even issued paper with a "Save Rags' watermark. The shortage was so extreme during the American Revolution, that the Committees of Safety in Massachusetts were required to appoint a rag collector in each jurisdiction.

== Early mills ==
In 1801, Zenas Crane began making paper in Dalton, Massachusetts, which later became Crane & Company. In 1857 Crane & Company began making the paper for banknotes, and it was confirmed as the paper of choice for U.S. currency beginning in 1862. As of 2012, Crane & Company continues to manufacture the paper for U.S. currency. By 1840 Lee was the largest paper producer, and by Zenas Crane's death in 1845, Berkshire was the largest paper producing county in the United States.

The "Turkey" mill in Tyringham was built by Milton Ingersol in 1833 to produce paper from rags. In 1835 it became the firm of Platner and Smith, which in 1850 purchased the Union and Enterprise mills on the Housatonic River in Lee, Massachusetts, and another mill on the Laurel Lake outlet. These three mills were called the Castle and Laurel paper mills. Platner and Smith became the largest paper manufacture in the United States. Subsequently, the firm was incorporated as the Smith Paper Company.

Municipalities and villages with paper mills in Massachusetts by the year 1938

In 1849, the Holyoke Dam was completed across the Connecticut River which started an expansion of mills, and especially paper mills throughout Massachusetts. The first of these mills, met with some resistance by the dam's investors at that time, was the Parsons Paper Company. In the subsequent decades the growth of the paper industry across Massachusetts was described as thus-

For a time it seemed that paper mills sprung up like mushrooms, all up and down the streams in Lee, Tyringham, Stockbridge, Housatonic, Great Barrington, and there were times when men, seemingly bemused by the lure of this industry, erected little "one family" mills on their farms and went headlong into the business, knowing little or nothing about it and prospering little or none.

== Wood pulp ==
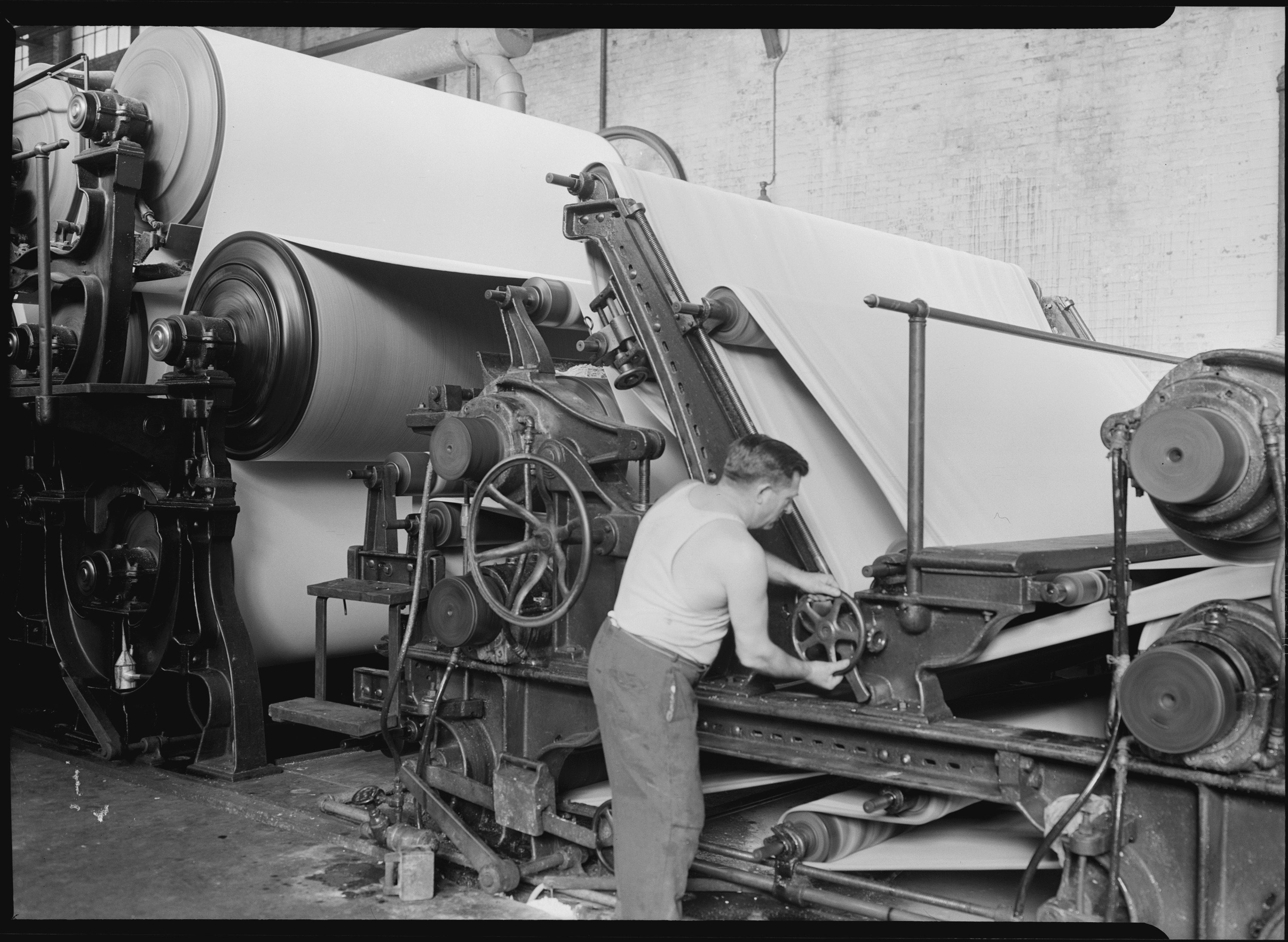
Making matchboard at the American Writing Paper Company, Mt. Holyoke, MA (c. 1940)

In 1857, the firm of Platner and Smith made paper from wood pulp, but their endeavor failed to be commercially viable because of the lengthy process used to reduce the wood to pulp and the high cost. The paper they produced was quite coarse and did not take print well.

In 1866, Albrecht Pagenstecher, a German immigrant living in Stockbridge, Massachusetts, together with his brother Rudolf, bought two German-made Keller-Voelter grinders. On March 5, 1867, in nearby Curtisville, Pagenstecher was the first in the United States to manufacture commercially viable wood pulp. He sold the pulp to the Smith Paper Company which immediately produced commercial newsprint. However, Pagenstecher initially made his pulp out of aspen or "popple"; however, he soon exhausted his supply of this tree and was forced to substitute with less friable softwoods, with the result that the New York World cancelled its contract for newsprint.

Many of the Holyoke mills quickly converted to wood pulp, and Holyoke with twelve major paper mills became the world's largest center for papermaking. Additionally the city was home to D. H. & A. B. Tower, who specialized in mills operating using the sulfite process; at one time their firm was reportedly the largest in the United States. Because of its prominence in industrial papermaking, Holyoke's machinery and labor practices would be the subject of extensive study by officials and industrialists of Japan and China alike, who sought to modernize their production methods.

== Decline ==
As local labor costs rose and wood became scarcer in Massachusetts, papermaking declined due in no small part to competition first from mills in well-forested Wisconsin and then from Canada. Starting after World War I, paper mills in Massachusetts began to close. The industry survived by focusing on the manufacture of specialty papers, such as writing bond, which prospered until the 1970s.

== See also ==
- History of paper
- History of papermaking in New York
