= Silk paper =

Silk paper may refer to:

- Postage stamp silk paper
- Samarkand paper, also known as silk paper
- Silk fiber paper, a paper-like material produced from mechanically processed silk fibers
