= Voith =

German industrial manufacturer

Voith GmbH & Co. KGaA
- Type: GmbH & Co. KGaA (100% family-owned limited-liability commandite)
- Industry: Mechanical engineering
- Predecessor: Otto Dörries AG, vorm. Maschinenfabrik Banning und Seybold
- Founded: 1867
- Headquarters: Heidenheim an der Brenz, Germany
- Key people: Dirk Hoke (CEO as of April 2025); Siegfried Russwurm, chairman of the Supervisory Board and Shareholders' Committee
- Revenue: 4.8 bn euros
- Number of employees: ~20,000
- Website: voith.com/corp-en/index.html

The Voith Group (German pronunciation: [fɔʏt]) is a global technology company. With its broad portfolio of systems, products, services and digital applications, Voith trades in the markets of energy, paper, raw materials and transport. Founded in 1867, Voith today has around 22,000 employees, sales of € 5.2 billion and locations in over 60 countries worldwide and thus is one of the larger family-owned companies in Europe.

== Company history ==
=== Years of foundation ===
In 1825, Johann Matthäus Voith took over his father's locksmith's workshop in Heidenheim with five employees, mainly carrying out repairs to water wheels and paper mills.

By around 1830 in Heidenheim, there were about 600 people working in 15 factories, mostly textile factories that had been established by wealthy merchants and publishers. The necessary maintenance and repair of the expensive machinery offered a source of income to several workshops, particularly the locksmiths and metalworkers in what was still a small town at the time. In 1830, Johann Matthäus Voith and his workshop were involved in the construction of a paper machine developed by Johann Jakob Widmann from Heilbronn.

Voith developed the first wood grinders based on the patented design of Friedrich Gottlob Keller. In doing so, he laid the cornerstone for the industrial enterprise Voith. As the company got bigger, so too did the private wealth of its owners. According to town council records dated September 28, 1849, the assets of Johann Matthäus Voith in 1849 amounted to more than 7,000 fl., and eight years later grew to an estimated 15,000 fl. In 1850, Johann Matthäus Voith was summoned to serve on the town council and, in 1855, along with nine other Heidenheim entrepreneurs, he received a grant to attend the international exhibition in Paris.

No. of employees
Year	No. of employees
1825	5
1853	7
1867	approx. 35

After 1850, the company which, like other Heidenheim-based metal workshops, had specialized in repairs, began to replicate various machines imported from England. The workshop produced whatever the customers ordered. The transition from a small metalworking shop to a machine factory was completed when contracts were signed for the fabrication of machines for paper manufacturer Heinrich Voelter. Since 1856, these machines had consisted of mechanical wood grinders (based on a patent originally sold in 1846 by Friedrich Gottlob Keller to Voelter's father that Friedrich Voith improved upon and re-registered himself in 1868). From 1861, the machines were wood pulp refiners for crushing coarse wood chips. The result of this development was that the company started to specialize in machines for paper and pulp production. In 1863, a new metalworking shop was added and fitted with one of the few steam engines in Heidenheim. Until the development of cast steel, the machines were built from cast iron. It was difficult to transport cast iron, so the company built its own foundry. No figures have been preserved on the company's sales and profits at the time, but the physical expansion of the company is taken as proof of its good economic performance. In 1863, Friedrich Voith bought a share in a bark mill, where he set up the first research center for the production of wood pulp.

After Voelter's paper mill was destroyed by a fire in 1864, Voith received its first major order for the fabrication of eight hollander beaters, which required building another machine hall. The company's name was changed from Mechanicus Voith to Mechanische Werkstätte und Eisengießerei (Mechanical Workshops and Foundry).

=== Rise to the industrial enterprise ===
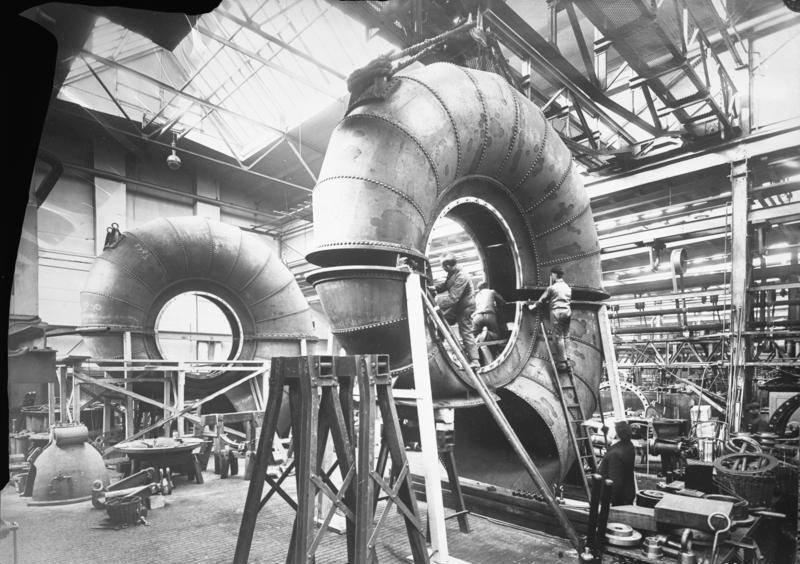
Assembly of huge spiral turbines by Voith for an output of 3677 kW, for the Nore power plant in Norway, in November 1928

The official founding date of the company J. M. Voith is January 1, 1867. At this point, the company employed around 35 people. On January 1, 1867, the only son of 63-year-old Johann Matthäus Voith, the 26-year-old Friedrich Voith, took over the business as the sole owner. Under his leadership, his father's workshop became a larger company and specialized in paper machines and the construction of water wheels and turbines. In 1869, Voith was granted the first patent for a wood grinder with a toothed loading rack. On November 18, 1869, the company applied for official registration in the Commercial Register and changed its name to Maschinenfabrik und Eisengießerei von J. M. Voith in Heidenheim.

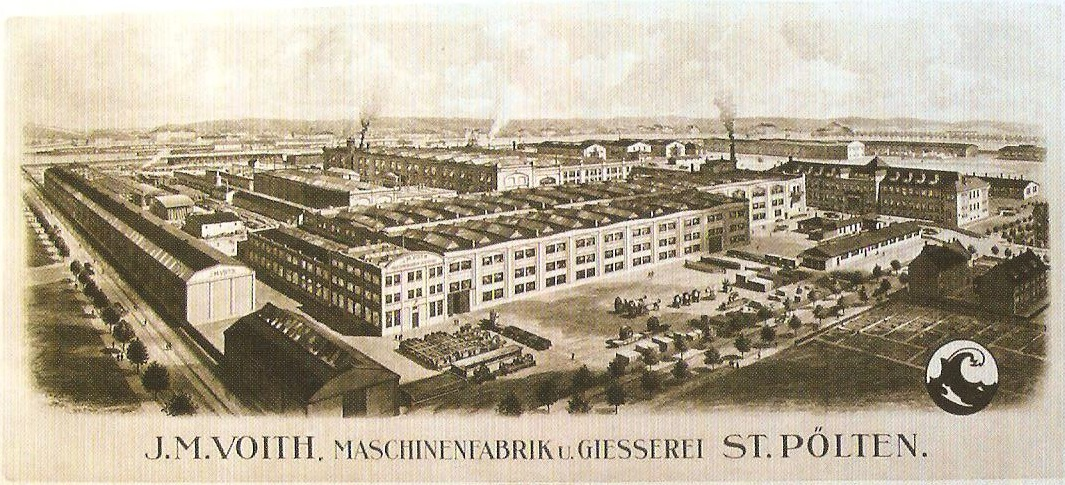
The first subsidiary, Maschinenfabrik J. M. Voith, built in 1904 in St. Pölten, Austria, c. 1910

In 1871, the eight-year-old foundry was expanded. At that time, it had an annual production of 240 tons and employed an average of 19 workers, putting it roughly in the middle of all the foundries in Württemberg. By 1880, it was producing 380 tons with 34 workers on average; in 1890, 1,401 tons with 106 workers; and in 1900, 3,098 tons with 220 workers. At the turn of the century, the foundry had climbed from the mid-field to become the second largest foundry in Württemberg.

Voith added another business segment to its existing product lines of paper machines and stock preparation technology – with the construction of a 100-HP Henschel-Jonval turbine. The sources available provide differing information on the relevant figures. The reason for this new turbine production segment was likely because the Heidenheim businesses were suffering from a lack of motive power due to the low supplies of iron ore and coal in the Württemberg region, and that well into the 19th century their largest energy source was hydropower from the River Brenz. During his studies, Friedrich Voith had examined producing hydropower energy. From 1873, the company was selling improved Francis turbines to industrial companies in Heidenheim in collaboration with Wilhelm von Kankelwitz (1831–1892), Professor of Mechanical Engineering at what was then the Stuttgart Polytechnikum (Institute of Technology).

At the 1873 World Exhibition in Vienna, Friedrich Voith and Heinrich Voelter exhibited the Voith wood grinder and received the "Progress Medal" for their development. In 1879 the first automatic speed regulator for turbines was built based on the designs of Voith engineer Adolf Pfarr. The first turbines were originally intended for the mechanical drive systems of machines. As electrification increased, water turbines served to produce electricity.

In 1881, Voith fabricated the first complete Voith paper machine PM1, with a wire width of 2.35 m, for Raithelhuber, Bezner & Cie. in Gemmrigheim. The first administration building was built in 1886. This was followed by a staff canteen in 1887 and another large assembly hall in 1889 that enlarged the factory grounds from 5,090 m^{2} to 9,590 m^{2}. In 1896, a new machine hall was established for turbine construction. This was the first building to be located on the right bank of the River Brenz.

In 1890, Voith began to supply high-pressure Pelton turbines (also known as impulse-type turbines). In the same year, Friedrich Voith was appointed by Karl I., the King of Württemberg, to his Council of Commercial Advisor. In 1892, Wilhem II., the last King of Württemberg, visited the private home of Friedrich Voith. At the time, Voith's mechanical engineering factory was the second largest company in Heidenheim. The king visited a total of four companies in Heidenheim. In 1892, the company had a workforce of 330 people, making it one of the largest companies in the Kingdom of Württemberg.

In other centers of industrialization during this period, there were numerous social conflicts between companies and workers. Historians have proposed several reasons to explain why this was not the case among the large Heidenheim companies, including the traditionally close reciprocal relationships between commerce and farming and the fact that Heidenheim was still a small town. It is assumed that the large proportion of women and children working in the textile industry could also have been a factor to explain why social democracy and trade unions were slow to become established in Heidenheim. The workers did begin to organize themselves, and in 1890, an office of the German Metal Workers Union was opened and a local branch of the SPD (Social Democratic Party) established. For 1904, the number of union members was estimated at 80 to 100. In the same year, a trade union "commission" was established to link the various trade unions that had been created for printers, woodworkers, construction workers and factory workers.

Starting in 1893, J. M. Voith began building Pelton turbines. For Friedrich Voith, the fabrication of the impulse-type turbines was further progress from both an economic and technical perspective. He regarded contact with the research and development community as essential. In 1903, Voith received an order to build the largest turbines in the world: 12 Francis turbines each with 12,000 HP for power plants at Niagara Falls in the US and Canada. The turbine segment at Voith expanded as more electric power plants were built.

In 1904, the 50th paper machine left the Heidenheim plant. By 1913, 150 had been delivered. Another successful product was the vibrating screen, which separated the coarse shavings produced by the grinding machine. This was replaced in 1902 by a new centrifugal process.

The year 1904 saw the opening of the company's first subsidiary in Sankt Pölten (Voith Austria Holding), which was managed until 1944 by Walther Voith. In 1906 , the factory grounds were linked to the Heidenheim station by an industrial railway.

Friedrich's eldest son had been managing the factory in Austria since 1904, and the second-eldest, Hermann, joined the management in 1906. The practical knowledge that had been applied so far was now increasingly being displaced by theoretical knowledge acquired through scientific education. For example, in 1907, Voith built a research and testing center for turbines in Hermaringen and another in Brunnenmühle in 1908. In the same year, the first hydraulic R&D center, Brunnenmühle in Heidenheim, started operating. Alongside the R&D center, Voith built Germany's first pumped storage hydropower plant. The elevated reservoir for the plant was located on top of the Schlossberg in Heidenheim and had a capacity of 8,000 m^{3}. The turbine tests were carried out just 100 m below in the Brunnenmühle (water mill) in the Brenz valley.

The increase in the number of Voith employees is a major reason why by 1908 there were already 800 trade union members in Heidenheim. Formerly there was said to be a good relationship between workers and factory owners in Heidenheim. This changed following the establishment of the German Metal Workers Union. That the conflicts at Voith began to accumulate before World War I is held to have been due to the management practices of the company rather than – as often claimed – because of the metalworkers' union official Sebastian Geiger.

In 1910, a building was constructed to accommodate a modelmaking hall and a fettling shop, and in 1911, a new foundry was built. That same year, Voith built at its plant in St. Pölten in Austria what was at the time the fastest and widest paper machine for newsprint paper. In 1912, Friedrich converted the company to a general partnership and transferred most of his shares to his two sons. Walther managed the St. Pölten plant, Hermann took charge of the commercial side of the Heidenheim headquarters, and Hanns was responsible for the technical department.

Friedrich Voith died in 1913 and just a month later, his third son Hanns was also included in the management team. In 1913 , the company employed more than 3,000 people in Heidenheim and St. Pölten. In the same year, Voith built what at that time was the largest paper machine for newsprint, with a wire width of 5.2 m, for Holmen Bruks in Hallstavik, Sweden.

The papers from the estate of Friedrich Voith include the financial statement at the end of the fiscal year 1912/1913. On July 1, 1913, the total assets of J. M. Voith in Heidenheim were around 15.9 million marks, and those of J. M. Voith in St.. Pölten around 4.4. million kronen or 3.8. million marks. The liabilities from loans were around 7.2. million marks in Heidenheim and around 2.4. million marks in St. Pölten. The deposits of the general and silent partners in Heidenheim combined totaled 7.3. million marks. As the company got bigger and bigger, so too did the private wealth of its owners. According to municipal council records dated September 28, 1849, the assets of Johann Matthäus Voith in 1849 amounted to more than 7,000 florins, and eight years later this was already estimated to be 15,000 florins. In 1909, in his capacity as a natural person, Friedrich Voith declared a private income of 913,405 marks and paid 5% of this in taxes, namely 45,670 marks.

=== Interwar years ===
After World War I the brothers decided on a strategic expansion of the company and got the drive technology segment operating. In 1922 , Voith started building gear transmissions where its long-standing expertise in fluid dynamics acquired in previous turbine projects provided an advantage. The breakthrough came with the help of Hermann Föttinger and his research into hydrodynamic energy transfers. In the same year, the first Kaplan turbine, named after its inventor Viktor Kaplan, left the Voith factory.

In 1927, the Viennese engineer Ernst Schneider and the Voith company in Sankt Pölten applied jointly for a patent for the Voith Schneider propeller, which had been developed the year before based on the former's plans. This marine propulsion system, which also acts as a steering device, allows maneuverability previously impossible. Schneider's design was further developed and improved at Voith.

In 1929, Voith developed the first hydrodynamic couplings based on the Föttinger principle. These were used Koepchenwerk, a pumped storage hydropower plant in Herdecke. This was followed by new drive systems for rolling stock and road vehicles. The company also made a name for itself with hydrodynamic transmissions and couplings for industrial applications.

By 1934, Voith had delivered 11,525 turbines for hydropower and pumped storage plants with a total capacity of 7.9 million HP.

Following the successful sea trials of the experimental vessel "Torqueo," which was equipped with a Voith Schneider Propeller for the first time, Voith Schneider Propellers were first used in Italy in 1937 for passenger transport in the narrow canals of Venice. At the World Fair in Paris in 1937, Voith won the "Grand Prix" three times for its exhibits of Voith Schneider Propellers and Voith turbo gear units. A year later in Paris, two fireboats fitted with VSPs went into operation on the Seine.

World War II began in 1939 and deprived Voith of the basis for its business. The export business halted. Total output was drastically reduced. The construction of paper machines in particular was decimated. 600 of the company's 4,000 employee died or went missing during the war.

Following the death of Hermann Voith, Hanns Voith assumed the overall management of the Voith factory in Heidenheim in 1942. On April 24, 1945, the U.S. army occupied Heidenheim and issued an ultimatum that the town needed to be surrendered within an hour. As the deputy mayor could not be found, Hanns Voith personally arranged the peaceful handover of the town to American troops.

=== Reconstruction and internationalization ===
After World War II, Hanns Voith and Hugo Rupf made the company thrive again. The delivery of a Voith turbine to Norway in 1947 was the first overseas order from the post-war period in Baden-Württemberg. Other major orders included the supply of eight Voith Schneider Propellers for the United Africa Co. in 1949, 46 Voith turbo gear units for Brazil and a paper machine for the Netherlands in 1951. The first Voith water tractor, known as "Biene" (bee), was also launched in 1951.

Its triple-converter transmissions for long-distance railcars and DIWA bus transmissions put Voith at the forefront of technical development in 1952. In 1953, the development and construction of paper machines reached new heights, when Voith built the fastest paper machine in Europe for the production of newsprint for Feldmühle AG. With a speed of 600 m/min, it achieved a production capacity of 200 tons per day.

In 1956, Voith opened a branch factory in Crailsheim, where it produced fluid couplings. In the same year, it exported the first turbo gear units to the United States. In 1957, Hugo Rupf became a managing director alongside Hanns Voith. He was the first manager of the company not a member of the Voith family. At the 1958 World Fair in Brussels, Voith was awarded a gold medal for the first turbo gear units for diesel-hydraulic locomotive drive systems built for Deutsche Bundesbahn (German Railways).

In the 1960s, Voith became an internationally operating group and became a pioneer in paper recycling. The company worked with the Palm and Haindl paper mills to develop a new flotation deinking process to produce paper stock from recovered paper. In 1961, Voith supplied what was at that time Europe's largest newsprint paper machine with a wire width of 8.3 m to the Ahlström publishing house in Warkaus, Finland. Meanwhile, the first Voith variable speed fluid coupling was produced in Crailsheim.

In 1962, the company supplied two spiral turbines, four storage pumps and two pump turbines for what was then the largest European pumped storage power plant in Vianden. To expand the drive technology segment, an increase in production capacities was necessary. In 1963, the company's plant in Garching near Munich began producing automatic transmissions for buses. in 1964 , Voith established a subsidiary in São Paulo in Brazil.

Between 1962 and 1966, the company acquired stakes in the Indian company Utkal Machinery and in Talleres de Tolosa in Spain, took over the tooling and paper machine manufacturer Dörries, and established sales offices in UK and France. In 1966, Voith delivered the widest newsprint paper machine in the world to a customer in Sweden. This was followed by an order from the US for two of the world's largest Pelton (impulse-type) turbines with a capacity of 226,000 HP. Equally powerful were the four Francis turbines that Voith supplied to Estreito in Brazil.

In the 1970s, Voith developed the Zentrimatic clutch and the Voith retarder for buses and trucks. In 1974, Voith established a company in Appleton, Wisconsin and in the same year acquired a majority stake in Morden Machines in Portland, Oregon. Two years later, Voith founded its first subsidiary in Japan. After the death of Hanns Voith, Hugo Rupf became chairman of the management board in 1971, and from 1973, he led the company as Chairman of the Supervisory.

=== Acquisitions and joint ventures ===
Voith entered the paper machine clothing market with its acquisition of Appleton Mills in 1983. In addition, in 1986 Voith took over the hydro operations of U.S. market leader Allis-Chalmers in York, Pennsylvania. Within just a few years, the number of employees in the USA rose from just under 200 to over 1,300. In 1985, Voith opened a production facility in Hyderabad, India.

In the early 1990s, different views among the family led to the splitting of the company's assets. The Hermann Voith side of the family withdrew, receiving a large proportion of the financial investments and the machine tool part of the business, The heirs of Hanns Voith retained the core business in paper machines, clothing, drive technology, turbines and maritime technology. This splitting of assets eliminated the debilitating stalemate in the Shareholders' Committee.

At Voith, the focus shifted to expansion in the Far East, especially in China. In 1994, Voith supplied turbines for the world's largest pumped storage hydropower plant Guangzhou II. Two years later, Voith supplied the largest fine paper machine in the world to Gold East Paper in Dagang District. New production facilities were opened in Kunshan and Liaoyang in 1996. Under the leadership of Michael Rogowski, who became spokesman for the management board in 1986, the principle of control from corporate headquarters was replaced by a management holding structure with independent corporate divisions.

Other milestones were the introduction of the R 115 integration retarder in 1988 and the commissioning of Europe's largest Deinking facility in Schongau, Germany in 1989. In 1994, Voith and Swiss company Sulzer merged their technical papermaking operations to create Voith-Sulzer Papertec. This also included the paper activities of the Krefeld-based company Kleinewefers Group, which Sulzer had only acquired in 1992. In 1998, Voith acquired a majority stake in this enterprise. In 1999, Voith acquired the technical papermaking operations of British company Scapa, making it one of the leading companies for paper machine clothing technology. The year 2000 saw the creation of Voith Siemens Hydro Power Generation, a joint venture of the two leading manufacturers of turbine and generator technology. At the helm of the company, Michael Rogowski transferred operational responsibility to Hermut Kormann in 2000. Under his leadership, the group grew to become a global player with sales of more than 4 billion euros and a workforce of 34,000 people.

At the end of 2001, via the Voith Paper Holding, Voith took over Jagenberg's Jagenberg Papiertechnik in Neuss with its product lines including winders, cross-cutters and paper coating machines, as well as its manufacturing subsidiary Jagenberg Maschinenbau and overseas subsidiaries Jagenberg Inc. in Enfield, CT, USA, and Basagoitia in Tolosa, Spain. In 2002, Voith's Austrian subsidiary was fully incorporated into the Voith Group again as Voith Austria Holding AG. As German Property it had been integrated into the USIA (Administration for Soviet Property in Austria) by Soviet troops in 1945. Following the Austrian State Treaty in 1955 the company was an Austrian state-owned enterprise before Voith was able to recover its shares again over the years.

Voith went from strength to strength in the field of technical industrial services. With a controlling stake in the Stuttgart-based DIW Deutsche Industriewartung, the foundations were laid for the Voith Industrial Services division. This division grew over the following years and further acquisitions were made, e.g., the Imo-Hüther Group and Hörmann Industrietechnik. At the end of May 2005, Voith Industrial Services strengthened its leading position in the market for technical services and acquired the U.S. Premier Group. In November 2008, Voith Hydro took over the small Austrian hydro company Kössler, which was based in St. Georgen.

In May 2006, the Voith Paper Technology Technology Center opened in Heidenheim. In Scotland the Voith subsidiary Wavegen operated the world's first wave power plant, to feed electricity to a grid. The research activities in Inverness, Scotland, were discontinued in 2013.

In 2008, Voith gathered with 200 customers and partners from all over the world to celebrate the 100-year anniversary of the "Brunnenmühle" in Heidenheim, which had previously been upgraded at an investment cost of €20 million. The "Brunnenmühle" is the global R&D center for hydropower technology at Voith Hydro and one of the most modern test centers for hydropower plant components worldwide. Around 300 engineers work at Voith headquarters in Heidenheim and four other locations around the world, in São Paulo, Brazil; York, Pennsylvania, USA; Noida, India, and Västerås, Sweden. The "Brunnenmühle" is where Voith develops generators, turbines, control technology, shut-off valves and other hydro components.

At the Shipbuilding, Machinery & Marine Technology trade fair in 2010, Voith Turbo and one of its rivals each presented for the first time a rim-driven thruster for ships. Over an 18-month construction period, the world's most powerful single-engine diesel-hydraulic locomotive – the Voith Maxima – was developed. Since 2010, a large number of Voith Gravita shunting locomotives have been in operation at Deutsche Bahn (German Railways). In the same year, Voith celebrated the official opening of its new production and service center for the paper industry in Asia at Voith Paper City in Kunshan, China.

Also in 2010, the world's first wave power plant went into commercial operation in Mutriku on the Basque coast. For this plant, Voith supplied Spanish energy utility Ente Vasco de la Energia (EVE) with the equipment for the 16 Wells turbine units, which have a total output of 300 kilowatts and produce enough power for 250 households. The "oscillating water column" technology used in Mutriku means that the turbines do not come into contact with water. Instead, a column of air is set in motion that drives the machines. The kinetic energy of marine currents is converted to electrical energy with the help of unshrouded three-bladed horizontal axis turbines. This kind of marine current turbine is physically similar to wind power turbines.

Following the successful completion and in-depth analysis of the one-year test run in a model power plant near the South Korean island of Jindo Voith systematically continued its tidal current program with the construction of a one-megawatt machine on a 1:1 scale and developed the innovative low-maintenance tidal current turbine technology at the European Marine Energy Centre (EMEC) in Scotland to a commercial scale. Voith built a test turbine at its Heidenheim facility that was installed off the Scottish Orkney island of Eday from 2013 to 2015.

On October 1, 2010, Voith AG changed its name and legal status to Voith GmbH.

In 2013, the most powerful generator-turbine unit in Voith's history went into operation at the Chinese hydropower plant Xiluodu on the River Jinsha. After a 72-hour test run, Voith handed over the first of three of these machines to the China Three Gorges Corporation. At 784 megawatts, the generator-turbine unit generates more power than the largest hydropower plants in the world. Upon completion, the total output of the three Voith units for Xiluodu will be roughly equivalent to the most powerful nuclear power plant in Germany Gundremmingen.

At the start of 2014, Voith Turbo announced that it was stopping the production of new locomotives. A total of 20 Maxima and 165 Gravita locomotives had been built at the company's Kiel plant.

April 2014 saw the official opening of the Voith China Training Center. The vocational training and further education center in Kunshan (around 80 km northwest of Shanghai) is the company's largest training center outside of Germany. In the same year, Voith also celebrated the official opening of a new training center in Heidenheim, which every year provides training in 10 skilled commercial and technical occupations. Worldwide the company trains a total of 1,294 apprentices and students.

In February 2015, it was announced that Voith in Germany and Austria would cut 800 jobs in the paper machine segment and close the Voith Paper plants in Krefeld, Neuwied and St. Pölten. In 2016, the sale of the Industrial Services division was completed. Under the new owners, Triton Partners the business was split into two separate and independent brands. Since 2017, the service business for the automotive sector has been operating as Leadec, while the process and power plant industry segment became known as Veltec.

On August 1, 2017, Voith GmbH changed its name and legal status to Voith GmbH & Co. KGaA. In fiscal 2017, all the company's shares in KUKA were sold. In the same year, Voith acquired a majority stake in the German digital services provider Ray Sono. In 2018, Voith partnered with Franka Emika to establish the new joint venture Voith Robotics, which is now managed solely by Voith. As part of this process, Voith acquired a stake in Franka Emika GmbH. As part of a realignment in 2022, Voith Robotics has discontinued its market activities.

On July 31, 2020, Voith acquired a majority stake in the Croatian small hydropower company Sintaksa, which specializes in products and services for electromechanical and automation systems.

On December 1, 2019, the acquisition of BTG was successfully completed. The company, headquartered in Switzerland, makes machinery for a wide range of applications, primarily for paper manufacturers. On April 30, 2020, the acquisition of Toscotec S.p.A. was also successfully completed. Toscotec was founded in 1948 and specializes in the development and production of paper machines, systems and components for the production of sanitary papers, paper and board. Voith has also acquired shares in the sustainability start-up Yangi®, which is headquartered in Varberg, Sweden. Both parties signed the purchase agreement in December 2022. The company focuses in particular on the megatrends of sustainability and circular economy.

Voith has held 70 percent of the shares in ELIN Motoren GmbH since May 1, 2020. The acquisition of the remaining shares was completed in 2022. The company produces electric motors and generators in small series as well as for industrial applications. The Voith Turbo Group Division was also strengthened by the acquisition of the ARGO-HYTOS Group. This was successfully completed on August 2, 2022. ARGO-HYTOS, headquartered in Switzerland, develops and produces hydraulic components and systems with a focus on the off-highway sector (agricultural machinery, construction equipment and material handling vehicles). Voith's acquisition of IGW Rail was further announced in 2022. Based in Brno (Czech Republic), the company specializes in transmissions for rail vehicles. The acquisition will create one of the world's largest independent manufacturers of rail vehicle transmissions. As part of the realignment of the Group, Voith separated the commercial vehicle business of the Turbo Division as an independent company Driventic in November 2025. The aim is to sell Driventic to an investor.

== Corporate structure ==
Voith is represented in around 60 countries and maintains a worldwide network of sales, service, production, R&D and administrative locations. Even in its early years, the company was focused on developing global business relationships. As early as 1903, Voith had supplied turbines for a hydropower plant on the American side of Niagara Falls and for the first Chinese hydropower plant Shi Long Ba. In 1923, the company delivered its first paper machine to India. In 1903, it established its first subsidiary outside Germany, at St. Pölten in Austria, and 10 years later its first subsidiary in the USA. Voith has had a presence in Brazil and India since the 1960s and in China since the early 1990s. Its key regions are Brazil, China, Germany, Europe, India and the USA.

Even today, the Group is still entirely family owned, although since the 1960s, the heirs have been replaced in key management roles. The Voith family is currently one of the wealthiest families in Germany. According to Manager Magazin, the assets of the around 40 owners of the multinational corporation grew to €3.2 billion in 2012, but dropped to €2.2 billion in 2013.

Voith is engaged in projects in the education, social welfare, sporting and cultural spheres. Its corporate responsibility commitments range from financial support for relief projects and sponsorships to corporate-volunteering activities. These are realized through Voith GmbH & Co. KGaA – in some cases in collaboration with charitable organizations and also through the foundation Hanns Voith Stiftung established in 1953, and the Fundação Voith set up in Brazil in 2004.

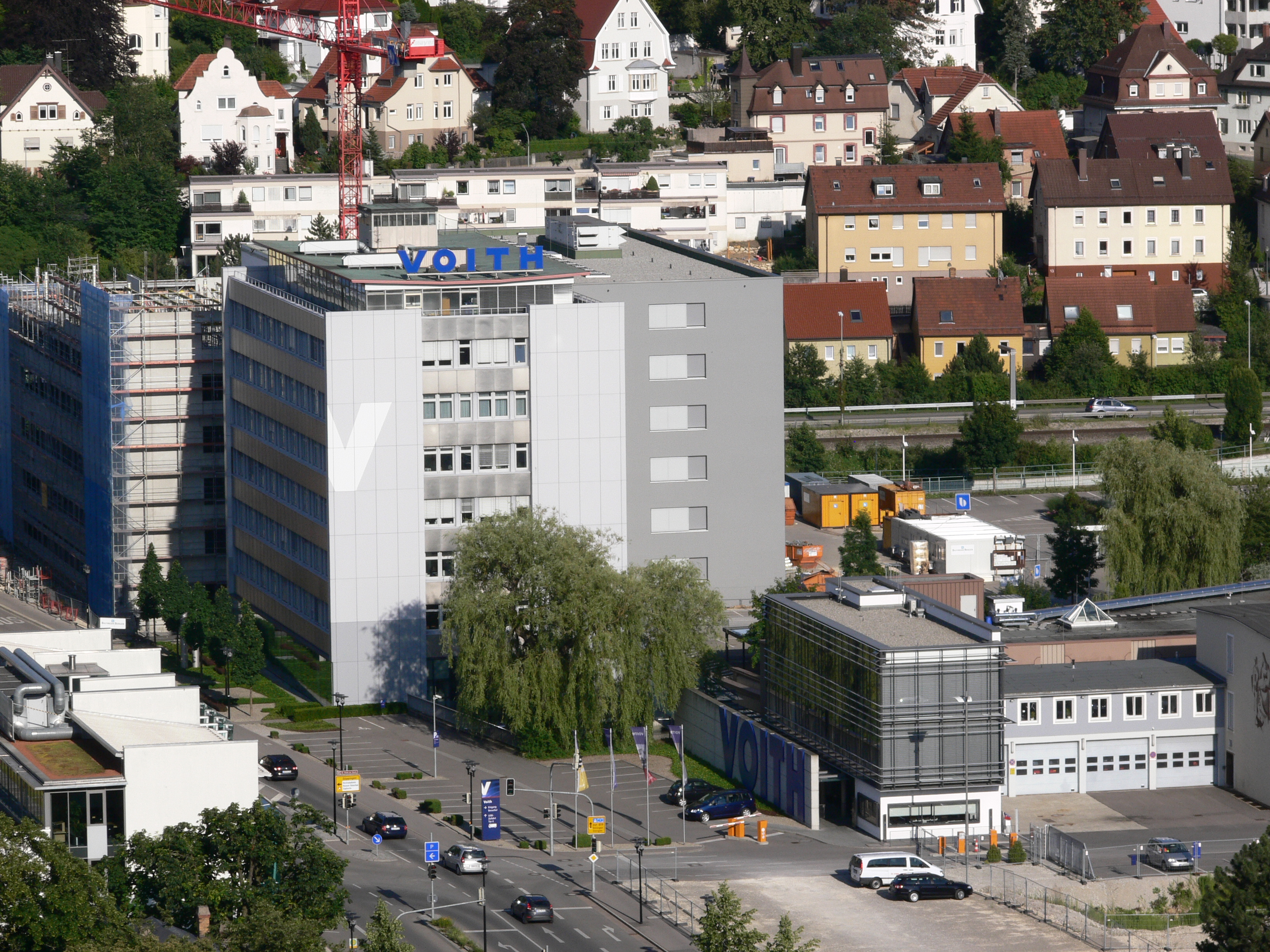
Main entrance to Voith headquarters in Heidenheim

With its portfolio of production plants, products and industrial services, Voith serves five key markets: energy, oil & gas, paper, raw materials, and transport & automotive.

Dirk Hoke has been the company's chairman of the Corporate Board of Management. since April 1, 2025. The chairman of the Supervisory Board is Siegfried Russwurm His deputy is Alexander Schlotz, Chairman of the Joint Works Council of J.M. Voith SE & Co. KG.

Voith GmbH & Co. KGaA, which is headquartered in Heidenheim an der Brenz, is the operational management holding company for the Group. The Board of Management of Voith GmbH & Co. KGaA is responsible for the strategic management and operations of the Group. The Shareholders' Committee and Supervisory Board act as advisory and supervisory bodies, respectively. The latter is also the monitoring authority with respect to the Management Board.

Voith's operations are organized into three corporate divisions: Voith Hydro, Voith Paper and Voith Turbo. The business operations of the subsidiaries of the corporate divisions are each managed by legally independent management companies. In addition, Voith had a 9.14% stake in SGL Carbon in Wiesbaden, and between December 2014 and July 2016, had a 25.1% share in KUKA beteiligt. Voith's stake in SGL Carbon was reduced to just under 3% by December 2016.

=== Voith Hydro ===
Voith Hydro, previously Voith Siemens Hydro Power Generation, is a joint venture of Voith and Siemens Energy (35% share of capital). In October 2021, Siemens Energy announced that it would withdraw from the joint venture and sell its minority stake to the partner.

Voith Hydro is a full-line supplier of equipment for hydropower plants of all sizes. Its range of products and services includes generators, turbines and pumps; measuring and control equipment and instrumentation; automation; hydropower plant upgrades; and services like maintenance and spare parts.

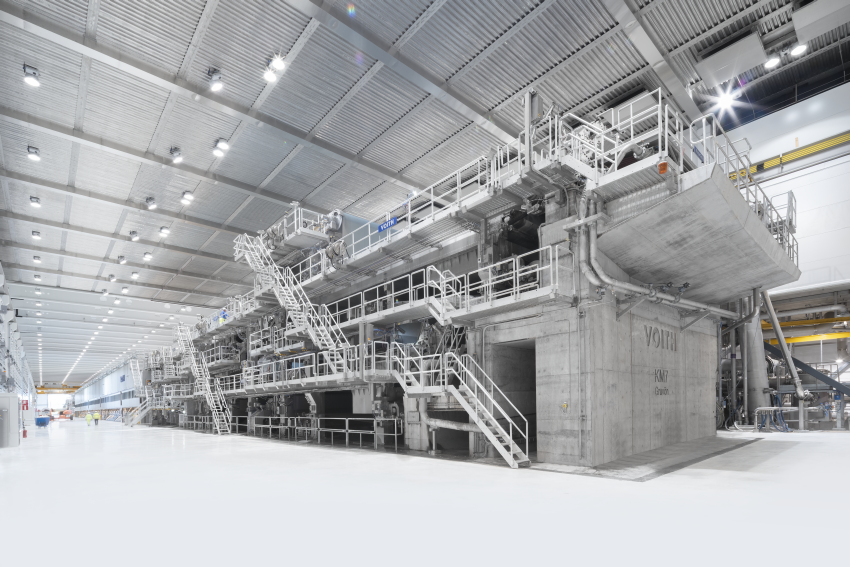
Cardboard paper machine designed, constructed and delivered by Voith Paper

Around a quarter of the energy generated by hydropower comes from plants operating with Voith technology. Voith products are used in many large hydropower plants like Niagara (1903), Macagua (1959 - 1963) in Venezuela, Itaipú (1976) and the Three Gorges Dam (2003). The construction of the Belo Monte Dam in the Brazilian part of the Amazon Basin, in which Voith Hydro is also involved, began in January 2012. Experts expect that by its completion, it could flood up to 516 km^{2} of (mostly forested) land and displace 20,000 people.

=== Voith Paper ===
Voith Paper is a system supplier for the international paper industry that covers the entire paper manufacturing process. Most paper production worldwide is done on Voith Paper machines.

Voith Paper offers

- Machinery for the treatment of primary and secondary fibers (e.g., from recovered paper)
- The supply of complete paper machines for all paper grades as well as rebuilds of individual paper machines
- Automation for the entire paper manufacturing process, e.g., process and quality control systems, sensors and scanners
- Paper machine clothing (e.g., forming fabrics), press sleeves, rolls and roll covers
- Services from product service to optimization of entire systems
- Technologies for the efficient use of all resources like water, energy and fiber, e.g., by using residues and wastewater for energy recovery
- Air conditioning and process air systems as well as drying and cooling technology

=== Voith Turbo ===
Voith Turbo is a supplier of mechanical, hydrodynamic, electrical, hydraulic and electronic drive and braking systems. Voith Turbo is the market leader worldwide for hydrodynamic transmissions. Within the Group, its core activities are as follows:

- For energy and oil & gas industries: hydrodynamic couplings (fluid couplings), variable speed planetary gear units, turbo gear units, hydrodynamic torque converters and actuating and control technology
- For industries including steel, mining and metalworking: Fluid couplings, hydraulic systems and components, Hirth serrations, high-performance cardan shafts, safety couplings and highly flexible couplings
- For rail vehicles: drive systems like turbo gear units, wheelset gear units, traction inverters, cardan shafts, cooling systems, Scharfenberg couplers and front ends
- For watercraft: Voith Schneider Propellers, water tractors, Voith Turbo Fin, Voith Linear Jets, Voith Inline Thrusters, Voith Radial Propellers

== Research and development ==
Voith holds several thousand active patents worldwide.

In fiscal 2022/2023, Voith invested a total €232 million in boosting productivity and the strategic alignment of the Voith Group. In the reporting period (2022/2023), the investment ratio as a proportion of revenue was 4,2% of the consolidated revenue (4,4% in previous year). Of the total R&D expenditure, €3 million was capitalized. At the same time, amortization of €12 million was recognized on capitalized development costs.

Voith's research and development activities have an international focus. The main R&D center is in Germany, but centers in America, Asia and the rest of Europe conduct specialized R&D projects in the respective Group Divisions. For example, the Tissue Innovation Center, which was established in São Paulo in 1994, was reopened in November 2011 following a major rebuild. In fiscal 2016/2017, Voith opened its own Voith Innovation Lab in Berlin to boost the process of innovation in the company.

== Literature ==
- Matthias Georgi, Tobias Birken, Anna Pezold: Voith: 150 Jahre deutsche Wirtschaftsgeschichte, Siedler Verlag 2017, ISBN 978-3-827501-11-0.
- Anne Nieberding: Unternehmenskultur im Kaiserreich. Die Gießerei J. M. Voith und die Farbenfabriken vorm. Friedr. Bayer & Co. (= Schriftenreihe zur Zeitschrift für Unternehmensgeschichte 9), Beck, München 2003, ISBN 3-406-49630-X.
- Hermann Schweickert: Der Wasserturbinenbau bei Voith zwischen 1913 und 1939 und die Geschichte der Eingliederung neuer Strömungsmaschinen. Dissertation der Universität Stuttgart, Siedentop, Heidenheim 2002, ISBN 978-3-925887-19-2.
- Voith GmbH: Mit guten Ideen voran – seit 1867: Die Voith Geschichte. Unternehmensbroschüre, Heidenheim, Januar 2013 / 2016 als PDF-Datei; 76 S., 1,7 MB oder auf docplayer.org.
