= Fibroin =

Insoluble protein present in silk

Fibroin light chain

Identifiers
- Symbol: L-Fibroin
- Pfam: PF05849
- InterPro: IPR008660
Available protein structures:
- PDB: IPR008660 PF05849 (ECOD; PDBsum)
- AlphaFold: IPR008660; PF05849

Fibroin heavy chain

Identifiers
- Organism: Bombyx mori
- Symbol: FIBH
- Orthologs: OMA: entry
- PDB: 3UA0
- UniProt: P05790
Search for
- Structures: Swiss-model
- Domains: InterPro
- For a view of homologs, perform BLAST on the P05790[1-108] portion.

Fibroin P25 (Fibrohexamerin)

Identifiers
- Symbol: Fibroin_P25
- Pfam: PF07294
- InterPro: IPR009911
Available protein structures:
- PDB: IPR009911 PF07294 (ECOD; PDBsum)
- AlphaFold: IPR009911; PF07294

Fibroin is an insoluble protein present in silk produced by numerous insects, such as the larvae of Bombyx mori, and other moth genera such as Antheraea, Cricula, Samia and Gonometa. Silk in its raw state consists of two main proteins, sericin and fibroin, with a glue-like layer of sericin coating two singular filaments of fibroin called brins.

Primary structure of fibroin, (Gly-Ser-Gly-Ala-Gly-Ala)_{n}

The silk worm produces fibroin with three chains, the light, heavy, and the glycoprotein P25. The heavy and light chains are linked by a disulfide bond, and P25 associates with disulfide-linked heavy and light chains by noncovalent interactions. P25 plays an important role in maintaining integrity of the complex.

The heavy fibroin protein consists of layers of antiparallel beta sheets. Its primary structure mainly consists of the recurrent amino acid sequence (Gly-Ser-Gly-Ala-Gly-Ala)_{n}. The high glycine (and, to a lesser extent, alanine) content allows for tight packing of the sheets, which contributes to silk's rigid structure and tensile strength. A combination of stiffness and toughness make it a material with applications in several areas, including biomedicine and textile manufacture.

Fibroin is known to arrange itself in three structures, called silk I, II, and III. Silk I is the natural form of fibroin, as emitted from the Bombyx mori silk glands. Silk II refers to the arrangement of fibroin molecules in spun silk, which has greater strength and is often used in various commercial applications. Silk III is a newly discovered structure of fibroin. Silk III is formed principally in solutions of fibroin at an interface (i.e. air-water interface, water-oil interface, etc.).

== Regulation of β-sheet formation in fibroin ==
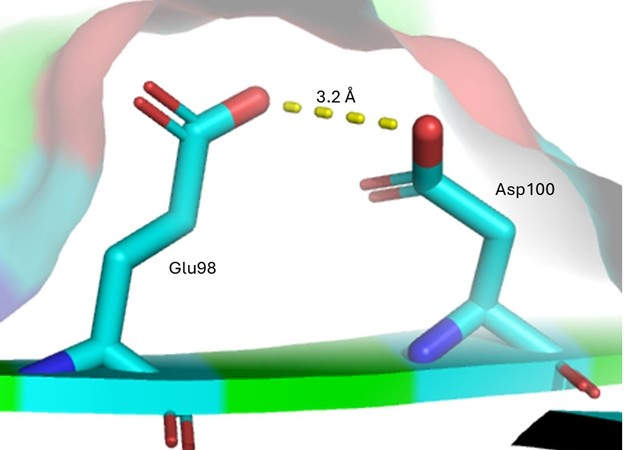
Residues of fibroin create electrostatic repulsion. PDB: 3UA0

In the fibroin β-sheet there are specific residues that are preserved in the N-terminal domain in order to prevent premature sheet formation at a neutral pH. Glu98 and Asp100 are both acidic, meaning they have negative charges when at a neutral pH. Since they have the same charge, the residues will create electrostatic repulsion which can cause the side chains to repel each other. At a low pH however, these residues would become protonated and lose their charge. When the charge repulsion is not present, hydrogen bonding and hydrophobic interactions become the main driving force of β-sheet formation. Therefore, when at a neutral pH Glu98 and Asp100 are deprotonated, and the electrostatic repulsion occurs. This repulsion reduces structural stability or can even prevent premature formation of the β-sheet. This is just one example of this interaction. This repulsion occurs between various other amino acids that the β-sheet is composed of. By preventing the premature formation, the electrostatic repulsions help ensure that the β-sheet is formed correctly which will allow for fibroin to function properly. The regulation of the β-sheet formation is especially important to the integrity of silk since fibroin is one of the primary structural proteins in silk.

== Materials science ==
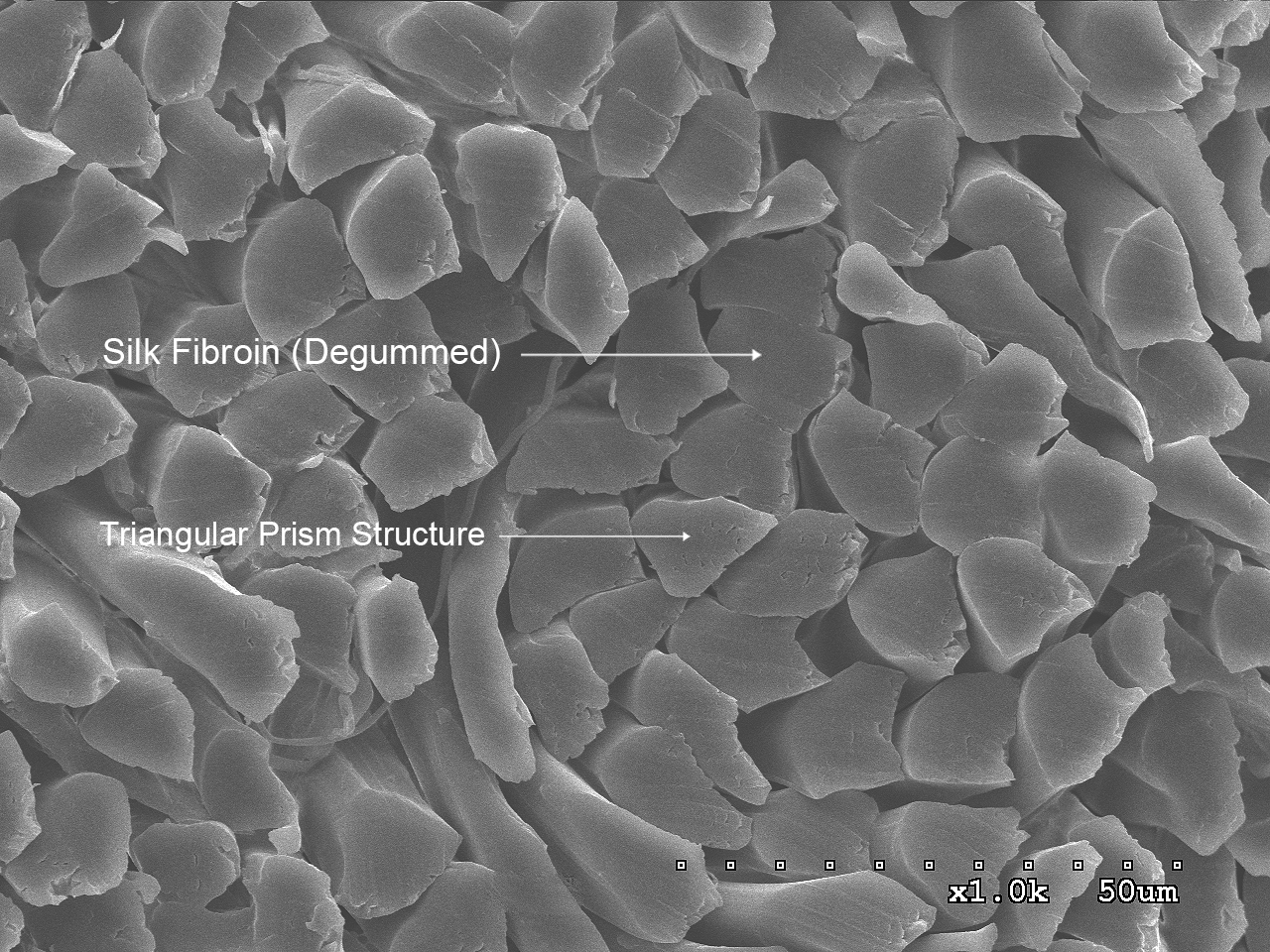
Cross-section of degummed silk fibroin filaments. The characteristic triangular prism structure refracts light, creating the fiber's optical luster.

Although silk fibroin has been used for millennia in the textile industry, over the last 20 years, it has become very popular in materials science. This popularity stems from the discovery that silk fibroin (particularly from Bombyx mori) can be redissolved in chaotropic salt solutions such as calcium chloride or lithium bromide. This process yields an aqueous solution similar to the form found in the silkworm's gland, which can then be used to create various types of materials. These materials include films, sponges, hydrogels, scaffolds, membranes, and silk fiber paper, a paper-like sheet material produced using papermaking methods.

Microscopic analysis characterizes silk fibroin filaments by a triangular prism cross-section, which enhances optical luster through refraction, and a smooth longitudinal surface, which minimizes the coefficient of friction compared to other natural fibers.

== Degradation ==
Many species of Amycolatopsis and Saccharotrix bacteria are able to degrade both silk fibroin and polylactic acid.
