= Papermaking =

Economic sector

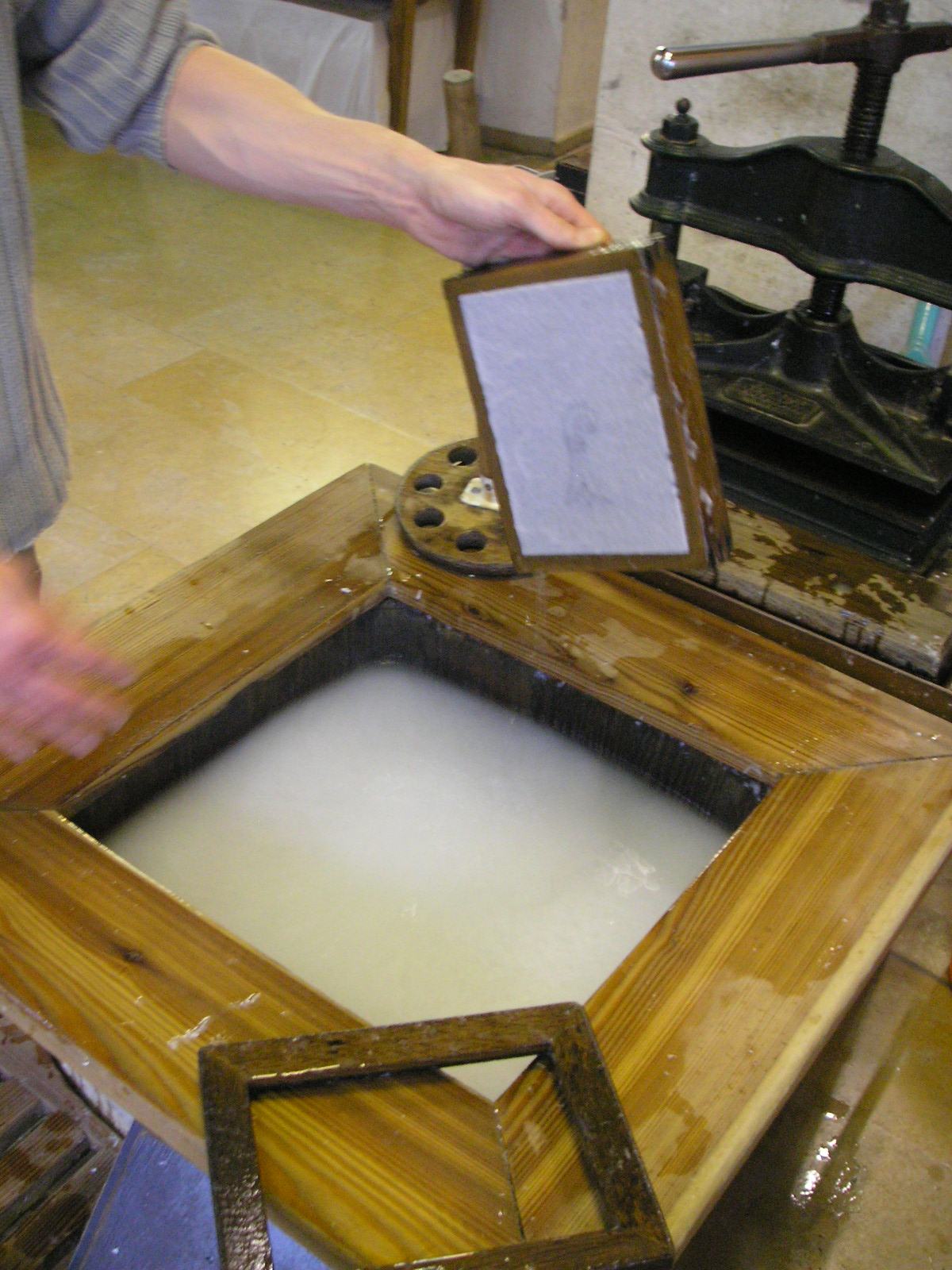
A sheet of fibres which were just collected from the liquid suspension with the screen. The next steps are to press it and to dry it.

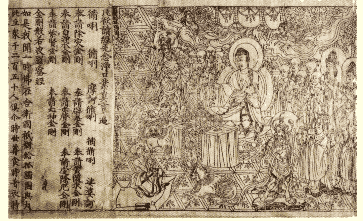
The Diamond Sutra of the Chinese Tang dynasty, the oldest dated printed book in the world, found at Dunhuang, from 868 CE

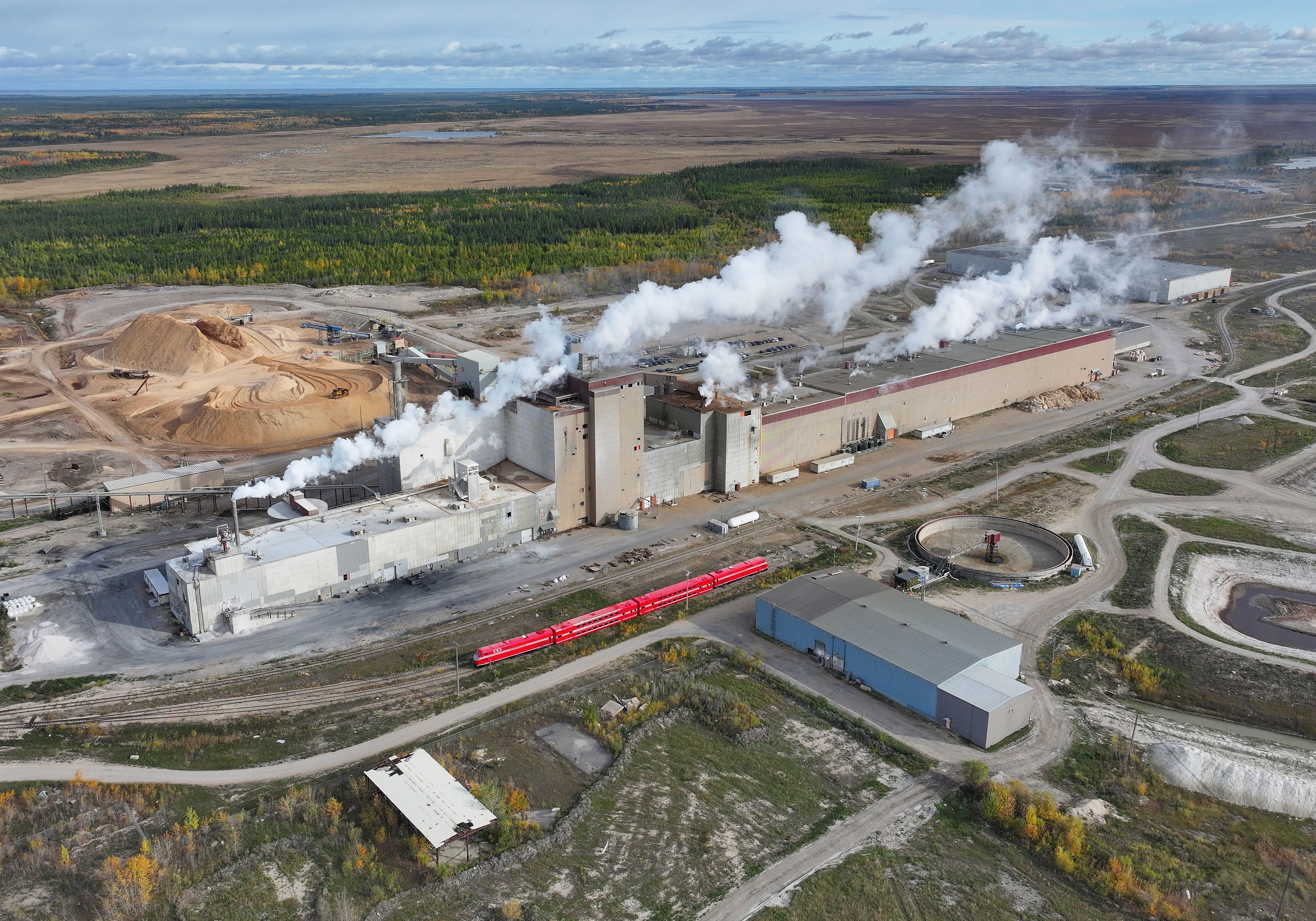
Canadian pulp & paper mill

Papermaking is the process of manufacturing paper and cardboard, which are widely used for printing, writing, and packaging, and numerous other purposes. Today almost all paper is made using industrial machinery, while handmade paper survives as a specialized craft and a medium for artistic expression.

In papermaking, a dilute suspension consisting mostly of separate cellulose fibres in water is drained through a sieve-like screen, so that a mat of randomly interwoven fibres is laid down. Water is further removed from this sheet by pressing, sometimes aided by suction or vacuum, or heating. Once dry, a generally flat, uniform and strong sheet of paper is achieved.

Before the invention and current widespread adoption of automated machinery, all paper was made by hand, formed or laid one sheet at a time by specialized laborers. Even today those who make paper by hand use tools and technologies quite similar to those existing hundreds of years ago, as originally developed in China and other regions of Asia, or those further modified in Europe. Handmade paper is still appreciated for its distinctive uniqueness and the skilled craft involved in making each sheet, in contrast with the higher degree of uniformity and perfection at lower prices achieved among industrial products.

== History ==
The word "paper" is etymologically derived from papyrus, Ancient Greek for the Cyperus papyrus plant. Papyrus is a thick, paper-like material produced from the pith of the Cyperus papyrus plant which was used in ancient Egypt and other Mediterranean societies for writing long before paper was used in China. Papyrus is prepared by cutting off thin ribbon-like strips of the pith (interior) of the Cyperus papyrus plant and then laying out the strips side-by-side to make a sheet. A second layer is then placed on top, with the strips running perpendicular to the first. The two layers are then pounded together using a mallet to make a sheet. The result is very strong, but has an uneven surface, especially at the edges of the strips. When used in scrolls, repeated rolling and unrolling causes the strips to come apart again, typically along vertical lines. This effect can be seen in many ancient papyrus documents.

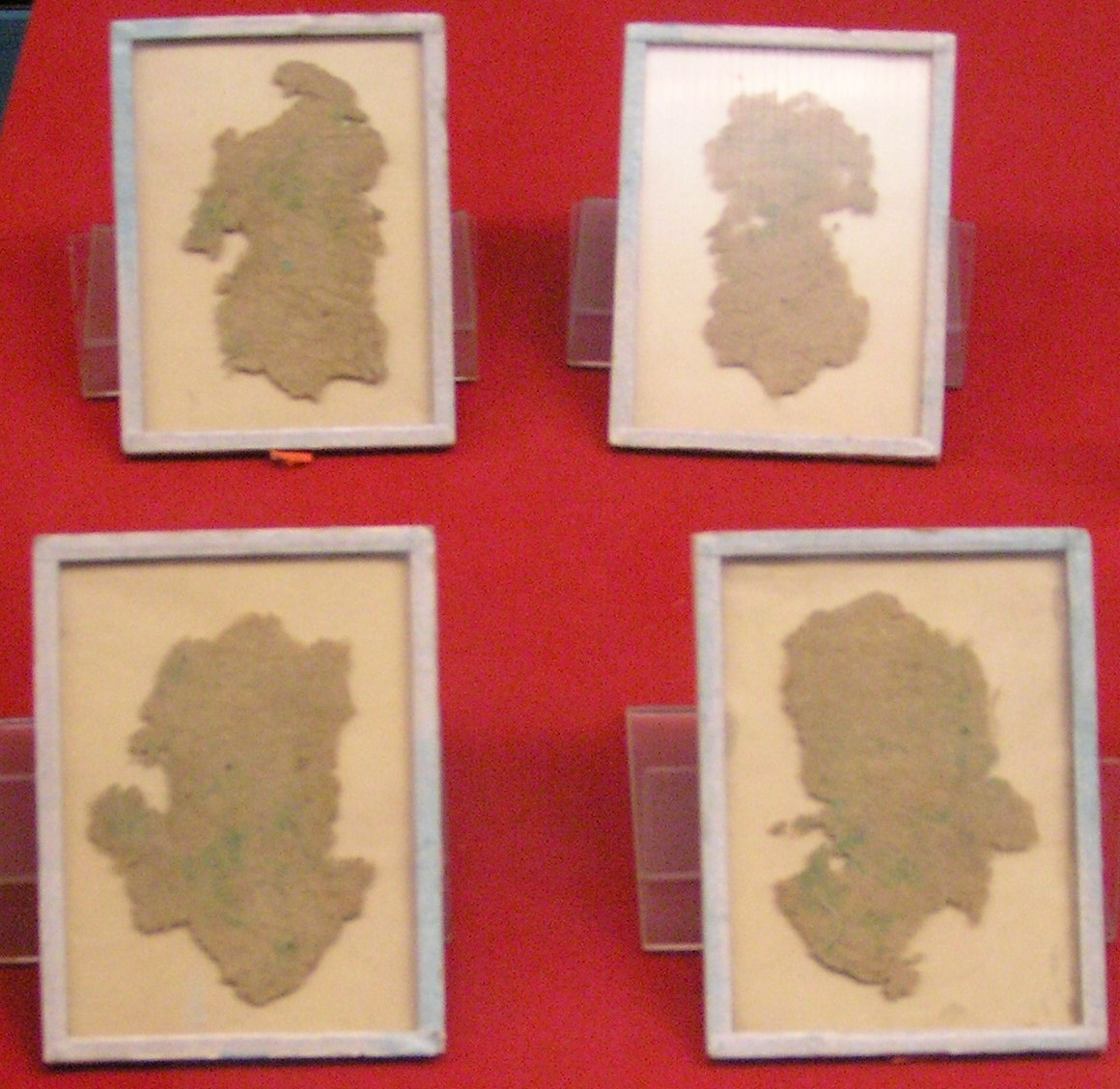
Early Xi'An hemp paper, dated to at least 87 BCE

Hemp paper had been used in China for wrapping and padding since the eighth century BCE. Paper with legible Chinese writings on it has been dated to 8 BC. The traditional inventor attribution is of Cai Lun, an official attached to the Imperial court during the Han dynasty (202 BCE – 220 CE), said to have invented paper about 105 CE using mulberry and other bast fibres along with fishnets, old rags, and hemp waste. Paper used as a writing medium had become widespread by the 3rd century and, by the 6th century, toilet paper was starting to be used in China as well. During the Tang dynasty (618–907 CE) paper was folded and sewn into square bags to preserve the flavour of tea, while the later Song dynasty (960–1279 CE) was the first government to issue paper-printed money.

In the 8th century, papermaking spread to the Islamic world, where the process was refined, and machinery was designed for bulk manufacturing. Production began in Samarkand, Baghdad, Damascus, Cairo, Morocco, and then Muslim Spain. In Baghdad, papermaking was under the supervision of the Grand Vizier Ja'far ibn Yahya. Muslims invented a method to make a thicker sheet of paper. This innovation helped transform papermaking from an art into a major industry. The earliest use of water-powered mills in paper production, specifically the use of pulp mills for preparing the pulp for papermaking, dates back to Samarkand in the 8th century. The earliest references to paper mills also come from the medieval Islamic world, where they were first noted in the 9th century by Arabic geographers in Damascus.

Traditional papermaking in Asia uses the inner bark fibers of plants. This fiber is soaked, cooked, rinsed and traditionally hand-beaten to form the paper pulp. The long fibers are layered to form strong, translucent sheets of paper. In Eastern Asia, three traditional fibers are abaca, kōzo and gampi. In the Himalayas, paper is made from the lokta plant. This paper is used for calligraphy, printing, book arts, and three-dimensional work, including origami.

In Europe, papermaking moulds using metallic wire were developed, and features like the watermark were well established by 1300 CE. Initially, hemp and linen rags were the main source of pulp, with cotton eventually taking over from the late 1700s, due to increased availability from India and American plantations. Papermaking was originally not popular in Europe, as paper had few advantages over papyrus and parchment or vellum. It was not until the 15th century with the invention of movable type printing and the ensuing increase in demand for printing media that many paper mills entered production.

Modern papermaking began in the early 19th century in Europe with the development of the Fourdrinier machine, which produces a continuous roll of paper rather than individual sheets.

In 1844, Canadian Charles Fenerty and German Friedrich Gottlob Keller had invented the machine and associated process to make use of wood pulp in papermaking. This innovation ended the nearly 2,000-year use of pulped rags and start a new era for the production of newsprint and eventually almost all paper was made out of pulped wood.

== Manual ==
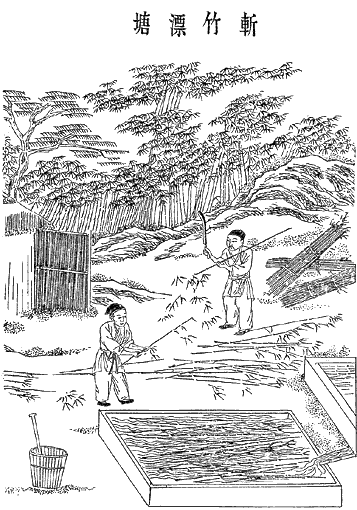
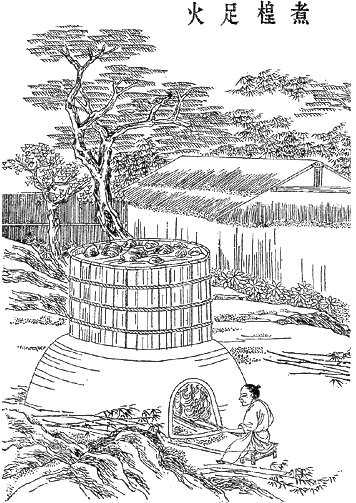
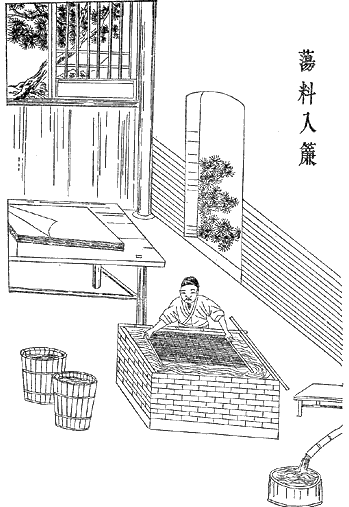
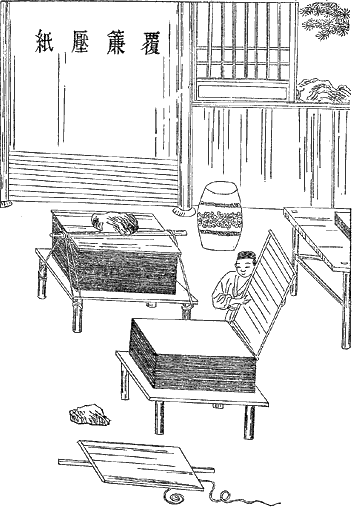
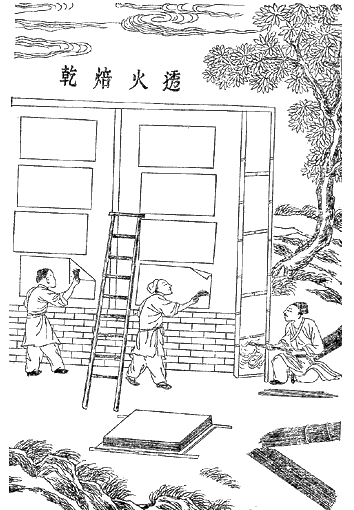
Woodcuts depicting the five seminal steps in ancient Chinese papermaking. From the 1637 Tiangong Kaiwu of the Ming dynasty.

Papermaking, regardless of the scale on which it is done, involves making a dilute suspension of fibres in water, called "furnish", and forcing this suspension to drain through a screen, to produce a mat of interwoven fibres. Water is removed from this mat of fibres using a press.

The method of manual papermaking changed very little over time, despite advances in technologies. The process of manufacturing handmade paper can be generalized into five steps:

1. Separating the useful fibre from the rest of raw materials. (e.g. cellulose from wood, cotton, etc.)
2. Beating down the fibre into pulp
3. Adjusting the colour, mechanical, chemical, biological, and other properties of the paper by adding special chemical premixes
4. Screening the resulting solution
5. Pressing and drying to get the actual paper

Screening the fibre involves using a mesh made from non-corroding and inert material, such as brass, stainless steel or a synthetic fibre, which is stretched in a paper mould, a wooden frame similar to that of a window. The size of the paper is governed by the open area of the frame. The mould is then completely submerged in the furnish, then pulled, shaken and drained, forming a uniform coating on the screen. Excess water is then removed, the wet mat of fibre laid on top of a damp cloth or felt in a process called "couching". The process is repeated for the required number of sheets. This stack of wet mats is then pressed in a hydraulic press. The fairly damp fibre is then dried using a variety of methods, such as vacuum drying or simply air drying. Sometimes, the individual sheet is rolled to flatten, harden, and refine the surface. Finally, the paper is then cut to the desired shape or the standard shape (A4, letter, legal, etc.) and packed.

The wooden frame is called a "deckle". The deckle leaves the edges of the paper slightly irregular and wavy, called "deckle edges", one of the indications that the paper was made by hand. Deckle-edged paper is occasionally mechanically imitated today to create the impression of old-fashioned luxury. The impressions in paper caused by the wires in the screen that run sideways are called "laid lines" and the impressions made, usually from top to bottom, by the wires holding the sideways wires together are called "chain lines". Watermarks are created by weaving a design into the wires in the mould. Handmade paper generally folds and tears more evenly along the laid lines.

Handmade paper is also prepared in laboratories to study papermaking and in paper mills to check the quality of the production process. The "handsheets" made according to TAPPI Standard T 205 are circular sheets 15.9 cm (6.25 in) in diameter and are tested for paper characteristics such as brightness, strength and degree of sizing. Paper made from other fibers, cotton being the most common, tends to be valued higher than wood-based paper. Papermaking methods have also been applied experimentally to non-cellulosic materials such as silk fiber paper, which is produced from protein-based silk fibers rather than plant-derived cellulose.

== Industrial ==
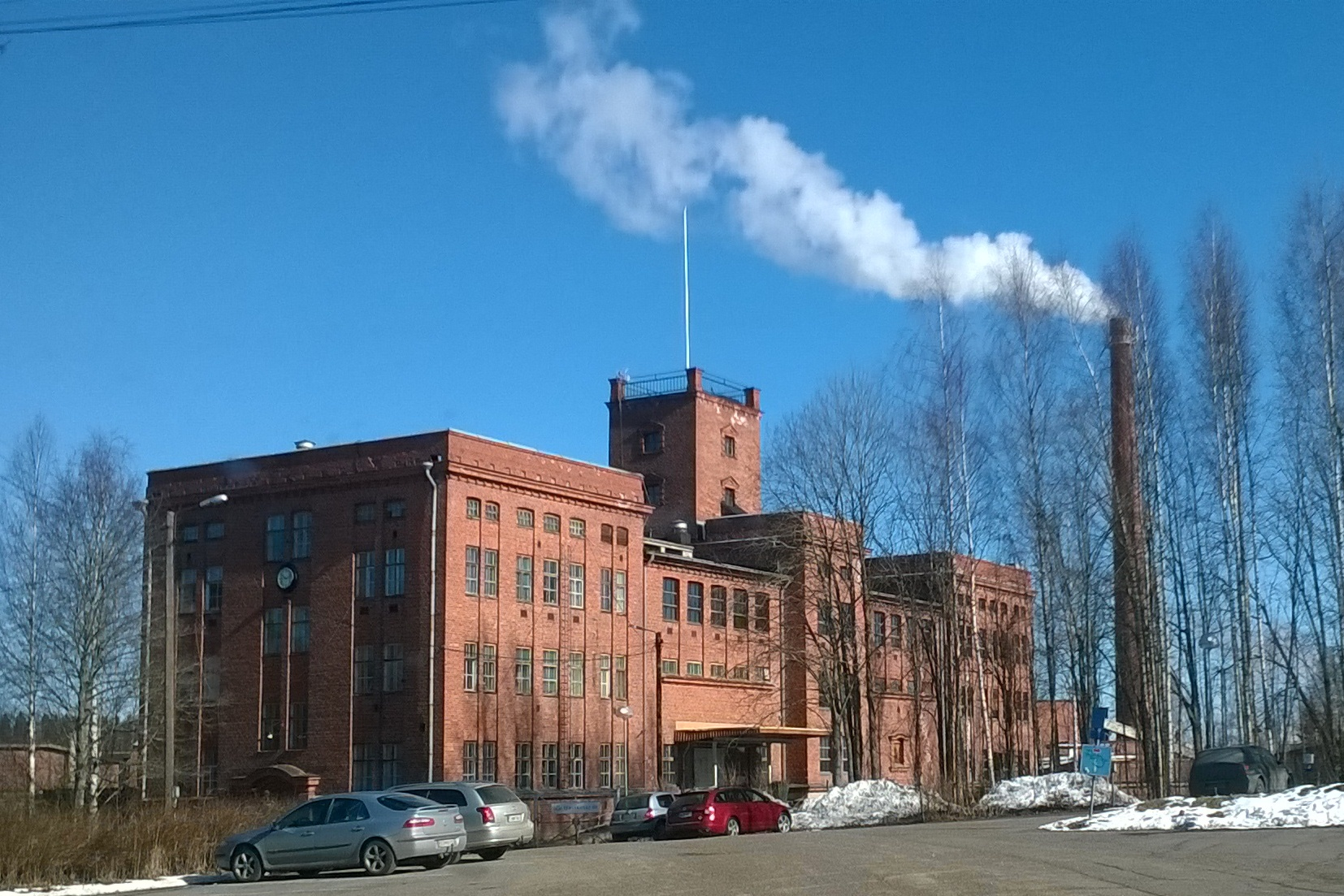
The Tervakoski Paper Mill in Tervakoski, Janakkala, Finland

A modern paper mill is divided into several sections, roughly corresponding to the processes involved in making handmade paper. Pulp is refined and mixed in water with other additives to make a pulp slurry. The head-box of the paper machine called Fourdrinier machine distributes the slurry onto a moving continuous screen, where water drains from the slurry by gravity or under vacuum. The wet paper sheet goes through presses and dries and finally rolls into large rolls. The outcome often weighs several tons.

Another type of paper machine, invented by John Dickinson in 1809, makes use of a cylinder mould that rotates while partially immersed in a vat of dilute pulp. The pulp is picked up by the wire mesh and covers the mould as it rises out of the vat. A couch roller is pressed against the mould to smooth out the pulp, and picks the wet sheet off the mould.

Papermaking continues to be of concern from an environmental perspective, due to its use of harsh chemicals, its need for large amounts of water, and the resulting contamination risks, as well as the carbon sequestration lost by deforestation caused by clearcutting the trees used as the primary source of wood pulp.

== Notable papermakers ==
While papermaking was considered a lifework, an exclusive profession for most of its history, the term "notable papermakers" is often not strictly limited to those who actually make paper. Especially in the hand papermaking field there is currently an overlap of certain celebrated paper art practitioners with their other artistic pursuits, while in academia the term may be applied to those conducting research, education, or conservation of books and paper artifacts. In the industrial field it tends to overlap with science, technology and engineering, and often with management of the pulp and paper business itself.

Some well-known and recognized papermakers have found fame in other fields, to the point that their papermaking background is almost forgotten. One of the most notable examples might be that of the first humans that achieved flight, the Montgolfier brothers, where many accounts barely mention the paper mill their family owned, although paper used in their balloons did play a relevant role in their success, as probably did their familiarity with this light and strong material.

Key inventors include James Whatman, Henry Fourdrinier, Heinrich Voelter and Carl Daniel Ekman, among others.

By the mid-19th century, making paper by hand was extinct in the United States. By 1912, fine book printer and publisher, Dard Hunter had reestablished the craft of fine hand paper making but by the 1930s the craft had lapsed in interest again. When artist Douglass Howell returned to New York City after serving in World War II, he established himself as a fine art printmaker and discovered that art paper was in short supply. During the 1940s and 1950s, Howell started reading Hunter's books on paper making, as well as he learned about hand paper making history, conducted paper making research, and learned about printed books.

== See also ==
- Amate, paper made of bark, used in pre-Columbian Central America
- Bookbinding
- Robert C. Williams Museum of Papermaking
- Basel Paper Mill
- Stickies (papermaking)

== Notes and references ==
24. Longwood L.C. "Science and practice of hand made paper": (2004). 25. Westerlund L.C. "Fibre options for the sustainable development of the Australian Paper and Pulp Industry": (2004)
