= Silk fiber paper =

Paper-like material

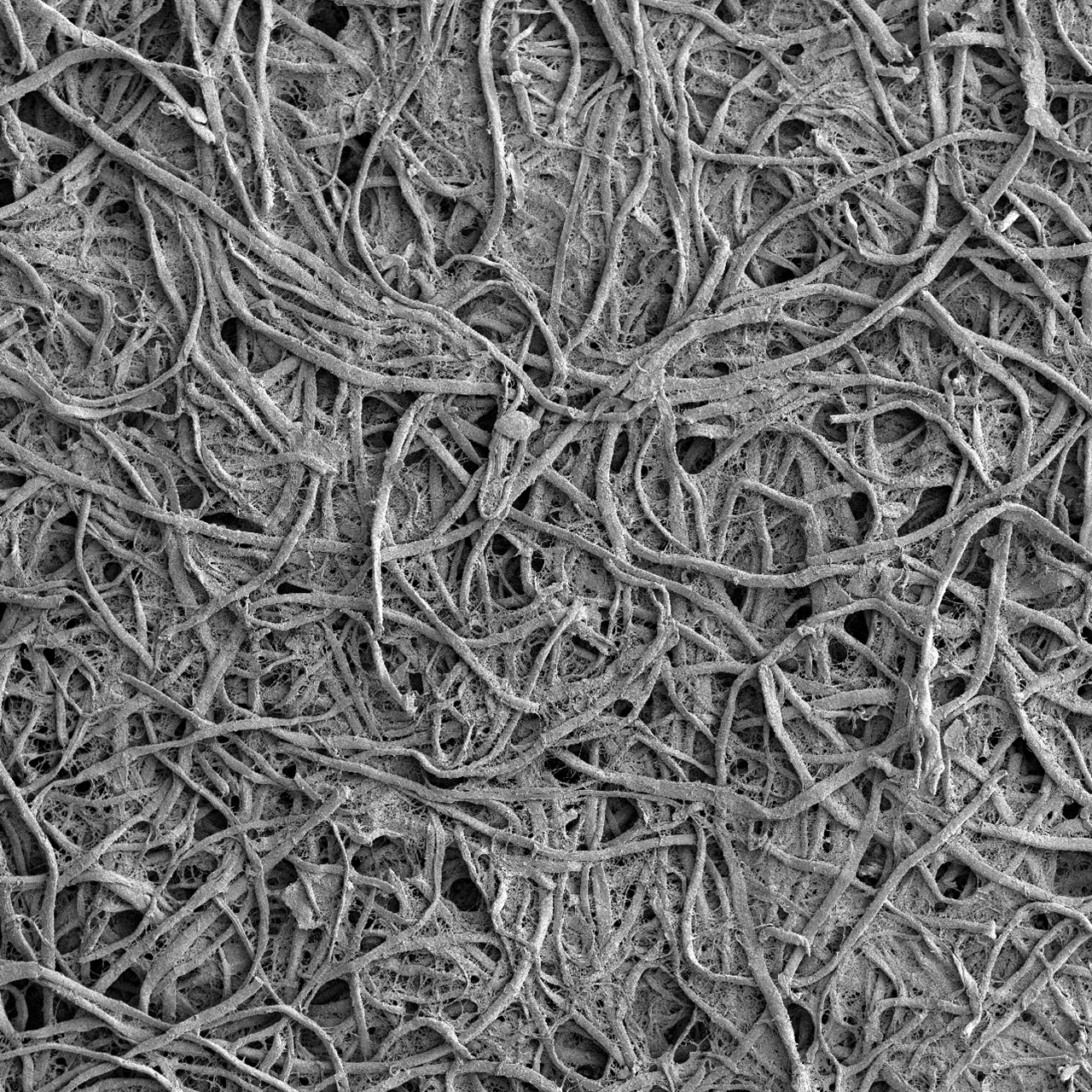
Scanning electron micrograph of handmade silk fiber paper showing the fibrous network structure at 100× magnification.

Silk fiber paper is a paper-like sheet material produced from mechanically processed silk fibers using methods derived from traditional papermaking.

Similar to paper made from plant fibers, silk fibers are mechanically macerated or beaten, suspended in water, formed into sheets on a screen, and dried to produce a coherent fiber network without the use of added adhesives.

== Manufacture ==
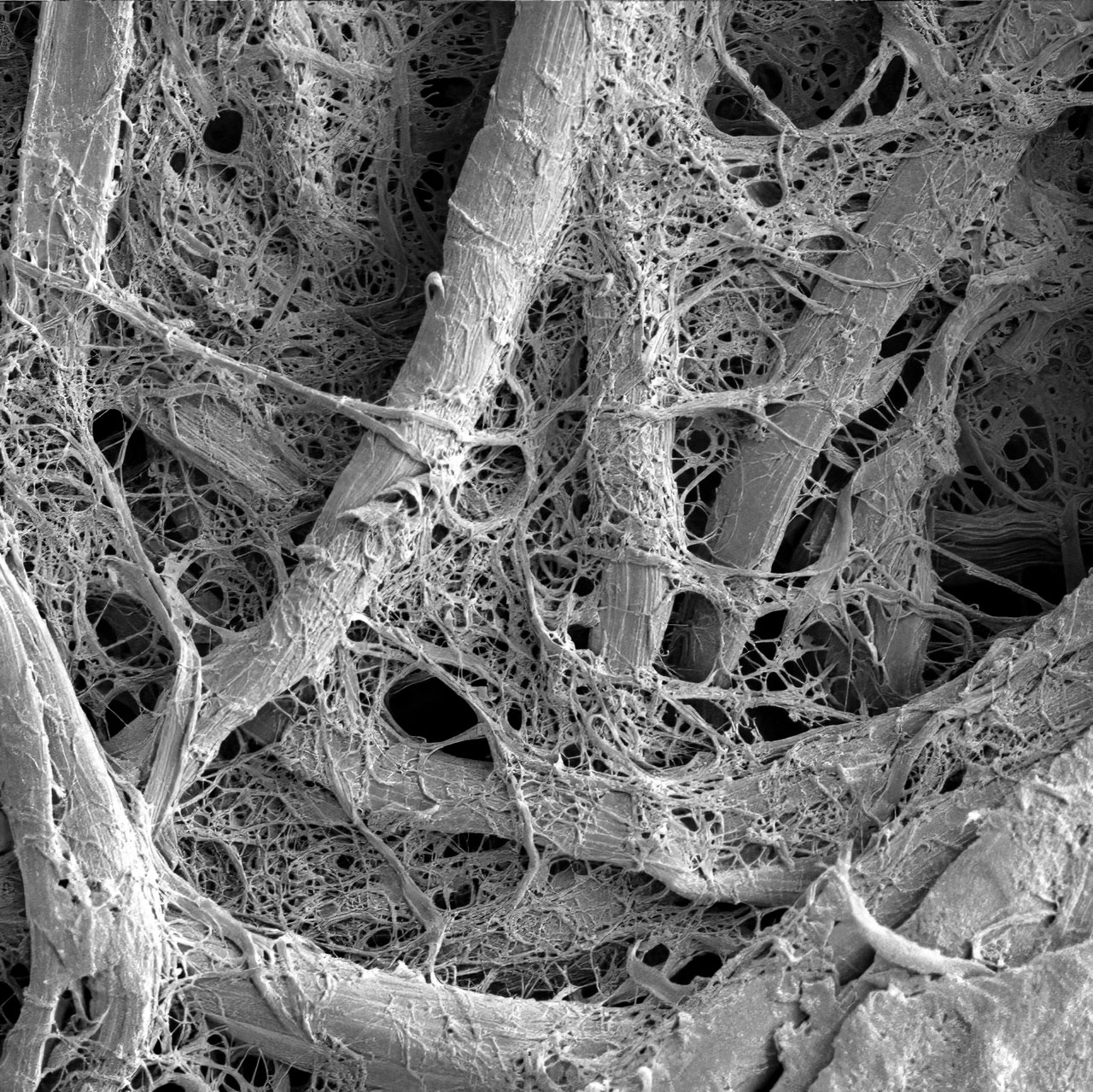
Scanning electron micrograph showing extensive fibrillation and fiber interactions within handmade silk fiber paper at 1000× magnification.

During beating, silk fibers undergo extensive fibrillation, splitting longitudinally into finer filaments and greatly increasing their available surface area.

These fibrils promote close contact and physical entanglement between neighboring fibers, allowing the resulting sheet to exhibit many of the handling characteristics associated with conventional paper, including flexibility, foldability, printability, and the ability to be cut or written upon.

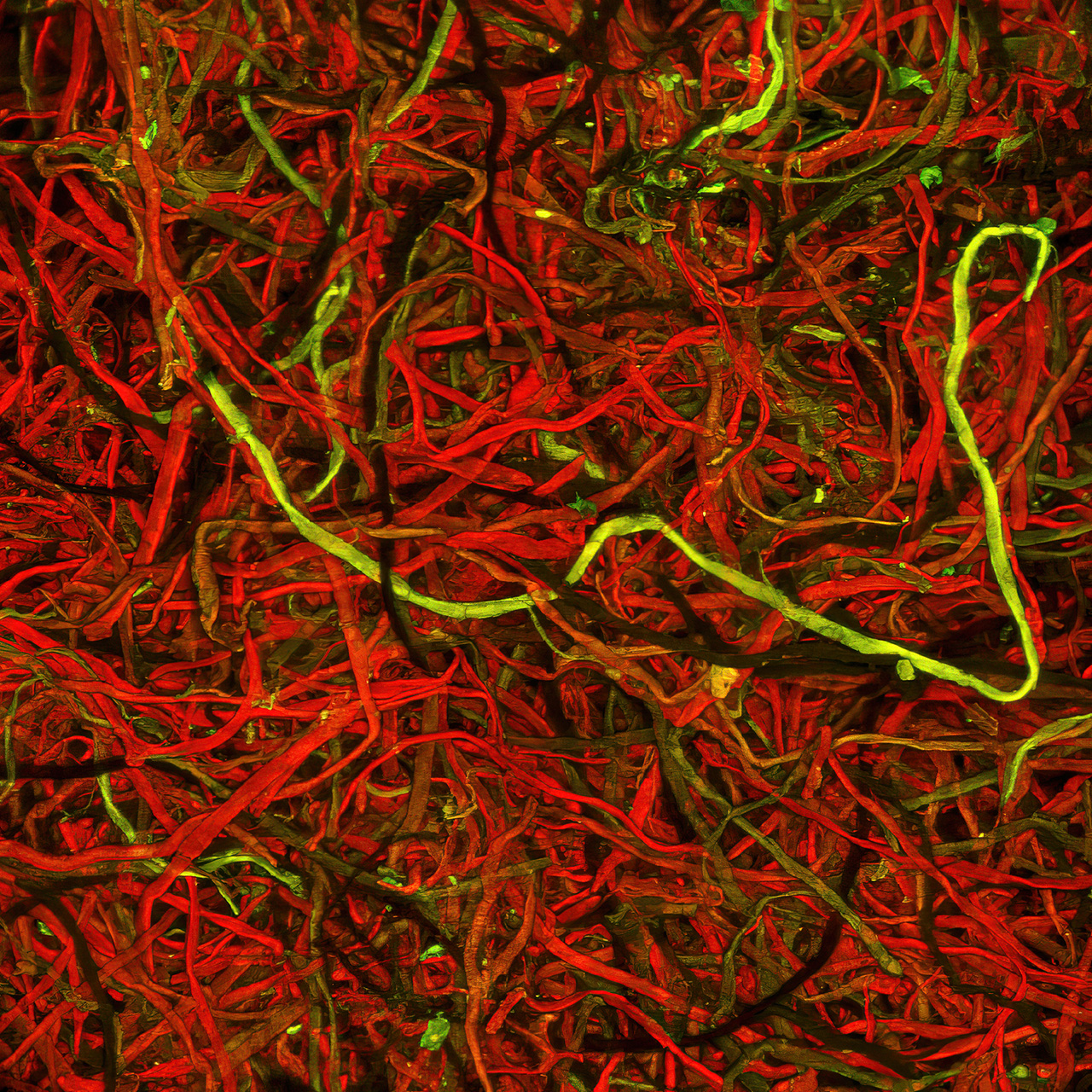
Confocal image showing the three-dimensional fiber network within handmade silk fiber paper.

== Structure and bonding ==
Once the water evaporates during drying, exposed fibroin on the surfaces of silk fibers may form hydrogen bonds with neighboring fibers.

Unlike cellulose paper, whose strength has traditionally been attributed primarily to hydrogen bonding between cellulose fibers, silk fiber paper likely derives its strength from a combination of physical entanglement, close fiber contact, and intermolecular interactions between silk proteins.

The relative importance of these mechanisms remains an active area of study.

Silk fiber paper shares many of the structural and handling characteristics of conventional cellulose paper while consisting primarily of fibroin, the primary structural protein of silk, rather than plant-derived cellulose.

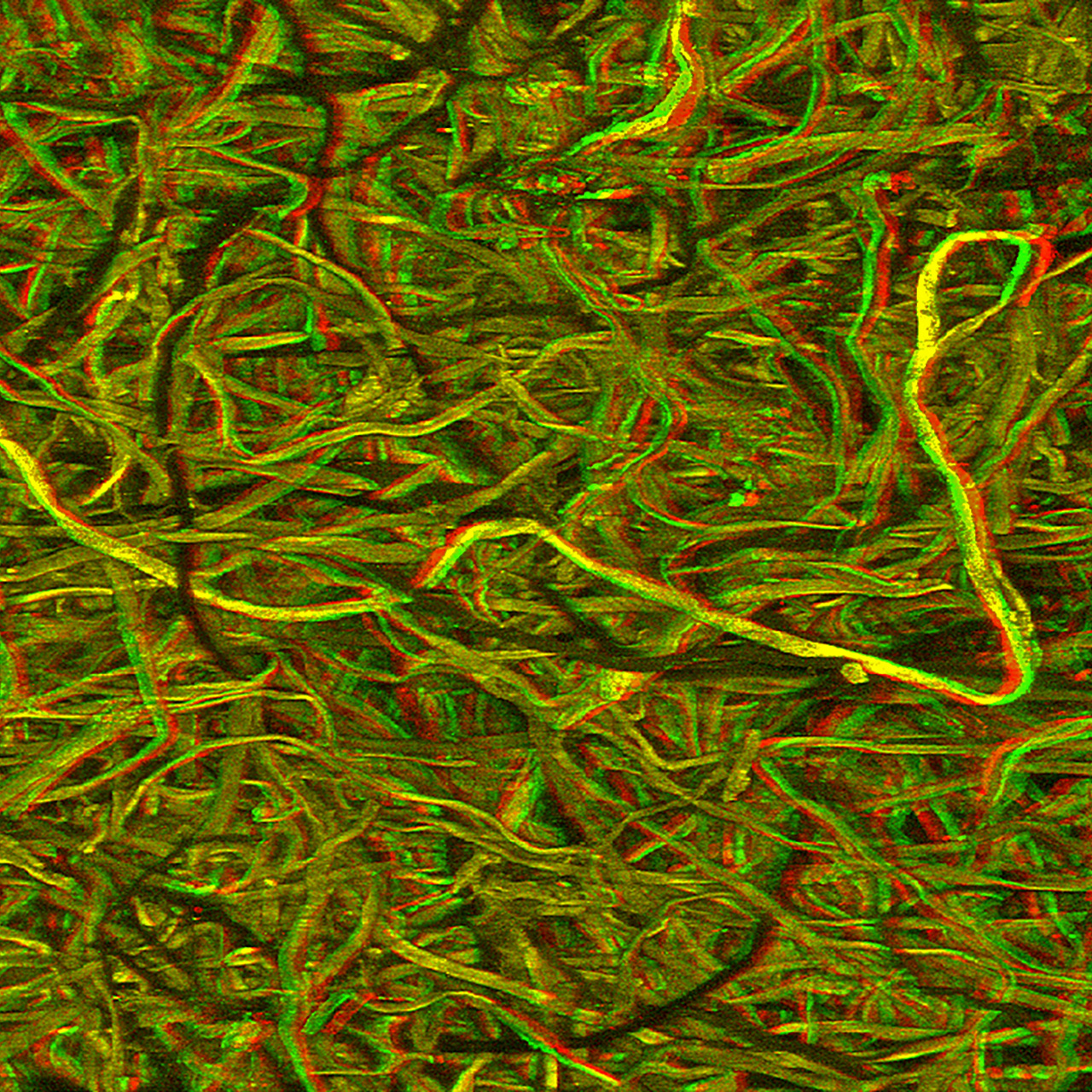
Three-dimensional confocal reconstruction of the internal structure of handmade silk fiber paper presented as an anaglyph image.

== Biomedical applications ==
Silk fiber papers and related silk-based membranes have attracted interest as biomaterials for medical and biological applications. The biocompatibility, biodegradability, and mechanical strength of silk fibroin have led researchers to investigate paper-like silk materials as substrates for tissue engineering, wound dressings, biosensors, drug delivery systems, and guided bone regeneration membranes.

Recent studies have demonstrated the use of silk fiber papers as porous matrices for immunosensing and diagnostic applications, where the fibrous network facilitates fluid transport while providing a surface for immobilization of biological molecules.

== Terminology ==
The term "silk paper" has historically been used to describe several unrelated materials. One example is Samarkand paper, also known as silk paper, a traditional handmade mulberry paper from Uzbekistan produced from cellulose fibers derived from the bark of the paper mulberry tree rather than from silk fibers.

In textile art, the term has also been used for decorative sheet materials made from arranged silk fibers and formed using binders or other consolidating methods. These materials differ from the silk fiber paper described in this article, which is produced by mechanically macerating or beating silk fibers and forming them from an aqueous suspension using papermaking methods.

== See also ==
- Nanocellulose
