= Matthias Koops =

British paper-maker (fl. 1789–1805)

Koops' Naturalization Act 1790
- Act of Parliament
- Parliament of Great Britain
- Long title: An Act for naturalizing Matthias Koops.
- Citation: 30 Geo. 3. c. 16 Pr.
- Territorial extent: Great Britain

Dates
- Royal assent: 1 April 1790
- Commencement: 21 January 1790 (Note: Start of session.)

Status: Current legislation

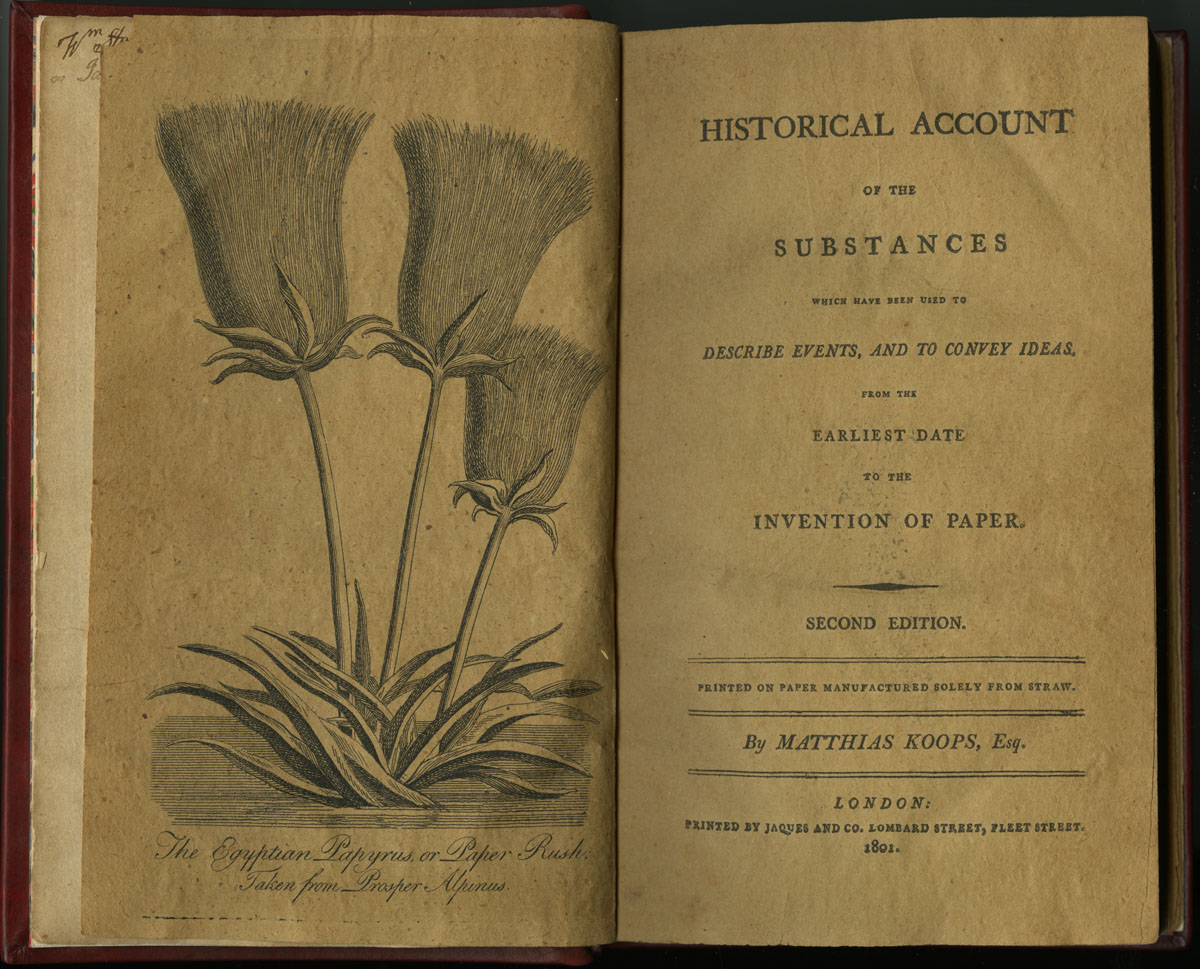
Historical account of the substances which have been used to describe events, and to convey ideas, from the earliest date, to the invention of paper, by Matthias Koops, 2nd edition, 1802

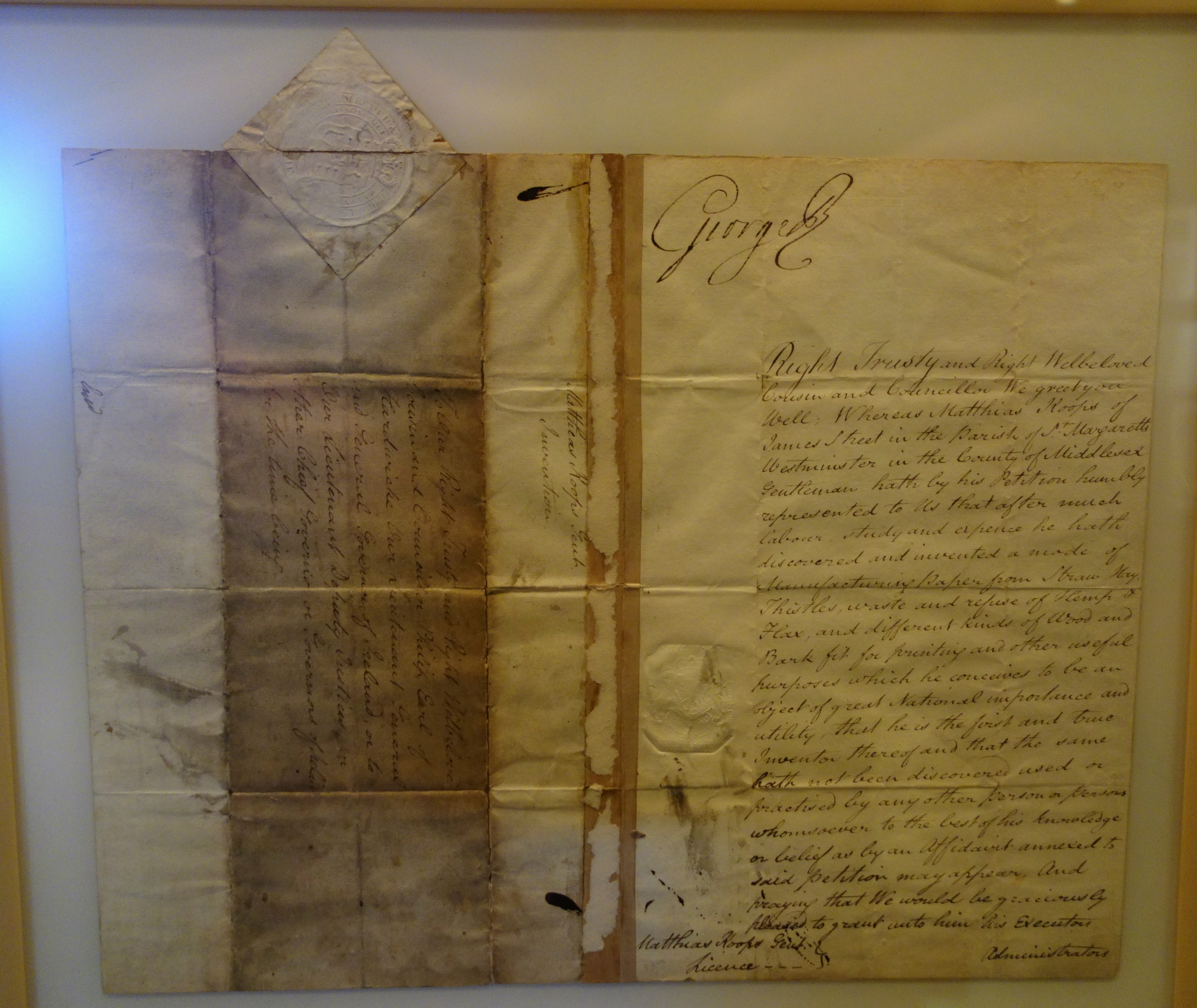
Mathias Koops' patent application regarding his invention for making paper from wood

Matthias Koops (active 1789–1805) was a British paper-maker who invented the first practical processes for manufacturing paper from wood pulp, straw, or recycled waste paper, without the necessity of including expensive linen or cotton rags.

Koops was born in Pomerania, the son of Matthias and Katherina Dorothea Koops. By 1789 he had immigrated to England, for he leased a house in Edmonton, London, that year. In 1790 married Elizabethe Jane Austen at St Marylebone Parish Church. He was naturalised on 1 April 1790 by a private act of Parliament, the Koops' Naturalization Act 1790 (30 Geo. 3. c. 16 Pr.).

From 1800–1801, Koops operated the Neckinger Mill in Bermondsey, London, where he experimented with making paper from straw, hay, wood pulp, recycled paper, and other items, without the necessity of cloth. In 1801, Koops was granted two patents for these inventions, issued on 17 February and 18 May. These patents granted him the "sole privilege of making paper from straw, hay, thistles, waste and refuse of hemp and flax, and different kinds of wood and bark" for a period of 14 years. In February 1801, he conveyed fractional ownership of shares in these inventions to James Stevenson and other individuals, and that same year launched the Straw Paper Manufacturing Company at Millbank. This company was at the vanguard of industrial paper-making, with its steam engine by John Rennie the Elder, Hollander beaters and at least one hydraulic press for squeezing water from the paper.

However, Koops had been declared bankrupt a decade earlier, on 30 June 1790, and still owed considerable sums to his creditors. These creditors settled with Koops in 1801, but claimed that they had not received their promised settlements, and on 14 October 1802, entered Koop's dwelling house and factory and seized and sold all contents. Furthermore, they claimed full rights to his patents, and thus disputed the fractional shares owned by Stevenson and others. (They won the subsequent lawsuit.)

On Christmas Day 1803, the Straw Paper Manufactury's proprietors were served notice for failure to pay rent, and in 1804 the factory was sold at auction. As a last measure, on 28 December 1805, the Straw Paper Manufactury's proprietors paid £1,000 to Koops' creditors, but in the end Koops was again declared bankrupt on 25 June 1812. He appears to have died before 1815.

== Written works ==
- Historical account of the substances which have been used to describe events, and to convey ideas, from the earliest date, to the invention of paper, 1801, printed on paper made from wood shavings.
