= Friedrich Gottlob Keller =

German machinist and inventor (1816–1895)

- Born: 27 June 1816; Hainichen, Kingdom of Saxony, German Confederation
- Died: 8 November 1895 (aged 79); Krippen, Kingdom of Saxony, German Empire
- Occupations: mechanic, machinist, binder, inventor
- Known for: The invention of wood pulp for the production of paper
- Awards: "Merit of Invention" by the German Government for his invention of the wood-cut machine for making pulp wood

Friedrich Gottlob Keller (27 June 1816 – 8 September 1895) was a German machinist and inventor, who (at the same time as Charles Fenerty) invented the wood pulp process for use in papermaking. He is widely known for his wood-cut machine (used for extracting the fibres needed for pulping wood). Unlike Charles Fenerty, F.G. Keller took out a patent for his wood-cut invention.

== Early life ==
Keller spent his childhood and youth working for his father as a weaver and heddle-maker in Hainichen, Saxony (north-eastern Germany). But he was unhappy in this occupation since his interest was in machines. Keller carried with him an "idea-book", where he jotted down different kinds of machines. He had subscriptions to many of the leading publications on machines, and was well read in the sciences of mechanics. In his late years he recalled an article he read in his youth about the work of the French mathematician René Antoine Ferchault de Réaumur. He took great interest in Réaumur's works and was curious about his efforts to find a method for making paper from trees. Réaumur himself never pursued the idea (later saying in 1742, "I am ashamed not yet to have tried this [paper making from trees] experiment since it is more than twenty years since I have realized the importance of it and since I have announced it."). It was an idea that stuck with Keller. In 1841 the 25-year-old Keller jotted down in his "idea-book" ideas for a wood-cut machine that could extract the fibres from trees for use in pulped-wood paper making.

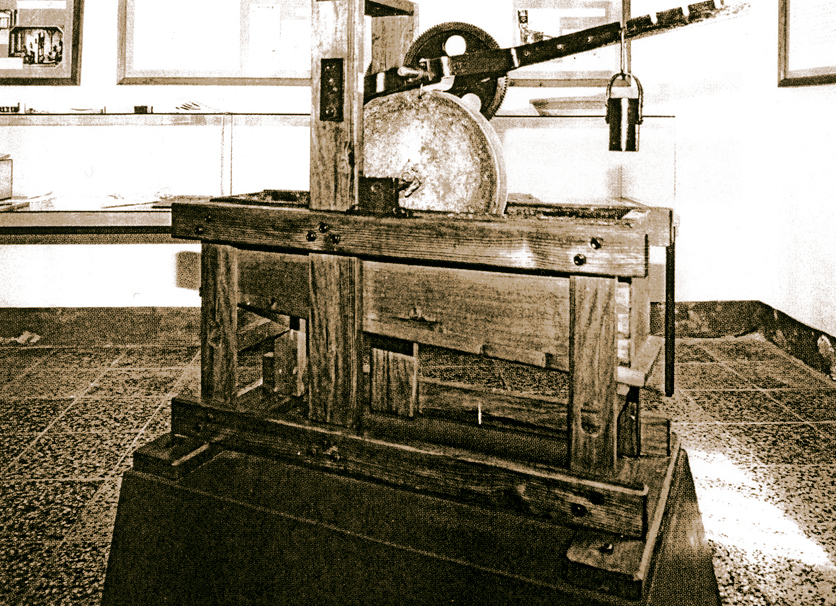
The F.G. Keller wood-grinding machine c.1854

== Keller's invention ==
Before wood pulp became widely available, paper was made from rags, which were a limited resource. In the 18th century French scientist René Antoine Ferchault de Réaumur suggested that paper could be made from trees. Though he himself never experimented, his theory caught the interest of others, namely Matthias Koops. In 1800 Koops published a book on papermaking made from straw. Its outer covers were made from trees. His method was not like Fenerty's (pulping wood); instead, he simply ground the wood and caused the particles to adhere. His book does not mention anything about wood pulping.

From 1841 (after noting his idea), Keller worked eagerly on his wood-cut machine. He had spent most of his life so far working with his father as a weaver and heddle maker, and on the side attempting to invent all sorts of machines. A wood-cut machine, however, became his true passion, to which he remained dedicated over the following three years (from 1841 to 1844). In 1844 he completed his work and produced a piece of pulped wood paper from the output of his wood-cut machine. In the summer of 1844 he sent in a sample paper to the German government, hoping to obtain financial support for an improved wood-grinder machine and to develop papermaking further, but without success. Both Charles Fenerty and F.G. Keller started working on wood-based paper at the same time, and made their discovery public at the same time, and at the same time found that no one was interested in it.

Keller remained dedicated to the project, but since he could not obtain national support he sold his invention to a paper specialist, Heinrich Voelter, for about £80. A patent was granted in August 1845 in Saxony, Germany, in both names (Keller and Voelter), and Voelter began production on a mass scale. Voelter did not want to leave Keller out at first because only Keller possessed the knowledge of how to build a suitable wood-grinding machine. Eventually that changed. After 1848 the first machines came out, and in 1852 the renewal of the patent came due, but Keller did not have the money to renew his part of the patent. Therefore, Voelter became the sole patent holder and continued the work, earning a large profit, without Keller.

== Later years ==
Heinrich Voelter remained the sole patent holder, leaving Keller unemployed and penniless. The wood-grinding machine was a success, though. Voelter had sold many throughout Europe and the Americas. By 1852 ground-wood pulped paper was being produced regularly in the mill of "H. Voelter’s Sons" in Heidenheim, Germany. The "Frankenberger Intelligence and Weekly" (in Saxony, Germany) was the first newspaper to use Keller's invention, pulped wood newsprint. It took a several decades for newspaper and book printers to take over the idea of using pulped wood instead of pulped rags to produce paper, but by the 1860s the new process had gained much popularity, and the transition began. By the end of the 19th-century few printers in the Western world were still using rags in lieu of wood for paper making. Throughout his life, Keller received no royalties from his invention. However, in 1870 he received from a number of German paper makers and other associations a small sum of money, which he used to buy a house in Krippen, Germany. Towards the end of his life a fair sum of money was collected for him in various countries, enough for a worry-free retirement, and he also received several awards in recognition of his invention.

== Bibliography ==
- Beneke, Klaus. Friedrich Gottlob Keller - Erfinder des Holzschleifers (27.06.1816 Hainichen (Sachsen) - 08.09.1895 Krippen bei Schandau (Sachsen)) Digitalisat (pdf, 196 kb)
- Gemeinde Krippen (Hg.): 1379-1979. 600 Jahre Krippen. Heimatkundlicher Lehrpfad durch Krippen, Pirna 1979
- Sittauer, H. L. Der Papiermüller von Kühnhaide, Berlin 1980
- Sittauer, H. L. Friedrich Gottlob Keller. Biographien hervorragender Naturwissenschaftler, Techniker und Mediziner Bd. 59, Leipzig 1982
- Burger, Peter. Charles Fenerty and his Paper Invention. Toronto: Peter Burger, 2007. ISBN 978-0-9783318-1-8
- Koops, Matthias. Historical account of the substances which have been used to describe events, and to convey ideas, from the earliest date, to the invention of paper. London: Printed by T. Burton, 1800.
- Pönicke, Herbert. “Keller, Friedrich Gottlob”. Neue Deutsche Biographie. Berlin: Duncker & Humblot, 1977.
- Schlieder, Wolfgang. Der Erfinder des Holzschliffs Friedrich Gottlob Keller. Leipzig, Germany: VEB Fachbuchverlag Leipzig, 1977.
- Sittauer, Hans L. Friedrich Gottlob Keller. Leipzig: BSB B.G. Teubner Verlagsgesellschaft, 1982.
- Walther Killy and Rudolf Vierhaus. “Keller, Friedrich Gottlob”. Deutsche Biographische Enzyklopädie. Munich: Die Deutsche Bibliothek, 1997.

== See also ==
- History of printing
