= Heinrich Voelter =

German inventor and paper manufacturer (1817–1887)

Heinrich Voelter (January 1, 1817 in Heidenheim – September 13, 1887 in Heidenheim) was a German inventor and paper manufacturer.

Heinrich Voelter grew up in Heidenheim and attended elementary school there, where he was taught by his grandfather. At age 14, he began an apprenticeship at a Heidenheim weaver shop. In addition, he learned from his father, who operated a local paper mill, the art of paper production. After the apprenticeship Voelter went to Bautzen to continue and complete his studies of paper manufacturing. While in Saxony, he met Friedrich Gottlob Keller (1816–1895), from whom he took over an 1846 patent for manufacturing paper from wood fiber mash. He further developed the method such that mass production of paper from wood became possible - until then, paper had been produced from rags. He returned to his hometown after his father's death in 1848, where he benefited from the help of Johan Matthäus Voith (1803–1874), who in 1852 constructed two grindstones for the Voelter paper mill. From 1856 to 1861 Heinrich Voelter served in the Parliament in Stuttgart.

Voelter and Voith sold grindstones to paper manufacturers in the whole world, including the Kübler und Niethammer paper factory in Kriebstein in Saxony. In 1864 the Voelter paper mill burnt down, and paper production in Heidenheim ceased for good (paper had been manufactured there since 1530).

Voith AG, founded by Voith, still develops and produces paper machines for international customers.
