= Papel volante =

Papel volante is a Portuguese name that designates a form of popular literature that may include popular prints. They date from the seventeenth to twentieth centuries, and are usually in an eight-page quarto format. They were at their height in the eighteenth century. They are similar to the French literature of colportage, English chapbooks or to the Spanish pliegos, papeles volantes or hojas volanderas. They are also known as literatura de cordel (string literature), particularly in the northeast of Brazil.

Two of the most famous authors of papéis volantes are Baltasar Dias (17th century) and José Daniel Rodrigues da Costa (18th century), who wrote misogynous texts. Baltasar Dias's Malícia das Mulheres (Malice of Women) had more than eighteen editions from 1640 until the twentieth century.
