= Rodolfo Lenz =

German-born Chilean linguist (1863–1938)

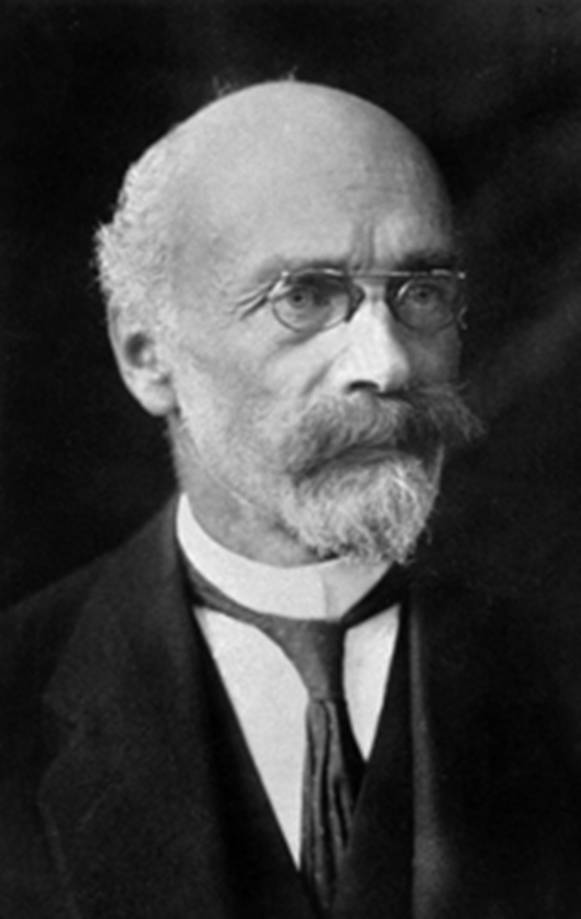
- Photograph of Rudolf Lenz Danziger, 1916
- Born: Rudolf Lenz Danziger; September 10, 1863; Halle (Saale), Prussia, German Empire
- Died: September 7, 1938 (aged 74); Santiago, Chile
- Occupations: Romance scholar, linguist, university professor, writer, philologist, folklorist
- Employer: University of Chile

Academic background
- Education: PhD in Philosophy
- Alma mater: University of Bonn; Humboldt University of Berlin
- Doctoral advisor: Wendelin Foerster; Adolf Tobler

Academic work
- Notable students: Ramón Laval Alvial; Julio Vicuña Cifuentes
- Language: Spanish
- Main interests: Chilean Spanish; Mapuche (Mapudungun); Culture of Chile; Papiamento
- Notable works: El español en Chile; Estudios araucanos

Signature
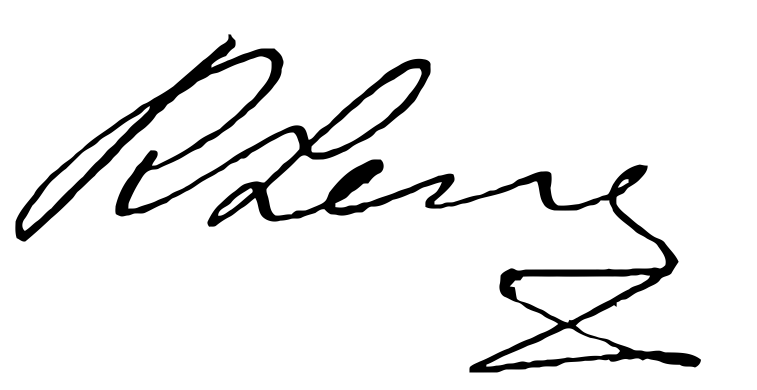

Rudolf Lenz Danziger, known as Rodolfo Lenz, (10 September 1863 – 7 September 1938) was a German linguist, philologist, lexicographer, and folklorist who was naturalized as a Chilean citizen.

== Biography ==
=== Mapudungún ===
Lenz is considered to be one of the primary authorities on the Mapudungun language during the 19th and early 20th centuries. In 1893, he published his article Beiträge zur Kenntnis des Amerikanospanischen (Contribution to the Understanding of Spanish in America). In this work Lenz analyzes the demographic evolution and cultural history of Chile, and describes the phonological systems of both the Mapuche language and Chilean Spanish. He argues that there are at least ten features of Chilean Spanish which can be ascribed to the influence of the Mapuche substratum.

=== Chilean Spanish ===
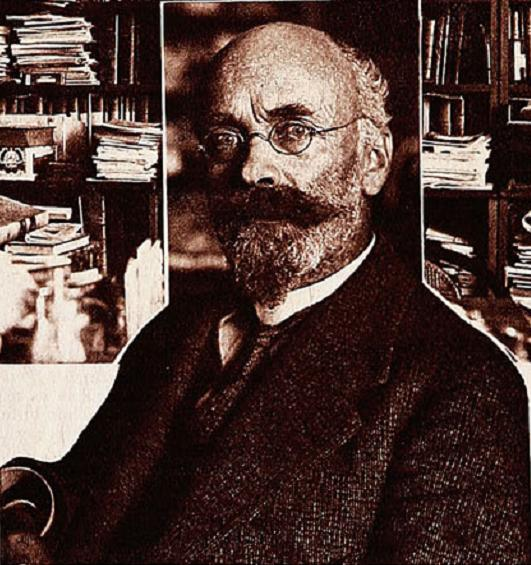
Rodolfo Lenz in 1915.

The arrival of Lenz in Chile in 1890 was of considerable importance in the history of the study of Spanish in the country. In his comparison of the phonemic system of Mapudungun with that of Chilean Spanish, he asserted that the latter is basically Spanish with Mapundungun sounds. M. Correa Mujica: Influencias de las lenguas indígenas en el español de Chile - nº 17 Espéculo (UCM) This theory, which came to be called indigenista ("indigenist"), was much discussed by Amado Alonso, who ascribed the shared features found by Lenz to have been due to methodological errors and that the rest could be explained as changes that could also be found in dialects of Spanish without Mapudungun influence. Contemporary scholars sided with Alonso and rejected Lenz's conclusions. Edward de la Barra had made similar assertions to those of Alonso.

Lenz also compiled the Diccionario etimológico de las voces chilenas derivadas de lenguas indígenas (1905–1910) (Etymological Dictionary of Chilean Words of Indigenous Origin), which was fundamental for lexicography in Latin America. The dictionary is now available online. devochdelia.cl.

El español ha evolucionado probablemente en Chile más que en ninguna nación de la tierra y es de un extraordinario interés fonético debido a sus originales peculiaridades de pronunciación (Spanish has probably evolved more in Chile than in any other nation on earth, and it is of extraordinary phonetic interest due to the peculiarities of its pronunciation.)

— Rodolfo Lenz, 1891

Lenz also made pioneering contributions to Chilean folklore with the 1894 publication of his first work entitled Lira popular (the People's Lyre). He also helped start a group of young folklorists who became the first generation to study popular culture. Among his students were Ramón Laval Alvial and Julio Vicuña Cifuentes, who compiled value material on popular culture in the first decades of the 20th century. These addressed a variety of areas: magical and religious traditions: romances, popular poetry, divining, songs, myths, and traditional legends. Lenz also compiled the Colección de Poesía Popular del Siglo XIX (Collection of Popular Poetry from the 19th Century) and the important article Sobre Poesía Popular (On Popular Poetry), printed in Santiago de chile in 1919. His influence on the principles and methods in pedagogy reached into all areas of investigation.

=== Lenz as creolist: Studies of Papiamentu ===
Lenz also published a pioneering study of the creole language Papiamento, which derives from both Spanish and Portuguese.

== Bibliography ==
- Lenz, R. (1893). Contribución para el conocimiento del español de América. Buenos Aires: Universidad de Buenos Aires.
- Lenz, R. (1904–1910). Diccionario etimológico de las voces chilenas derivadas de lenguas indígenas americanas. Santiago: Universidad de Chile. pp. 311.
- Lenz, R. (1909). Sobre poesía popular.
- Lenz, R., Andrés Bello y Rodolfo Oroz, (1940). El español en Chile. Traducción, notas y apéndices de Amado Alonso y Raimundo Lida, Buenos Aires, Biblioteca de Dialectología Hispanoamericana VI, Instituto de Filosofía y Letras, U. de Buenos Aires, 374 pp.
- Lenz, R. Colección de poesía popular del siglo XIX
- Lenz, R. (1927). El papiamento - La lengua criolla de Curazao: La gramática más sencilla. Impreso en los Anales de la Universidad de Chile, 341 pp.
