= Cordel literature =

Brazilian literary genre

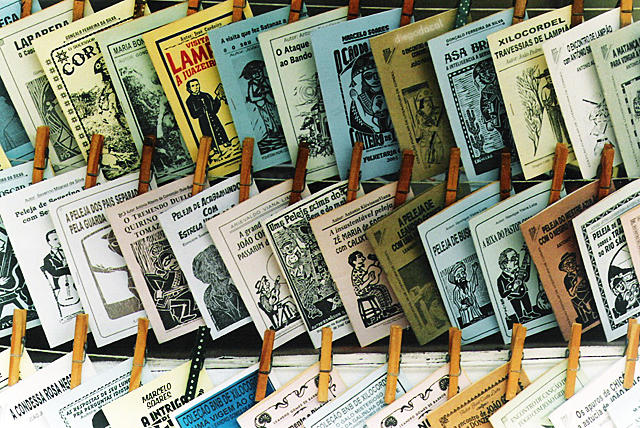
Literatura de cordel

Cordel literature (from the Portuguese term, literatura de cordel, literally "string literature", Portuguese pronunciation: [koʁˈdɛw]) are popular and inexpensively printed booklets or pamphlets containing folk novels, poems and songs. They are produced and sold in street markets and by street vendors in Brazil, mainly in the Northeast. They are so named because they are hung from strings to display them to potential customers, and the word for rope in Portuguese is corda, from which the term cordel is derived.

== History ==
Cordel literature forms one of the least altered continuations of the Western traditions of popular literature, such as chapbooks, and popular prints. Its history dates back to the 16th century, when the printing of oral reports became popularized in the Renaissance. This genre derives from the papel volante tradition of Portugal, a literary genre also found in Spain during the 18th and 19th centuries, and offered readers a wide array of topics, from basic instruction to political tracts. The name comes from the way the leaflets were traditionally displayed for sale, hung on ropes, twine or string in Portugal. It remains a popular literary form in Brazil. In the Northeastern region of Brazil, the name was adopted, but the leaflet may or may not be displayed on string. Some poems are illustrated with woodcuts, also used on the covers. The most common stanzas are those of ten, eight or six verses. The authors, or cordelistas, recite these verses in a melodious and cadenced way, accompanied by a musical instrument named viola. Readings or declamations of these verses are performed to win over potential buyers. In 1988, the Academia Brasileira de Literatura de Cordel (ABLC) [Brazilian Academy of Cordel Literature] was founded in Rio de Janeiro in order to bring together the exponents of this Brazilian literary genre.

According to the poet Carlos Drummond de Andrade it is one of the purest manifestations of the inventive spirit, the sense of humor and the critical capacity of Brazilians from the interior and of the humblest backgrounds.

== Form ==
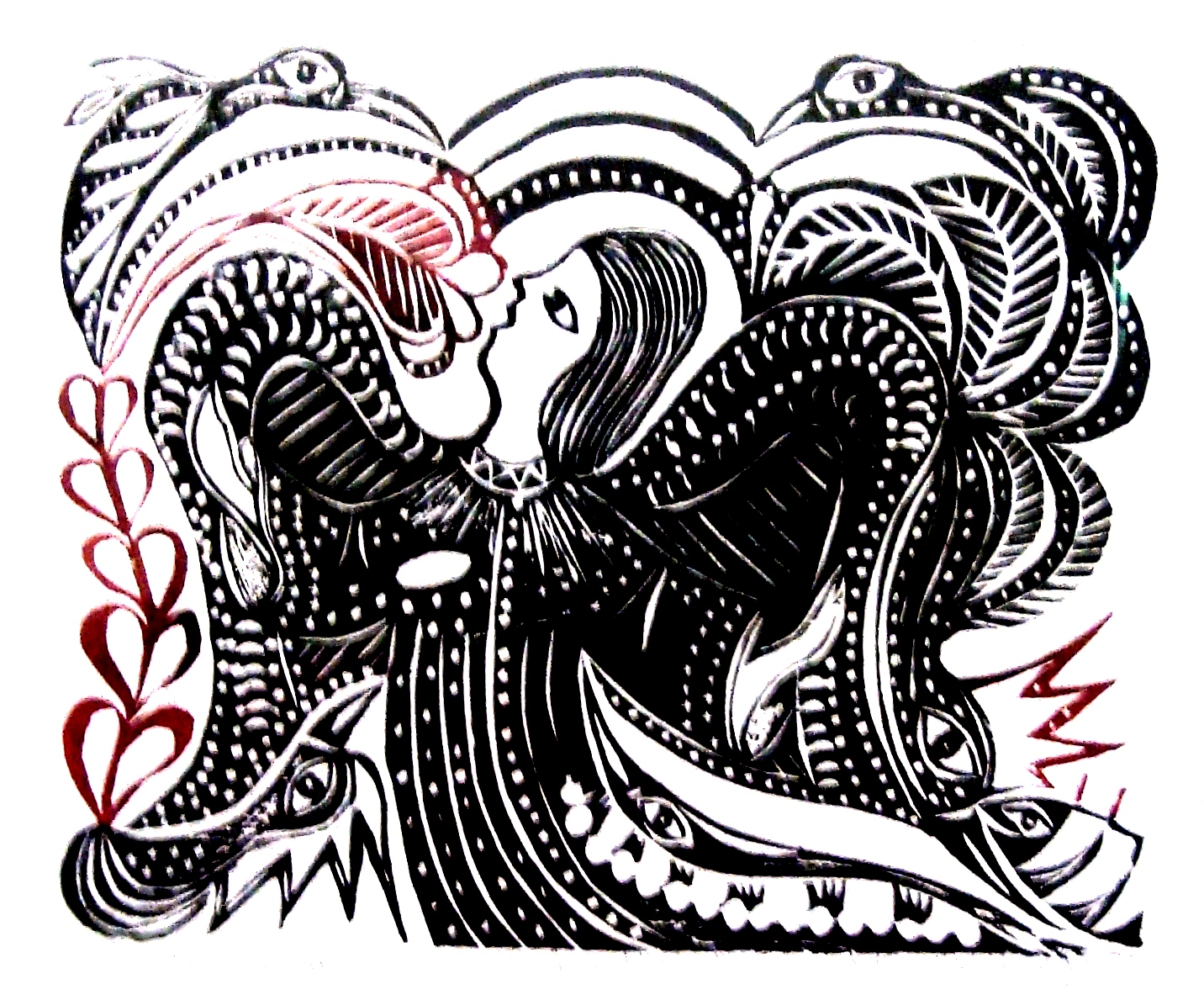
Woodcut by Yolanda Carvalho

Usually produced in black and white, in quarto format, cordel chapbooks are usually illustrated with woodcuts. Often both the author or poet's and the woodcut artist's names will appear in the credits of the book. Two expressive woodcutters are Adir Botelho and José Francisco Borges, whose woodcuts have been exhibited in the Louvre and the Smithsonian.

The cordel literature found its zenith in the decades of 1920s and 1930s, with the popular legend created by the cangaceiros of Lampião, a band of outlaws and bandolier bandits who terrorized the region for almost 20 years. The War of Canudos, a military conflict in the state of Bahia, 1896–1897, has been also a frequent theme of cordel literature, due to its epic dimensions and importance for the history of the Northeast backlands.

Cordel literature can still be found in the Northeastern Brazilian states, most notably in Pernambuco, Paraíba and Ceará.

== Authors ==
Two notable Cordel authors from the past are Leandro Gomes de Barros (1865–1918) and João Martins de Athayde (1880–1959).

Today, popular Cordel authors, such as Marcelo Soares, Davi Teixeira, Meca Moreco and Altair Leal, keep this tradition alive. These writers, among many lesser-known Cordel authors, help to show the importance of popular art to Brazil and to the world.

There are a lot of not-well-known cordel authors in Brazil, although there are still chapbooks that tell widely known old tales, even reinvented, in a new context. Two examples include A Chegada de Lampião no Inferno (The Arrival of Lampião in Hell) by José Pacheco, as well as A Chegada de Lula no Inferno (The Arrival of Lula in Hell). Besides "classics", living folk poetry tells us much both about cordel and its strong roots in the everyday life of the people and its place in Brazilian culture as a whole.

== See also ==
- Lira popular
