= Lira popular =

Style of poetry in Chile

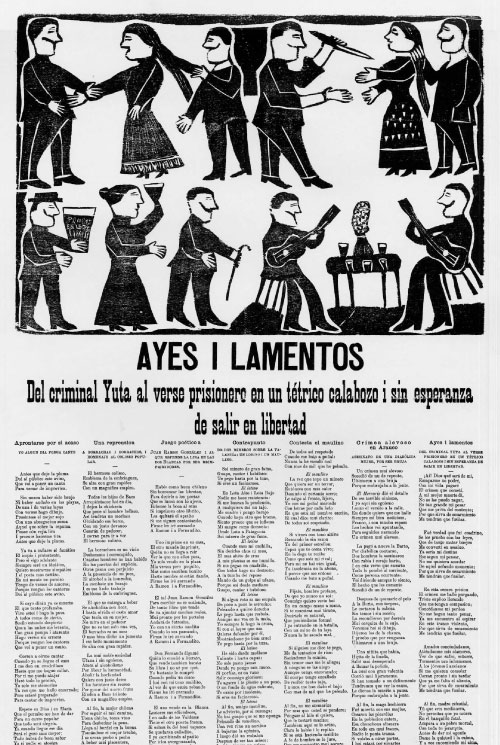

Lira popular (the People's Lyre), also known as string literature, is a style of poetry that emerged in Chile during the late 19th and early 20th centuries. Poets would write and print their works on loose sheets, which were then circulated in urban areas. To promote and share these poems, they were often hung from strings between poles or trees in public spaces. The title "La Lira Popular" was used in 1899 by poet Juan Bautista Peralta on his sheets, and the name came to apply to the whole genre. Many of the authors of these poems were peasants or poets who sought to reflect the voices and perspectives of the people, offering commentary on current events and social issues.

== Themes ==
Many of the poems in Lira popular revolve around themes such as poverty, love, violence, murder, life, death, crime, and religion. Poets deliberately selected these subjects to pique the curiosity of readers, while the accompanying illustrations vividly depicted the conditions and circumstances of everyday life.

== Printing ==
Lira popular was printed in various formats throughout its history. Early editions in Chile typically measured 26 x 35 cm, but they gradually grew in size to 54 x 38 cm. Each sheet contains five to eight poems accompanied by illustrations, often created by the poets themselves to enhance the narrative of the work.

There are two types of images commonly found in lira popular. The first is the woodcut, where poets or artists carved rough artwork into wood blocks. While the signature of the engraver was often omitted, Adolfo Reyes was responsible for many of these illustrations, carving his verses using a penknife and raulí board. The second type of image is the cliché. These were pre-existing, mass-produced plates that were not always directly related to the poem's content but were used for decorative purposes. The titles used in lira popular functioned similarly to modern newspaper headlines, employing large, bold fonts to attract public attention.

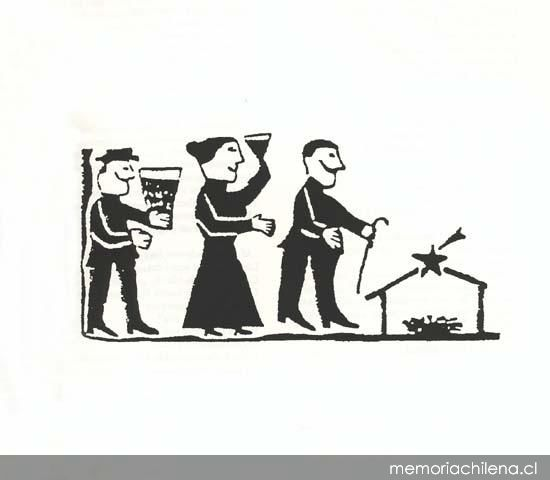
Greetings to the Child of God, an image sketched by Rosa Araneda c.1858

== History ==
In many Latin American countries, news dissemination was often slow, particularly between Spain and Central and South America. The introduction of lira, combined with the printing press, facilitated the faster spread of information compared to relying solely on oral communication. Initially, lira popular was used to reference events occurring in Spain and other countries. However, over time, it evolved into a cultural phenomenon and began to represent a country's own experiences and events.

In 1899, poet Juan Bautista Peralta gave his sheets the title "La Lira Popular," possibly to satirize the poetry magazine La Lira Chilena. The name would come to be applied to the whole genre, at least in Chile (for comparison, a similar style in Brazil was called literatura del cordel).

To have their poetry published in lira popular, poets had to register their names and take personal responsibility for ensuring the publication of their works. They would actively engage in public activities, going out into the streets and making dedicated efforts to sell their original works. Alongside signing their names or using pseudonyms, poets often distributed copies in public spaces where workers, peasants, and artisans could access them. Given the prevalent illiteracy of the time, the inclusion of images and public recitations helped attract people to listen to the readings of these poetic compositions.

=== Timeline ===
- 1541: Written poetic forms, such as romances and counterpoint, are introduced to Chile by missionaries and settlers.
- 1866: The Chincha Islands War (against Spain) prompts the first poetic documents dedicated to reporting current news.
- 1879: Famous poets use lira popular to provide commentary on the War of the Pacific.
- 1880: Bernardino Guajardo, considered a foundational figure in 19th-century Chilean poetry, publishes his work in five volumes following the lira popular format.
- 1891: The lira popular reaches its peak development and cultural "boom."
- 1920: Production declines due to the expansion of the modern publishing and journalism industries. German linguist Rodolfo Lenz publishes the first formal study of the genre in Chile.
- 1952: Diego Muñoz and Inés Valenzuela revive the name "Lira Popular" in newspapers, featuring contributions from various poets and payadores.

== Collections ==
Currently, three major collections of lira are preserved for public research. Two of these are displayed at the Archive of Oral Literature and Popular Traditions at the National Library of Chile. The third is in the Andrés Bello Central Archive of the University of Chile. Over 850 sheets of lira are preserved.

== See also ==
- Cordel literature
