= Fangmatan =

Archeological site located near Tianshui in China's Gansu province

Coordinates: 34.4°N 106.1°E

Fangmatan (simplified Chinese: 放马滩; traditional Chinese: 放馬灘; pinyin: Fàngmǎtān) is an archeological site located near Tianshui in China's Gansu province. The site was located within the Qin state, and includes several burials dating from the Warring States period through to the early Western Han.

== Tomb 1 ==
The date of the burial of Tomb 1 was approximately 230 to 220 BCE at the very end of the Warring States period; it was excavated in 1986. The tomb contained a number of long-lost texts written on bamboo slips, including almanacs (Rishu 日書), legal texts, medical works, and seven maps. The maps are drawn in black ink on four rectangular pieces of pine wood, 26.7 cm in length and between 15 and 18.1 cm in width, and depict the tributary river systems of the Jialing River in modern Sichuan province. The areas covered by the seven maps overlap, but in total they cover 107 × 68 km in area.

== Tomb 5 ==
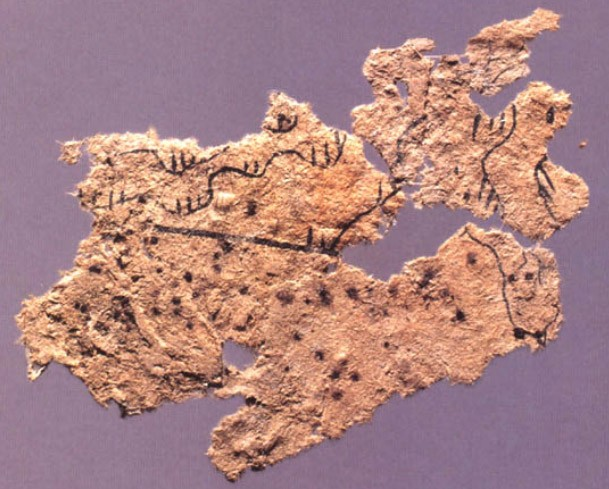
Fragment of the paper map from Tomb 5

Tomb 5, which was also excavated in 1986, dates to the early Western Han (early 2nd century BCE). The occupant of the tomb was buried with a paper map laid on his chest, but due to water damage only a single fragment (5.6 × 2.6 cm) of the map has survived. The map, which depicts topographic features such as mountains, waterways and roads, is drawn on the oldest extant piece of paper.

== Bibliography ==
- Behr, Wolfgang (2007), "Placed into the Right Position — Etymological Notes in Tu and Congeners", in Bray, Francesca; Dorofeeva-Lichtmann, Vera; Métailié, Georges (eds.), Graphics and Text in the Production of Technical Knowledge in China: The Warp and the Weft, Brill, ISBN 9789004160637
- Buisseret, David (1998), Envisioning the City: Six Studies in Urban Cartography, Chicago and London: University of Chicago Press, ISBN 0-226-07993-7.
- Harper, Donald (1999), "Warring States Natural Philosophy and Occult Thought", in Michael Loewe; Edward L. Shaughnessy (eds.), The Cambridge History of Ancient China: From the Origins of Civilization to 221 B.C., Cambridge: Cambridge University Press, pp. 813–884, ISBN 0-521-47030-7.
- Hsu, Hsin-mei Agnes (2009), "Structured Perceptions of Real and Imagined Landscapes in Early China", in Raaflaub, Kurt A.; Talbert, Richard J. A. (eds.), Geography and Ethnography: Perceptions of the World in Pre-Modern Societies, John Wiley & Sons, ISBN 9781444315660
- Yi, Xumei; Liu, Xiuwen (2010), "The calligraphy and printing cultural heritage of Gansu — the development of the engraved printing process and papermaking: an archaeological approach", in Allen, Susan M.; Lin, Zuzao; Cheng, Xiaolan; et al. (eds.), The History and Cultural Heritage of Chinese Calligraphy, Printing and Library Work, Walter de Gruyter, ISBN 9783598441790
