= José Daniel Rodrigues da Costa =

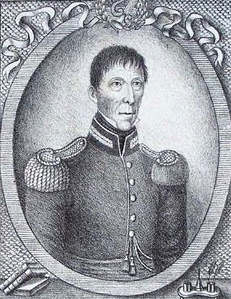
- Born: 31 October 1757; Leiria, Portugal
- Died: 7 October 1832 (aged 74); Lisbon, Portugal
- Occupation: Poet

José Daniel Rodrigues da Costa (31 October 1757–7 October 1832) was a Portuguese poet.
