= Popular print =

Western popular printed image

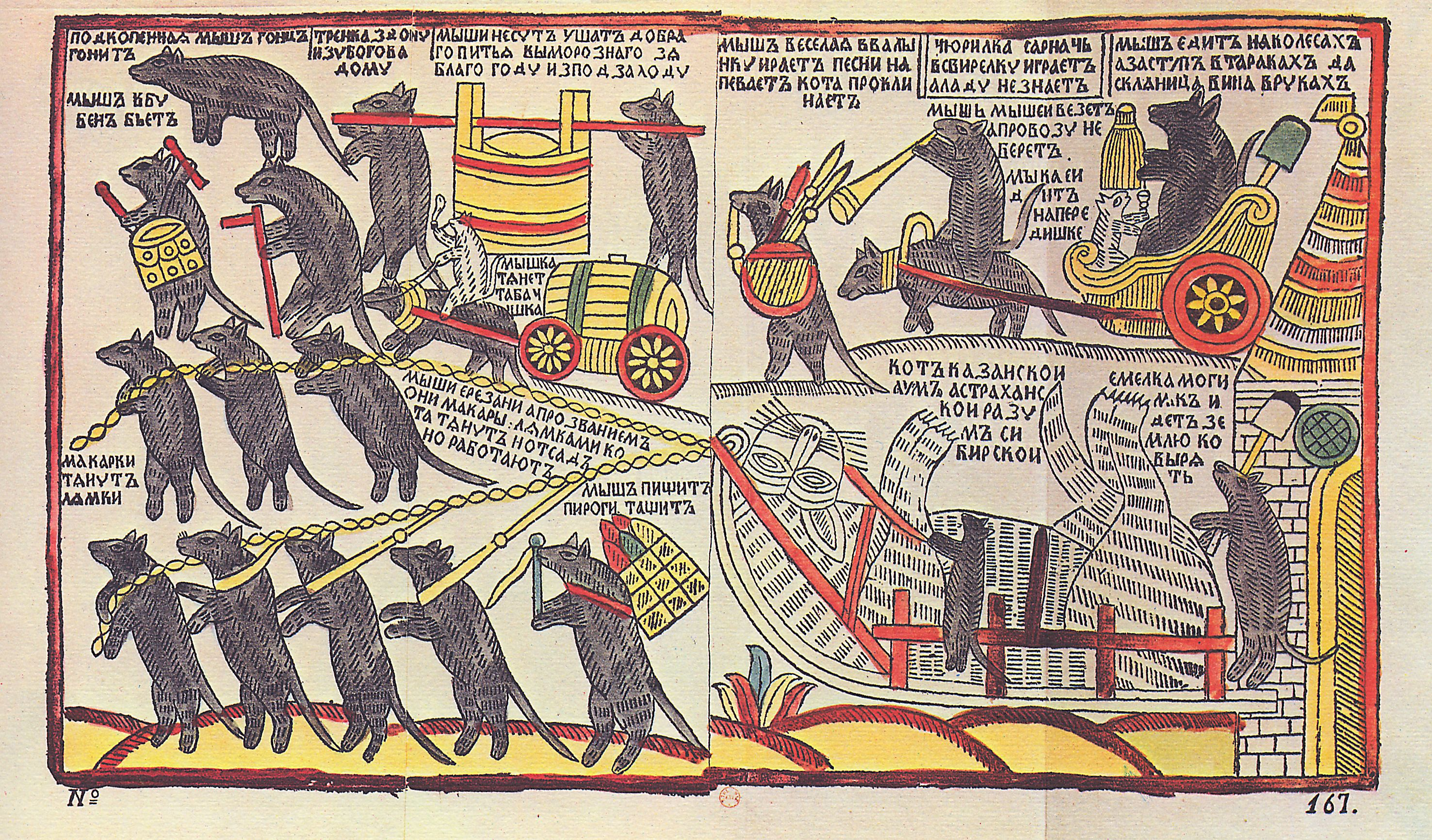
The Mice Burying the Cat, a 1760s Russian lubok hand-coloured woodcut. It probably originally dates from the reign of Peter the Great, but this impression probably dates from c. 1766. Possibly a satire on Peter's reforms, or just a representation of carnivalesque inversion, "turning the world upside down".

Popular prints is a term for printed images of generally low artistic quality which were sold cheaply in Europe and later the New World from the 15th to 18th centuries, often with text as well as images. They were some of the earliest examples of mass media. After about 1800, the types and quantity of images greatly increased, but other terms are usually used to categorise them.

== 15th century ==
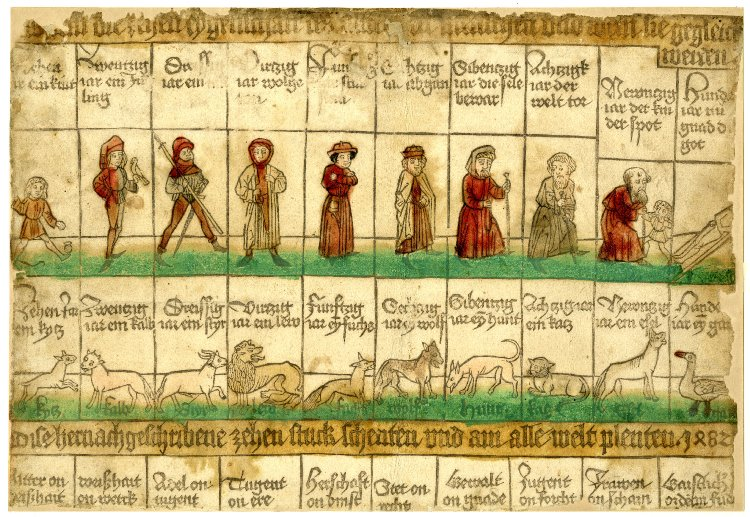
The Seven Ages of Man, German, 1482, British Museum

From about 1400, there began a "visual revolution that inundated Europe with images during the fifteenth century" (Field) as the woodcut technique was applied to paper, which was now manufactured in Christian Europe, instead of being imported from Islamic Spain. In the 15th century, the great majority of these images were religious, if playing cards are excluded. They were sold at churches, fairs and places of pilgrimage. Most were coloured, usually crudely, by hand or later by stencil. One political cartoon relating to events in 1468–1470 has survived in several different versions (many from years later). Old master print is a term that at this period includes popular prints, but later is restricted to more expensive and purely artistic prints.

Although early information as to prices is almost non-existent, it is clear from a number of sources that small woodcuts were affordable by at least the urban working-class, and much of the peasant class as well.

During the middle of the century, the quality of the images became typically very low, but there was an improvement towards the end, partly because it was necessary to keep pace with the quality of images in engravings. Engravings were always much more expensive to create, as they needed greater skill to create the plate, which would last for far fewer impressions than a woodcut. They did not come into the popular prints category until the 19th century, when different techniques made them much cheaper.

== 16th century ==
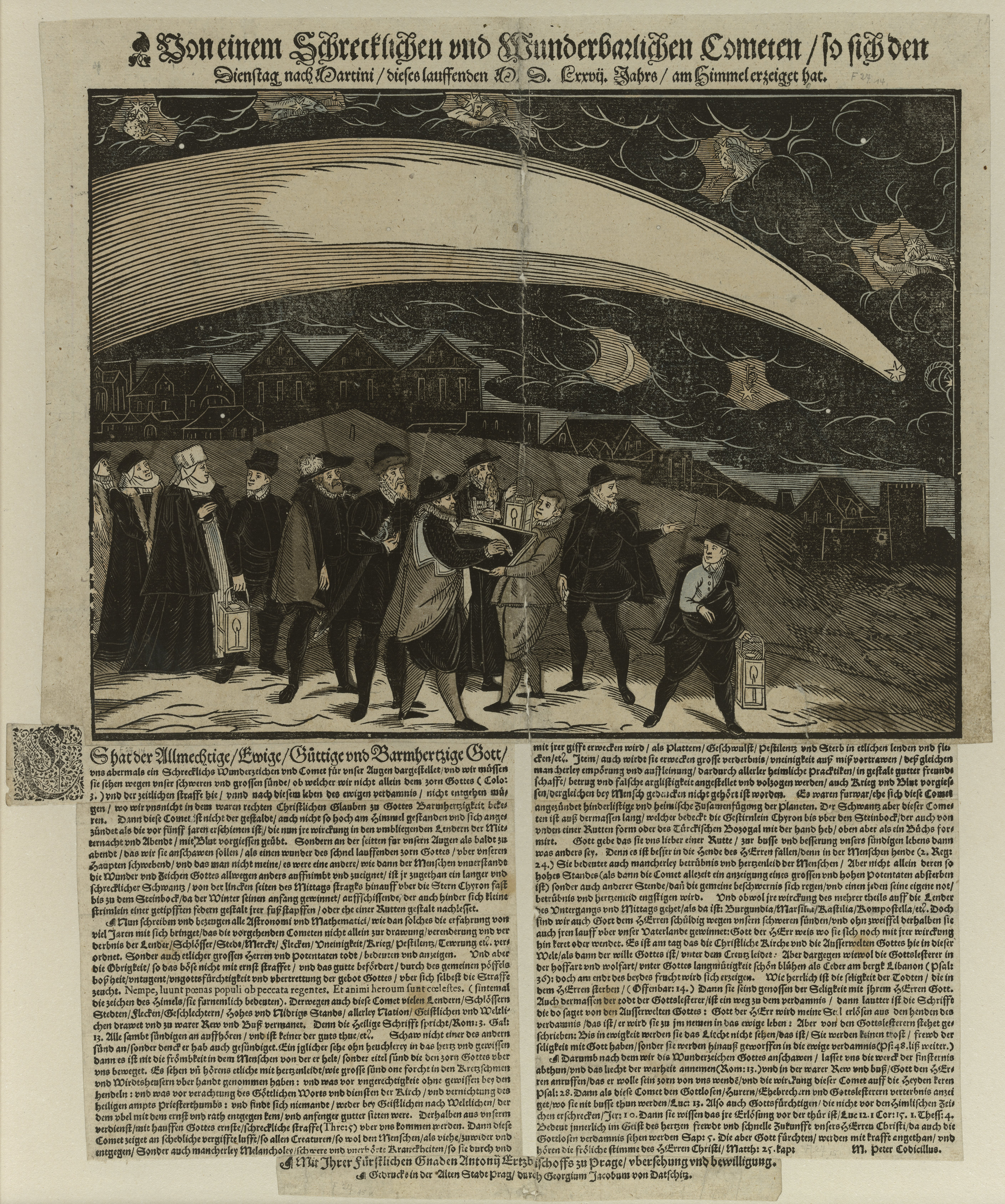
Der Große Komet über Prag, 12. November 1577, Zentralbibliothek Zürich

Broadsheets, also known as broadsides, were a common format. They were usually single sheets of paper of various sizes, typically sold by street-vendors. Another format was the chapbook, usually a single sheet cut or folded to make a small pamphlet or book. In Spain, there were pliegos, in Portugal the papel volante, and in other countries other names. These covered a great variety of material, including pictures, popular history, political comment or satire, news, almanacs (from c. 1470), poems and songs. They could be very influential politically, and were often subsidized by political factions for propaganda purposes. See Broadside (music) for their musical use. The Reformation hugely increased the market for satirical and polemical prints in all counties affected. In France the Wars of Religion, and in England the English Civil War and the political convulsions after the Restoration all produced huge quantities of propaganda and polemic, in images as well as text.

Despite being often issued in large numbers, their survival rate was extremely low, and they are now very rare, with most having not survived at all. This has been demonstrated by analysis of the records of the London Stationers Company from 1550 onwards; some blocks were in print for over a century with no copies now surviving. They were very commonly pasted to the walls of rooms. Paper was still sufficiently expensive that all available spare pieces tended to be used in the toilet. One of the biggest surviving collections with 439 prints is Wickiana at the Zentralbibliothek Zürich.

== After 1600 ==
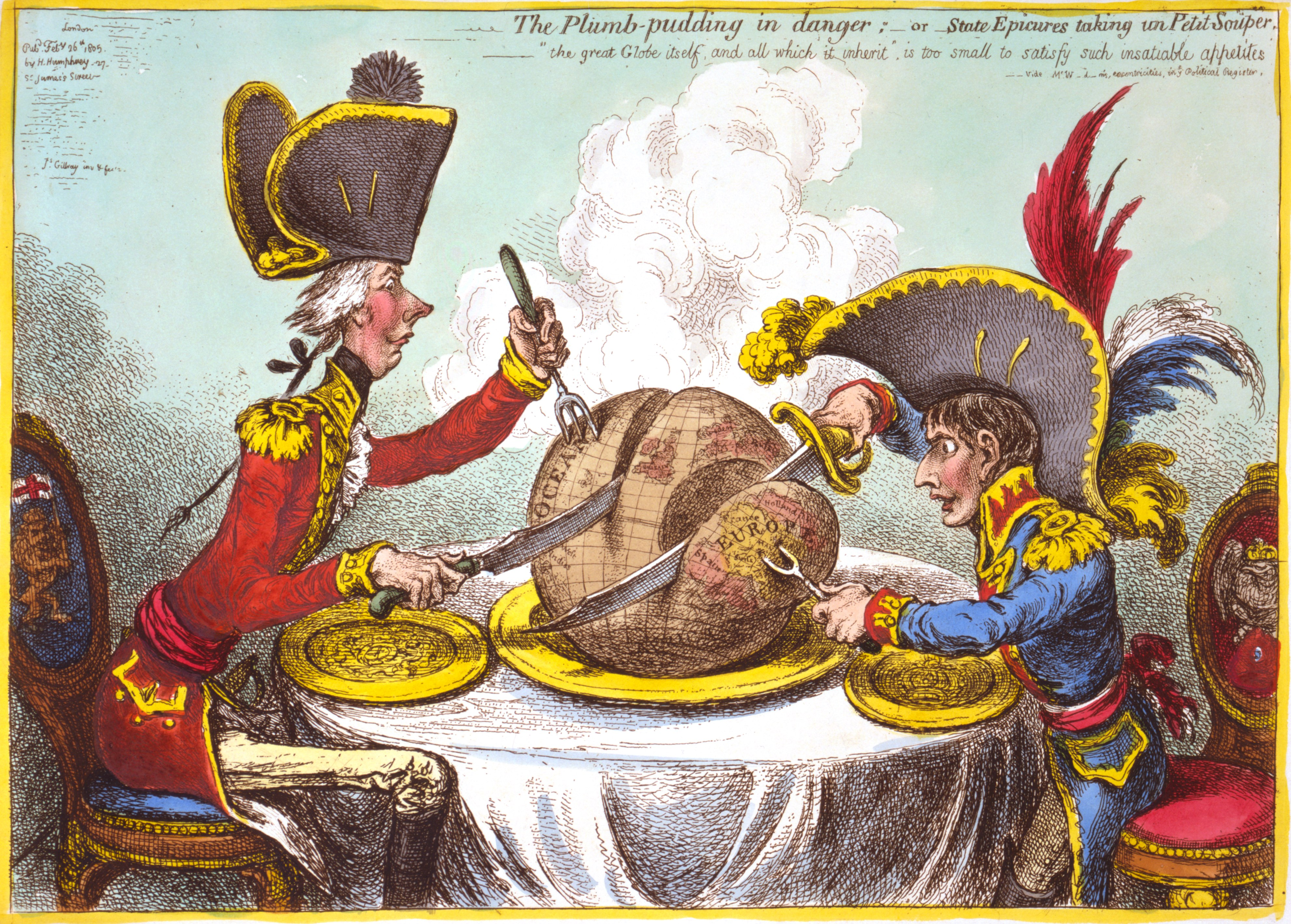
James Gillray's The Plumb-pudding in danger (1805), which caricatured Pitt and Napoleon, was voted the most famous of all UK political cartoons. Library of Congress

Newspapers began in the early 17th century as an upmarket and expensive form of broadsheet (still a term for a large-format newspaper). The first in English came in 1620. During this century, books also became much cheaper and began to replace some types of popular print. These trends continued during the next century, and although most of the traditional types of popular print lived on until the 19th century or beyond, they were by then part of a much wider print culture, and the term is generally not used of them. One type of publication continuing into the 20th century is the Brazilian cordel literature ("string literature" — it is hung on strings by the sellers) that continue to use woodcuts, and is part of a continuous tradition going back to the Portuguese papel volante of the 17th century. Lubok prints in Russia were another local variant.

Political caricature prints for sale as single sheets are found as early as the 15th century but reached the peak of their popularity in much of Europe in the 18th and early 19th century, before the form migrated into newspapers and magazines. Above all, they were popular in England, where a high degree of freedom of the press meant that dedicated print-shops, often also acting as the publishers, could openly sell and display scathing images of the Royal Family and government politicians, a business that had to remain "under the counter" in much of Europe.

== See also ==
- Old master prints, which covers artistic prints.
- Line engraving is also relevant.
- Printmaking for all the printmaking techniques.
