= List of protected species in Taiwan =

List of protected species in Taiwan.

In accordance with the Act on Wildlife Conservation, endangered and vulnerable species are classified into three categories:

- Endangered Species;
- Rare and Valuable Species;
- Other Conservation-Deserving Wildlife.

== Animals ==
=== Mammals ===
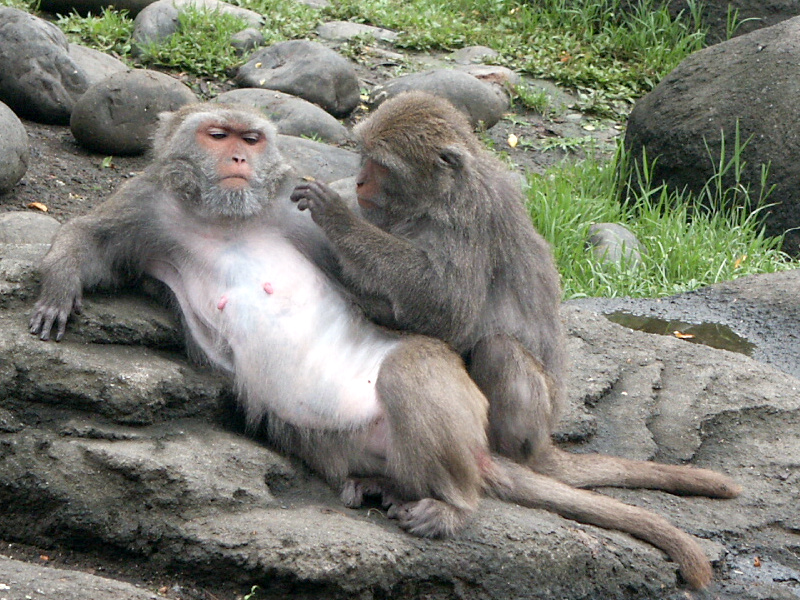
Formosan rock-monkey

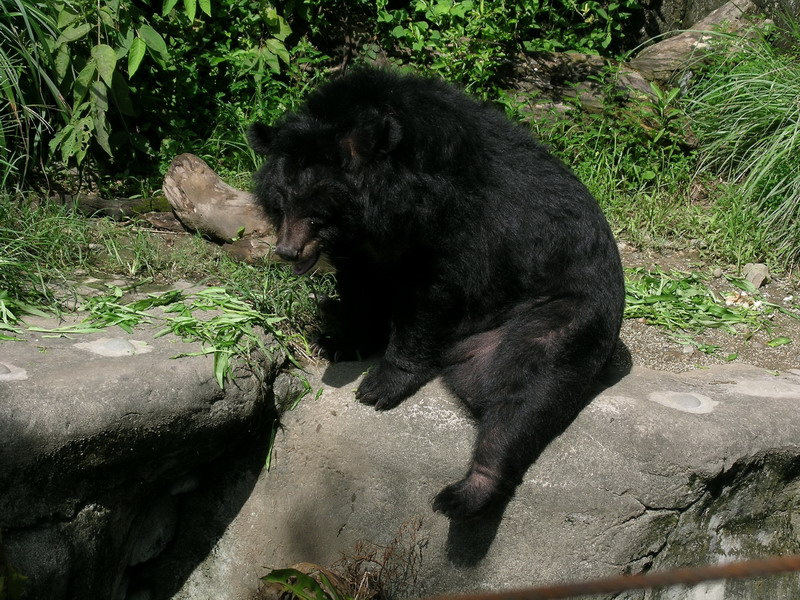
Formosan black bear

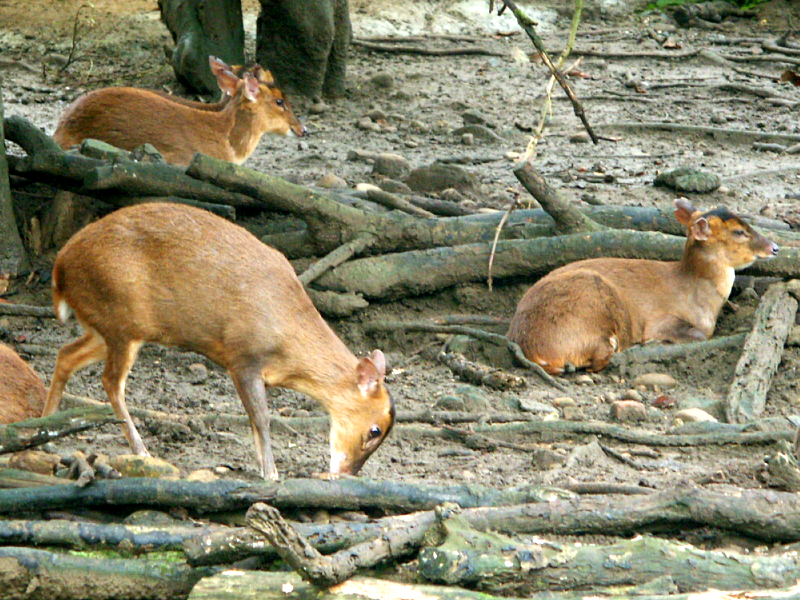
Formosan Reeve's muntjac

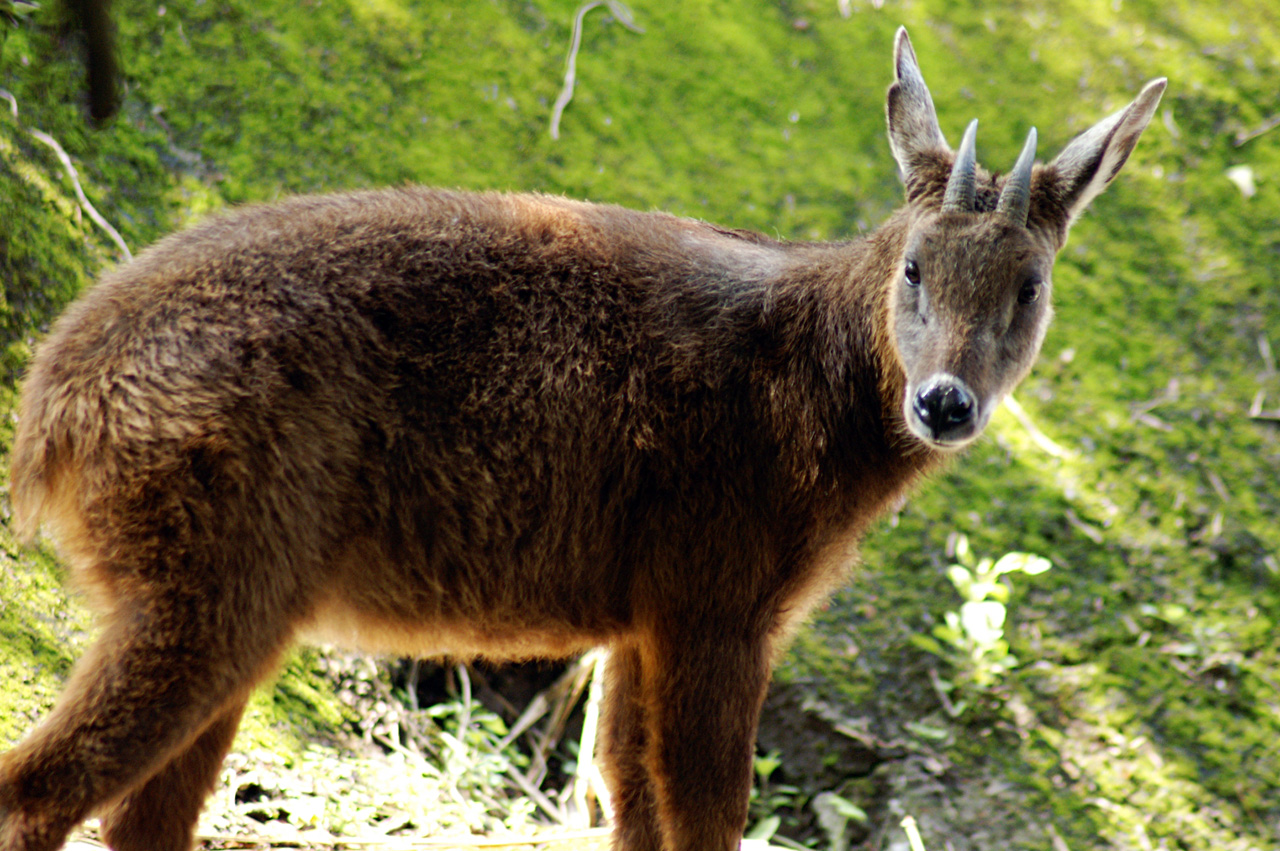
Formosan serow

Scientific name	English common name	Chinese common name	Status
Order Chiroptera
Pteropus dasymallus formosus	Formosan flying fox Formosan fruit bat	臺灣狐蝠	I
Order Primates
Family Cercopithecidae		獼猴科	
Macaca cyclopis	Formosan rock-monkey	臺灣獼猴	III
Order Pholidota
Manis pentadactyla pentadactyla	Formosan pangolin	臺灣鯪鯉	II
Order Cetacea
Family Delphinidae		海豚科	
Tursiops gilli	Pacific bottlenose dolphin	太平洋瓶鼻海豚	II
Tursiops aduncus	Indo-Pacific bottlenose dolphin	南方瓶鼻海豚	II
Order Carnivora
Ursus thibetanus formosanus	Formosan black bear	臺灣黑熊	I
Family Mustelidae		貂科	
Martes flavigula chrysospila	Formosan yellow-throated marten	黃喉貂	II
Lutra lutra chinensis	Chinese otter	水獺	I
Family Viverridae		靈貓科	
Herpestes urva	Crab-eating mongoose	棕簑貓	II
Paguma larvata taivana	Formosan gem-faced civet	白鼻心	II
Viverricula indica pallida	Small Chinese civet	麝香貓	II
Family Felidae		貓科	
Neofelis nebulosa brachyurus	Formosan clouded leopard	臺灣雲豹	I
Prionailurus bengalensis chinensis	Leopard cat	石虎	I
Order Artiodactyla
Family Cervidae		鹿科	
Cervus unicolor swinhoei	Formosan sambar	臺灣水鹿	II
Muntiacus reevesi micrurus	Formosan Reeve's muntjac	山羌	II
Family Bovidae		牛科	
Capricornis swinhoei	Formosan serow	臺灣長鬃山羊	II

=== Birds ===
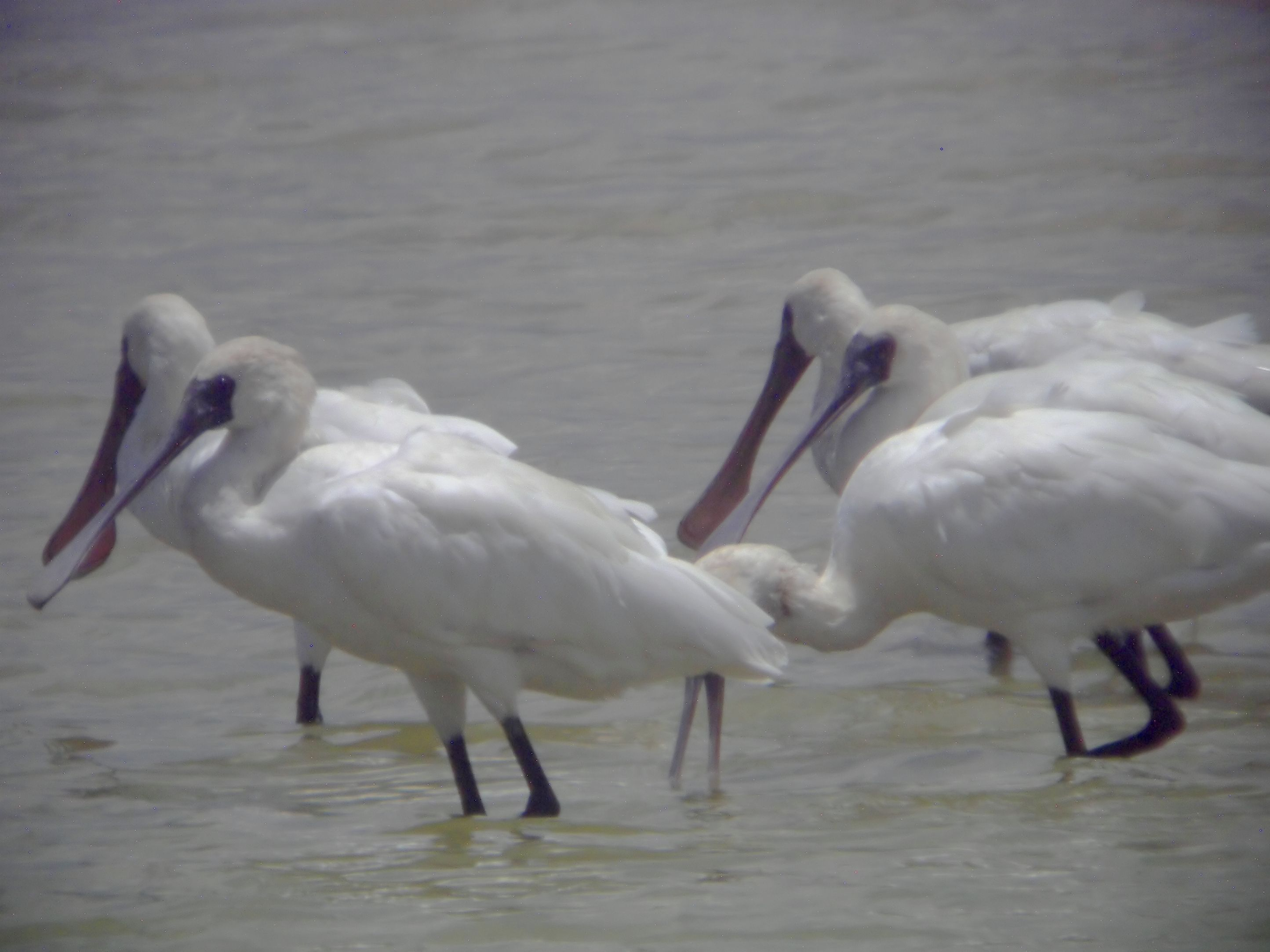
Black-faced spoonbill

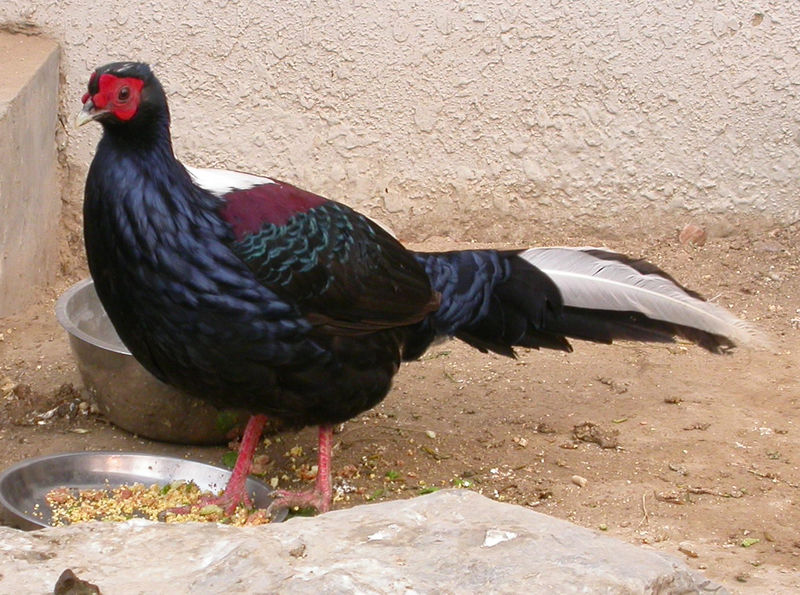
Swinhoe's pheasant

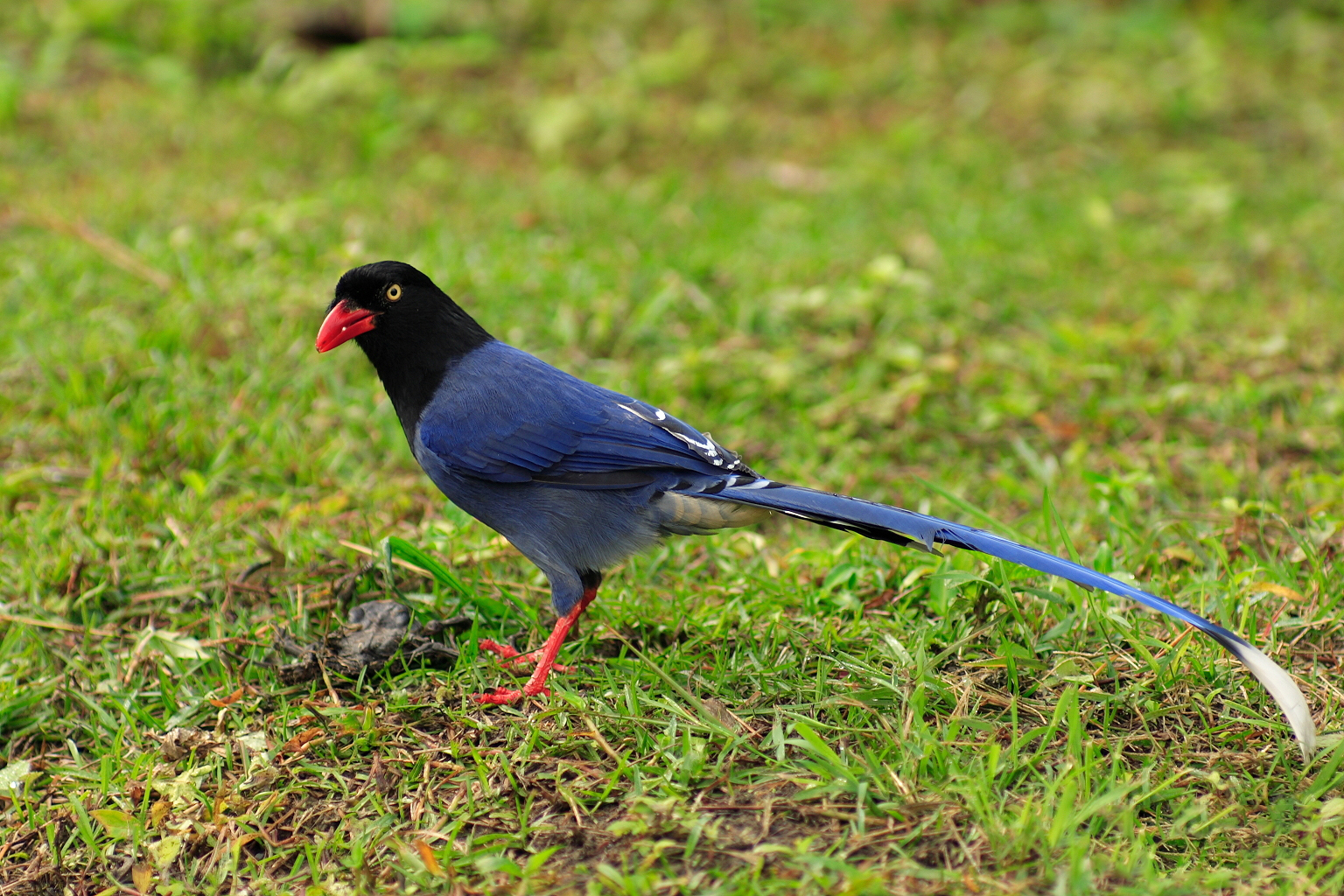
Formosan blue magpie

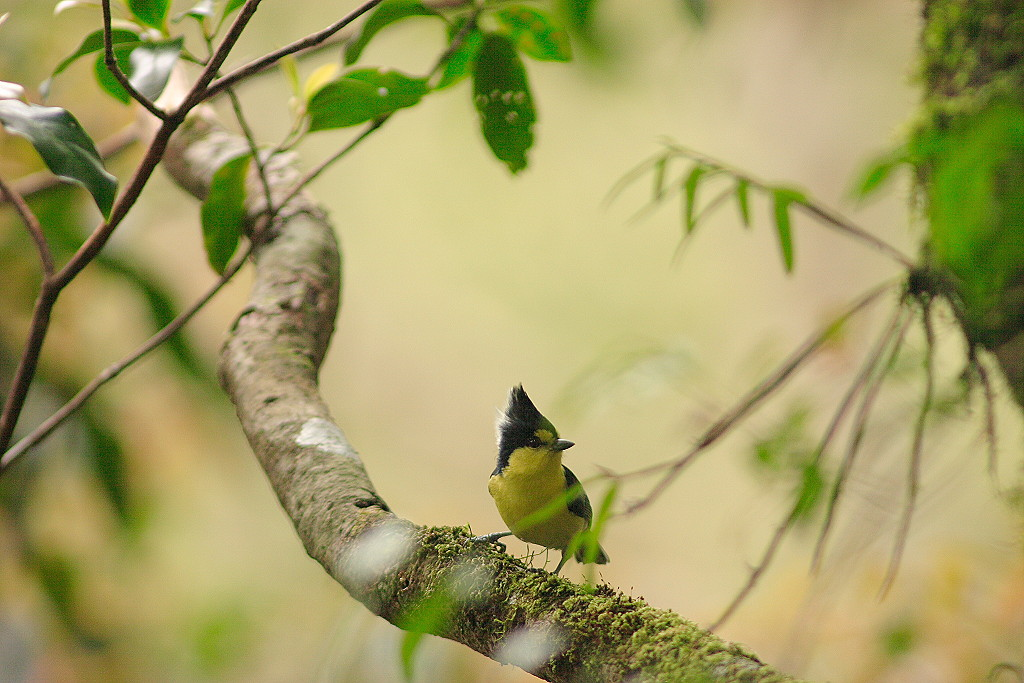
Formosan yellow tit

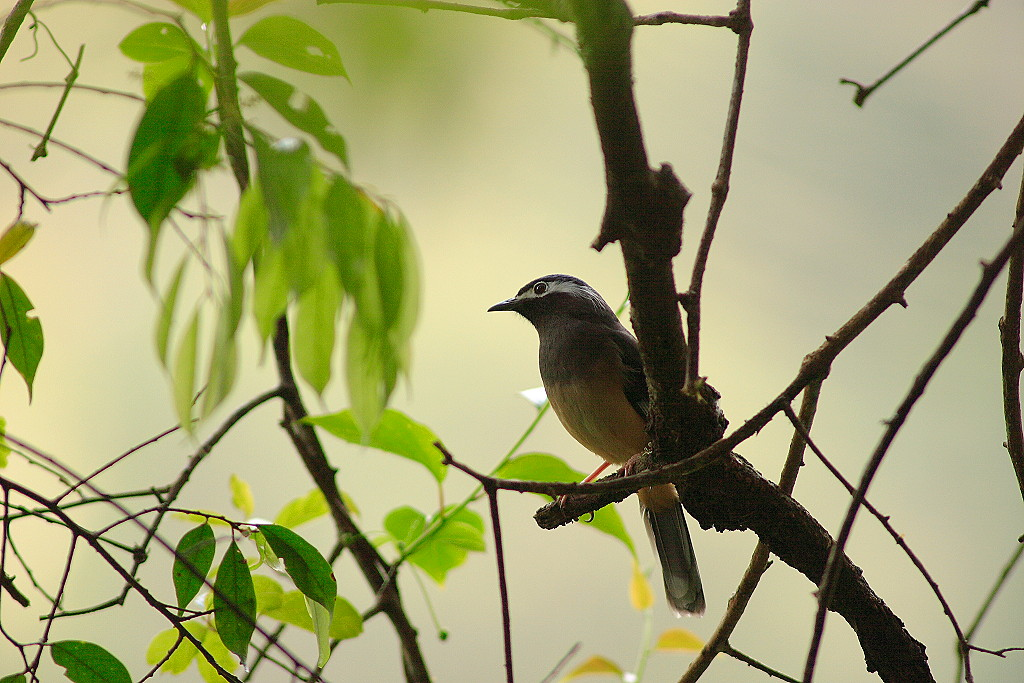
White-eared sibia

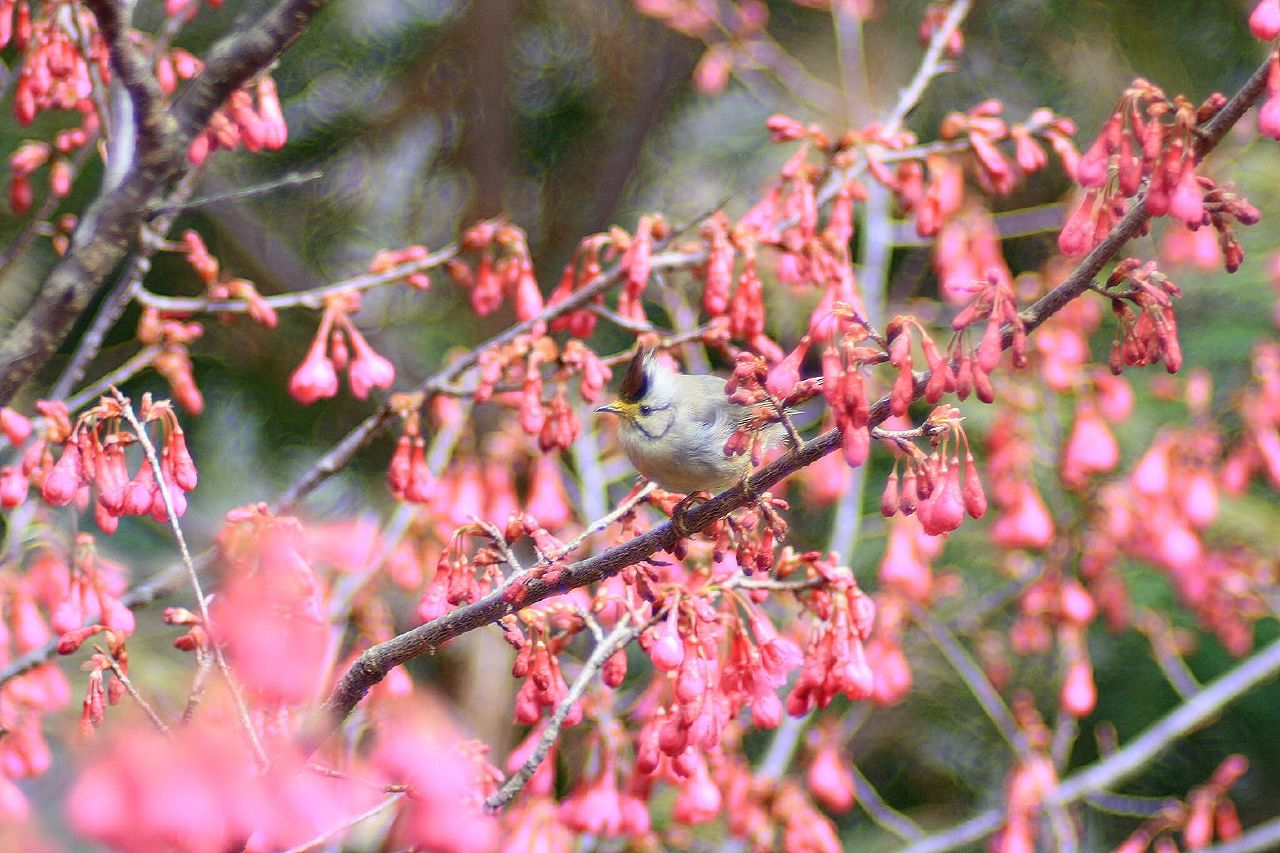
Formosan yuhina

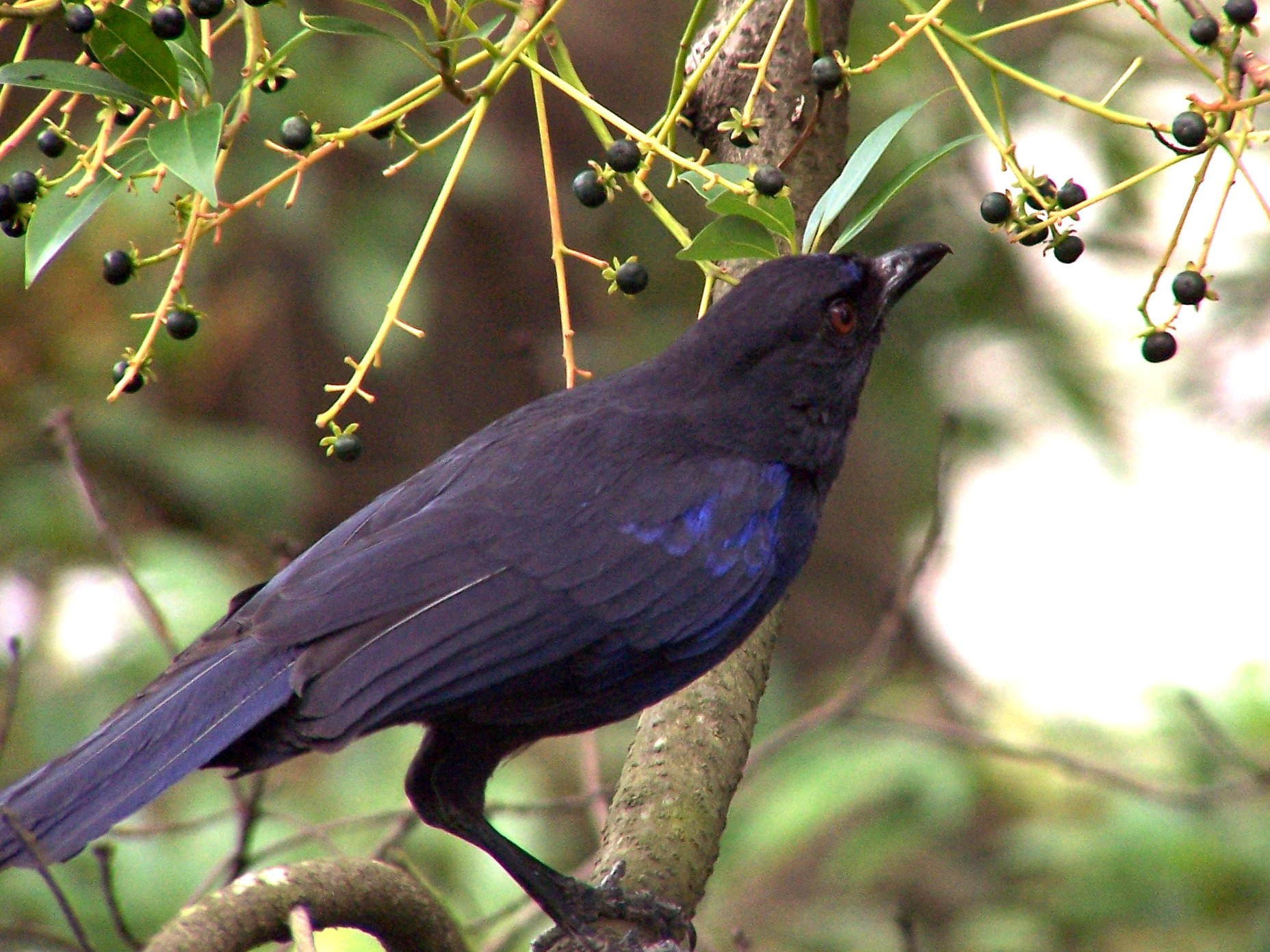
Formosan whistling thrush

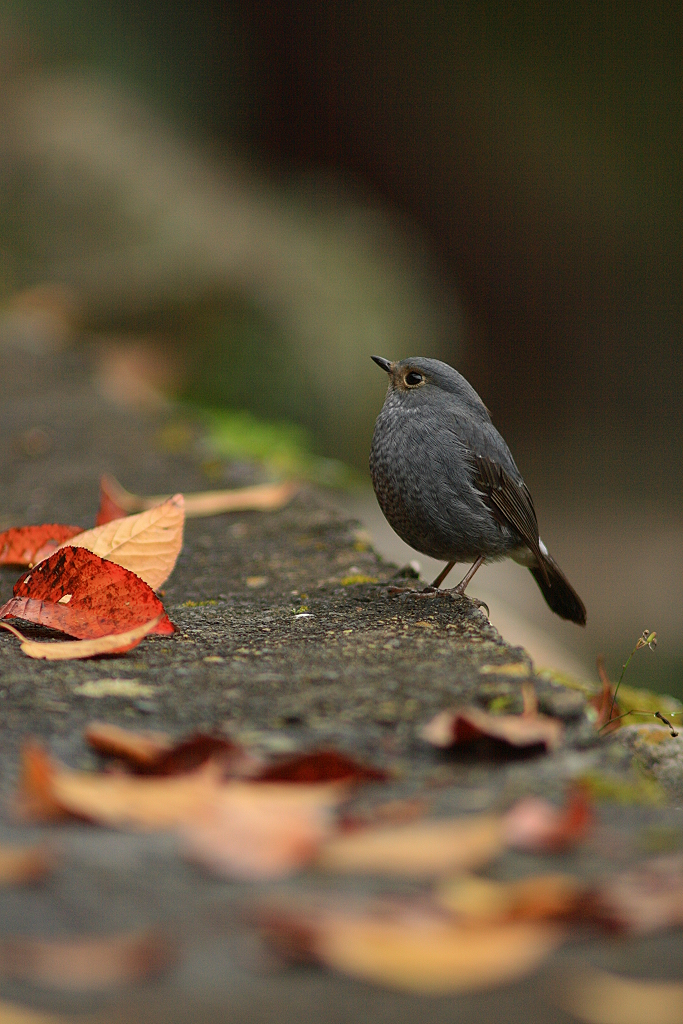
Plumbeous water redstart

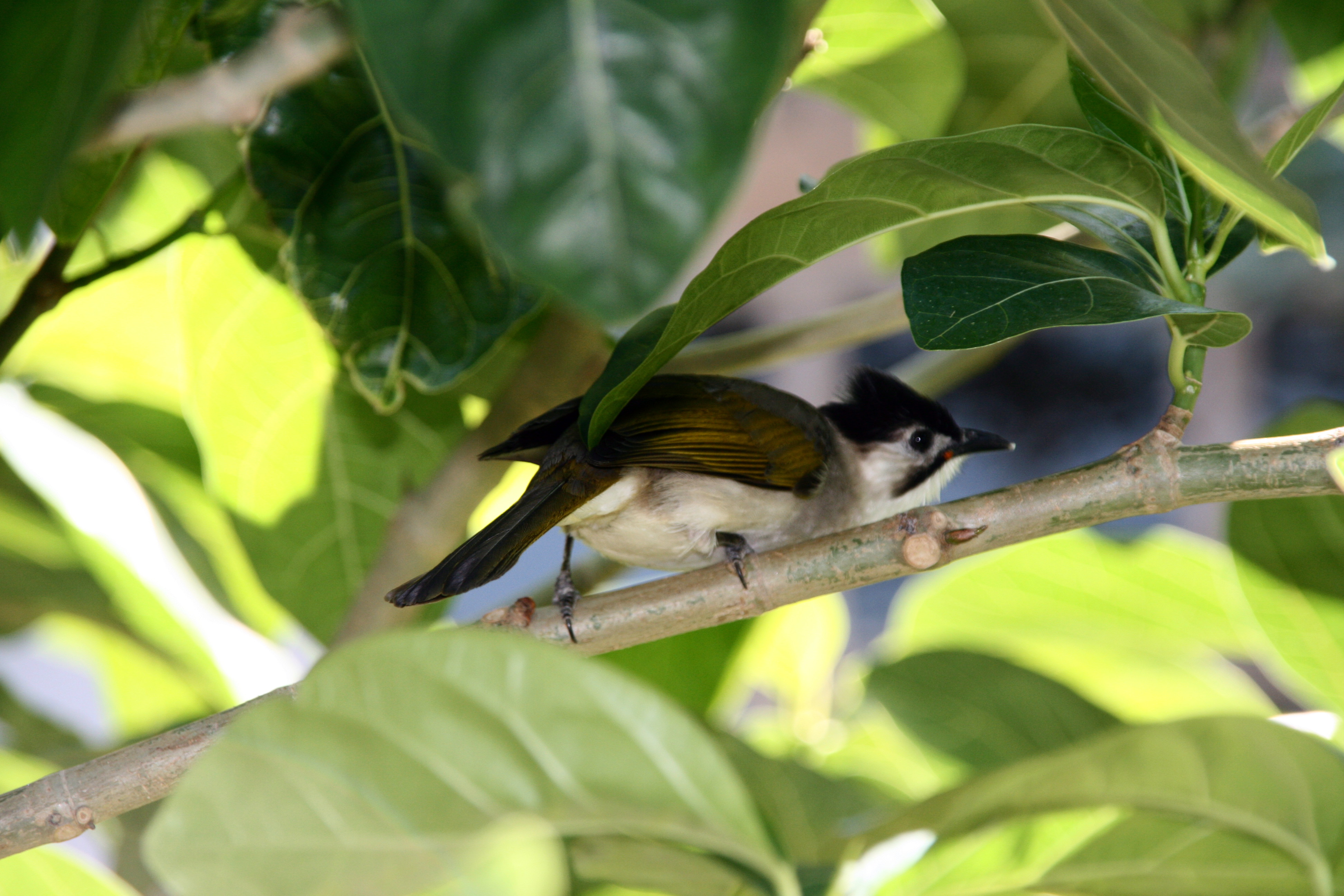
Formosan bulbul

Scientific name	English common name	Chinese common name	Status
Order Ciconiiformes
Family Ciconiidae		鸛科	
Ciconia boyciana	Oriental white stork	亞洲白鸛	I
Ciconia nigra	Black stork	黑鸛	II
Family Threskiornithidae		朱鷺科	
Platalea leucorodia	White spoonbill	琵鷺	I
Platalea minor	Black-faced spoonbill	黑面琵鷺	I
Threskiornis melanocephalus	Oriental ibis	黑頭白鷺	II
Family Ardeidae		鷺科	
Egretta eulophotes	Chinese egret	唐白鷺	II
Order Anseriformes
Family Anatidae		雁鴨科	
Aix galericulata	Mandarin duck	鴛鴦	II
Order Falconiformes
Family Accipitridae		鷲鷹科	
Accipiter soloensis	Grey frog hawk	赤腹鷹	II
Accipiter trivirgatus	Asian crested goshawk	鳳頭蒼鷹	II
Accipiter virgatus	Besra sparrow hawk	臺灣松雀鷹	II
Butastur indicus	Grey-faced buzzard-eagle	灰面鵟鷹	II
Ictinaetus malaiensis	Black eagle	林鵰	I
Pernis ptilorhynchus	Oriental honey buzzard	鵰頭鷹	II
Nisaetus nipalensis fokiensis	Hodgson's hawk eagle	赫氏角鷹	I
Spilornis cheela	Crested serpent eagle	大冠鷲	II
Family Falconidae		隼科	
Falco peregrinus	Peregrine falcon	隼	I
Family Pandionidae		鶚科	
Pandion haliaetus	Osprey	魚鷹	II
Order Galliformes
Family Phasianidae		雉科	
Arborophila crudigularis	White-throated hill partridge	深山竹雞	III
Lophura swinhoii	Swinhoe's pheasant	藍腹鷴	I
Phasianus colchicus	Common pheasant	環頸雉	II
Syrmaticus mikado	Mikado pheasant	黑長尾雉	I
Order Gruiformes
Family Gruidae		鶴科	
Grus grus	Common crane	灰鶴	II
Order Charadriiformes
Family Jacanidae		水雉科	
Hydrophasianus chirurgus	Pheasant-tailed jacana	水雉	II
Family Rostratulidae		彩鷸科	
Rostratula benghalensis	Painted snipe	彩鷸	II
Family Glareolidae		燕鴴科	
Glareola maldivarum	Eastern collared pratincole	燕鴴	II
Family Laridae		鷗科	
Anous stolidus	Common noddy	玄燕鷗	II
Sterna anaethetus	Bridled tern	白眉燕鷗	II
Sterna sumatrana	Black-naped tern	蒼燕鷗	II
Sterna albifrons	Little tern	小燕鷗	II
Order Columbiformes
Family Columbidae		鳩鴿科	
Chalcophaps indica	Emerald dove	翠翼鳩	II
Macropygia phasisnella	Large brown cuckoo dove	長尾鳩	II
Treron formosae	Formosan green pigeon	紅頭綠鳩	II
Order Strigiformes
Family Tytonidae		草鴞科	
Tyto capensis	Grass owl	草鴞	II
Family Strigidae		鴟鴞科	
Asio flammeus	Short-eared owl	短耳鴞	II
Asio otus	Long-eared owl	長耳鴞	II
Taenioptynx brodiei	Collared owlet	鵂鶹	II
Bubo flavipes	Tawny fish owl	黃魚鴞	I
Ninox scutulata	Brown boobook	褐鷹鴞	II
Otus bakkamoena	Collared scops owl	領角鴞	II
Otus elegans botelensis	Riukiu scops owl	蘭嶼角鴞	I
Otus spilocephalus	Spotted scops owl	黃嘴角鴞	II
Strix leptogrammica caligata	Brown wood owl	褐林鴞	I
Strix aluco yamadae	Eurasian tawny owl	灰林鴞	I
Order Piciformes
Family Picidae		啄木鳥科	
Dendrocopos leucotos	White-backed woodpecker	大赤啄木	II
Picus canus	Grey-faced woodpecker	綠啄木	II
Order Passeriformes
Family Corvidae		鴉科	
Garrulus glandarius	Jay	橿鳥	III
Pica serica	Oriental magpie	喜鵲	III
Urocissa caerulea	Formosan blue magpie	臺灣藍鵲	II
Family Oriolidae		黃鸝科	
Oriolus traillii ardens	Maroon oriole	朱鸝	I
Oriolus chinensis	Black-naped oriole	黃鸝	II
Family Paridae		山雀科	
Aegithalos concinnus	Red-headed tit	紅頭山雀	III
Parus ater	Coal tit	煤山雀	III
Parus holsti	Formosan yellow tit	黃山雀	II
Parus monticolus	Green-backed tit	青背山雀	II
Parus varius	Varied tit	赤腹山雀	II
Family Pittidae		八色鳥科	
Pitta brachyura	Blue-winged pitta	八色鳥	II
Family Muscicapidae		鶲科	
Ficedula hyperythra	Snowy-browed flycatcher	黃胸青鶲	III
Niltava vivida	Vivid niltava	黃腹琉璃	III
Terpsiphone atrocaudata	Black paradise flycatcher	綬帶鳥	II
Family Timaliidae		畫眉科	
Actinodura morrisoniana	Formosan barwing	紋翼畫眉	III
Garrulax albogularis	White-throated laughingthrush	白喉笑鶇	II
Garrulax canorus taiwannus	Melodious laughing thrush	畫眉	II
Garrulax morrisonianus	Formosan laughing thrush	金翼白眉	III
Garrulax poecilorhynchus	Rufous laughing thrush	竹鳥	II
Heterophasia auricularis	White-eared sibia	白耳畫眉	III
Liocichla steerii	Steere's liocichla	藪鳥	III
Yuhina brunneiceps	Formosan yuhina	冠羽畫眉	III
Family Campephagidae		山椒鳥科	
Coracina novaehollandiae	Black-faced cuckooshrike	花翅山椒鳥	II
Pericrocotus divaricatus	Ashy minivet	灰山椒鳥	II
Pycnonotus solaris	YelIow-throated minivet	紅山椒鳥	III
Family Turdidae		鶇科	
Brachyptery montana	Blue shortwing	小翼鶇	III
Cinclidium leucurum	White-tailed blue robin	白尾鴝	III
Enicurus scouleri	Little forktail	小剪尾	II
Myophonus insularis	Formosan whistling thrush	臺灣紫嘯鶇	III
Tarsiger johnstoniae	Collared bush robin	阿里山鴝	III
Turdus poliocephalus niveiceps	Taiwan island thrush	白頭鶇	III
Rhyacornis fuliginosus	Plumbeous water redstart	鉛色水鶇	III
Family Sylviidae		鶯科	
Regulus goodfellowi	Taiwan firecrest	火冠戴菊鳥	III
Family Laniidae		伯勞科	
Lanius cristatus	Brown shrike	紅尾伯勞	III
Family Pycnonotidae		鵯科	
Pycnonotus taivanus	Formosan bulbul	烏頭翁	III

=== Reptiles ===
Taiwan beauty snake

Scientific name	English common name	Chinese common name	Status
Order Testudinata
Family Emydidae		澤龜科	
Mauremys mutica	Asian yellow pond turtle	柴棺龜	II
Cuora flavomarginata	Yellow-lined box turtle / Yellow-margined box turtle	食蛇龜	II
Geoclemys reevesii	Chinese three-keeled pond turtle	金龜	II
Family Cheloniidae		蠵龜科	
Caretta caretta gigas	Loggerhead turtle	赤蠵龜	I
Chelonia mydas japonica	Green turtle	綠蠵龜	I
Eretmochelys imbricata squamata	Hawksbill turtle	玳瑁	I
Family Dermochelyidae		革龜科	
Dermochelys coriacea	Leatherback sea turtle	革龜	I
Order Squamata
Family Gekkonidae		守宮科	
Gekko kikuchii	Kikuchi's gecko	蘭嶼守宮	II
Hemiphyllodactylus typus	Indo-Pacific tree gecko	半葉趾蝎虎	II
Lepidodactylus yami	Yami scaly-toed gecko / Lanyu scaly-toed gecko	雅美鱗趾蝎虎	II
Family Lacertidae		蜥蝪科	
Takydromus stejnegeri	Stejneger's grass lizard / Brown grass lizard	蓬萊草蜥	II
Takydromus sauteri	Sauter's grass lizard	南臺草蜥	II
Takydromus formosanus	Formosan grass lizard	臺灣草蜥	II
Takydromus hsuehshanensis	Hsuehshan grass lizard	雪山草蜥	II
Platyplacopus kuehnei	Kuhne's grass lizard	臺灣地蜥	II
Family Scincidae		石龍子科	
Scincella formosensis	Formosan smooth skink	臺灣滑蜥	II
Sphenomorphus taiwanensis	Taiwan alpine skink	臺灣蜓蜥	II
Family Anguidae		蛇蜥科	
Ophisaurus harti	Hart's glass lizard	蛇蜥	II
Ophisaurus formosensis	Formosan glass lizard	臺灣蛇蜥	II
Family Colubridae		黃頜蛇科	
Pareas formosensis	Taiwan slug snake	臺灣鈍頭蛇	II
Achalinus niger	Black burrowing snake	標蛇	II
Natrix swinhonis	Swinhoe's grass water snake	斯文豪氏遊蛇	II
Natrix tigrina formosana	Asian tiger snake	臺灣赤煉蛇	II
Natrix miyajimae	Taipei ground snake	金絲蛇	II
Elaphe poryphyracea	Red bamboo snake / Red bamboo rat snake	紅竹蛇	II
Elaphe mandarina takasago	Mandarin rat snake	高砂蛇	II
Elaphe taeniura friesei	Taiwan beauty snake / Striped racer	錦蛇	II
Family Elapidae		蝙蝠蛇科	
Bungarus multicinctus multicinctus	Banded krait / Taiwan umbrella snake	雨傘節	II
Naja atra	Taiwan spectacle cobra	眼鏡蛇	II
Hemibungarus sauteri sauteri	Taiwan coral snake / Striped red snake	帶紋赤蛇	II
Calliophis macclellandi formosensis	Asia coral snake / Red-ringed snake	環紋赤蛇	II
Family Viperidae		蝮蛇科	
Agkistrodon acutus	Hundred pace snake / Chinese moccasin	百步蛇	I
Protobothrops mucrosquamatus	Pointed-scaled pit viper / Formosan pit viper / Taiwan habu	龜殼花	II
Ovophis monticola orjentalis	Alishan turtle-designed snake	阿里山龜殼花	II
Trimeresurus gracilis	Kikuchi's turtle-designed snake / Taiwan mountain pitviper	菊池氏龜殼花	II
Vipera russellii	Russell's viper	鎖蛇	II

=== Amphibians ===
Scientific name	English common name	Chinese common name	Status
Order Caudata
Family Hynobiidae		山椒魚科	
Hynobius formosanus	Formosan salamander	臺灣山椒魚	II
Hynobius sonani	Sonan's salamander	楚南氏山椒魚	II
Order Anura
Family Rhacophoridae		樹蛙科	
Rhacophorus taipeianus	Taipei green tree frog	臺北樹蛙	II
Rhacophorus smaragdinus	Emerald green tree frog	翡翠樹蛙	II
Rhacophorus moltrechti	Moltrecht's green tree frog	莫氏樹蛙	II
Rhacophorus robustus	Brown tree frog	褐樹蛙	II
Family Microhylidae		狹口蛙科	
Microhyla heymonsi	Heymonsi's rice frog	黑蒙西氏小雨蛙	II
Microhyla butleri	Butler's pigmy frog	巴氏小雨蛙	II
Micryletta steinegeri	Stejneger's paddy frog	史丹吉氏小雨蛙	II
Family Ranidae		赤蛙科	
Rana taipehensis	Taipei frog / Two-striped grass frog	臺北赤蛙	II
Rana tigerina rugulosa	Chinese bullfrog	虎皮蛙	II
Rana guntheri	Guenther's frog	貢德氏蛙	II

=== Fishes ===
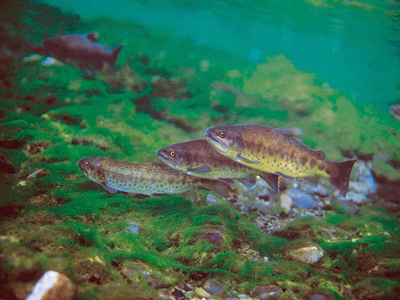
Formosan landlocked salmon

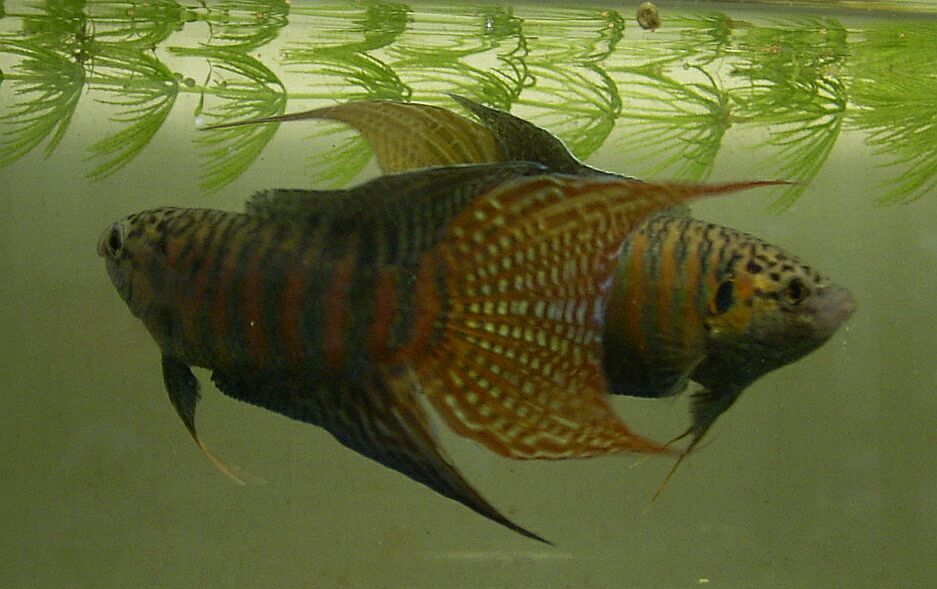
Paradise fish

Scientific name	English common name	Chinese common name	Status
Order Anguilliformes
Family Anguillidae		鰻鱺科	
Anguilla marmorata	Giant mottled eel	鱸鰻	II
Order Salmoniformes
Family Salmonidae		鮭科	
Oncorhynchus masou formosanus	Formosan landlocked salmon / Taiwan trout	櫻花鉤吻鮭	I
Order Cypriniformes
Family Cyprinidae		鯉科	
Varicorhinus alticorpus	Deep-body shovelnose minnow	高身鏟頜魚	I
Family Homalopteridae		平鰭鰍科	
Hemimyzon taitungensis	Ray-finned fish	臺東間爬岩鰍	II
Sinogastromyzon puliensis	Ray-finned fish	埔里中華爬岩鰍	II
Order Perciformes
Family Anabntidae		鬥魚科	
Macropodus opercularis	Paradise fish	臺灣鬥魚	II

=== Crustaceans ===
Scientific name	English common name	Chinese common name	Status
Order Decapoda
Family Coenobitidae		陸寄居蟹科	
Birgus latro	Coconut crab	椰子蟹	II

=== Insects ===
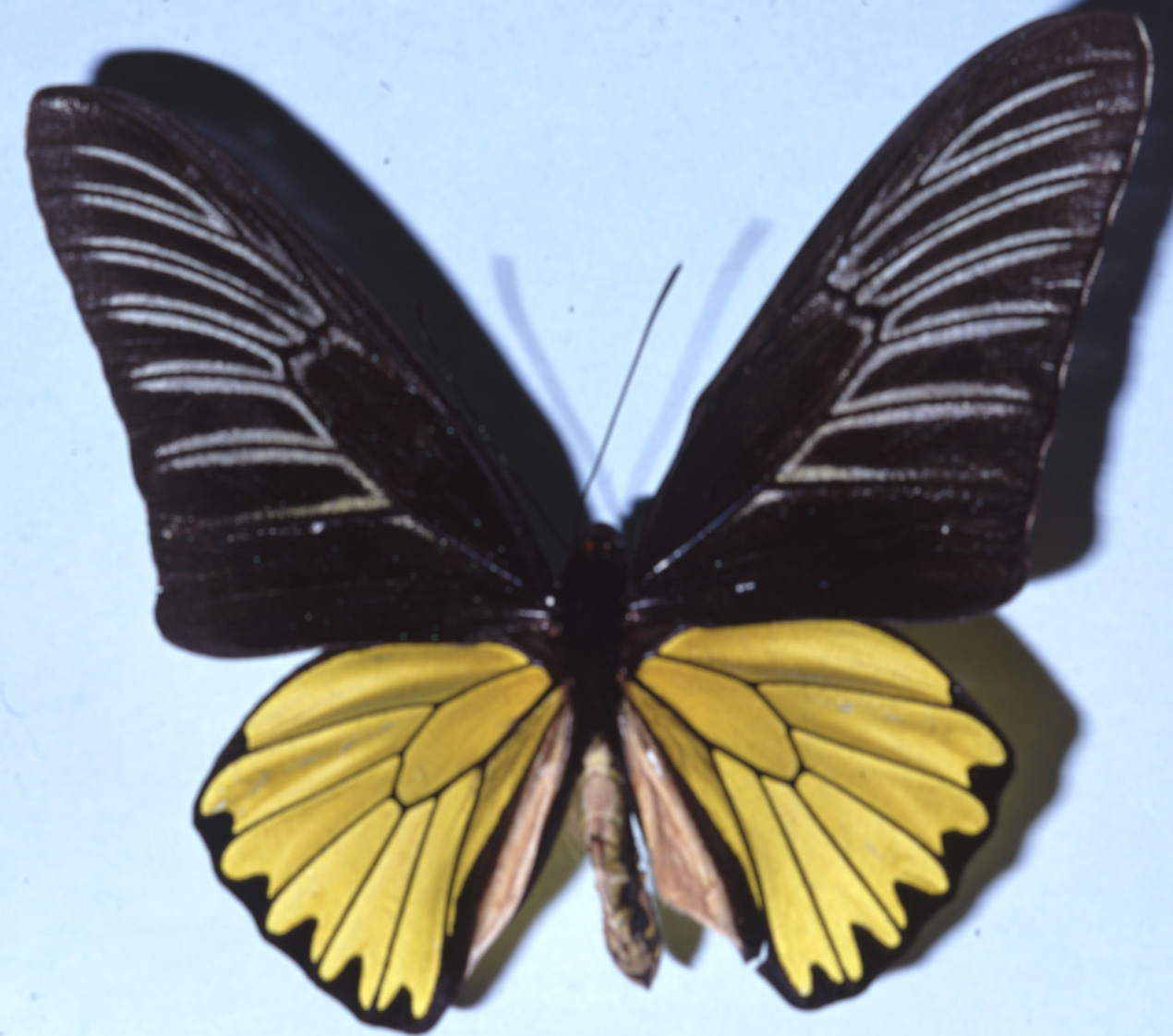
Magellan's iridescent birdwing

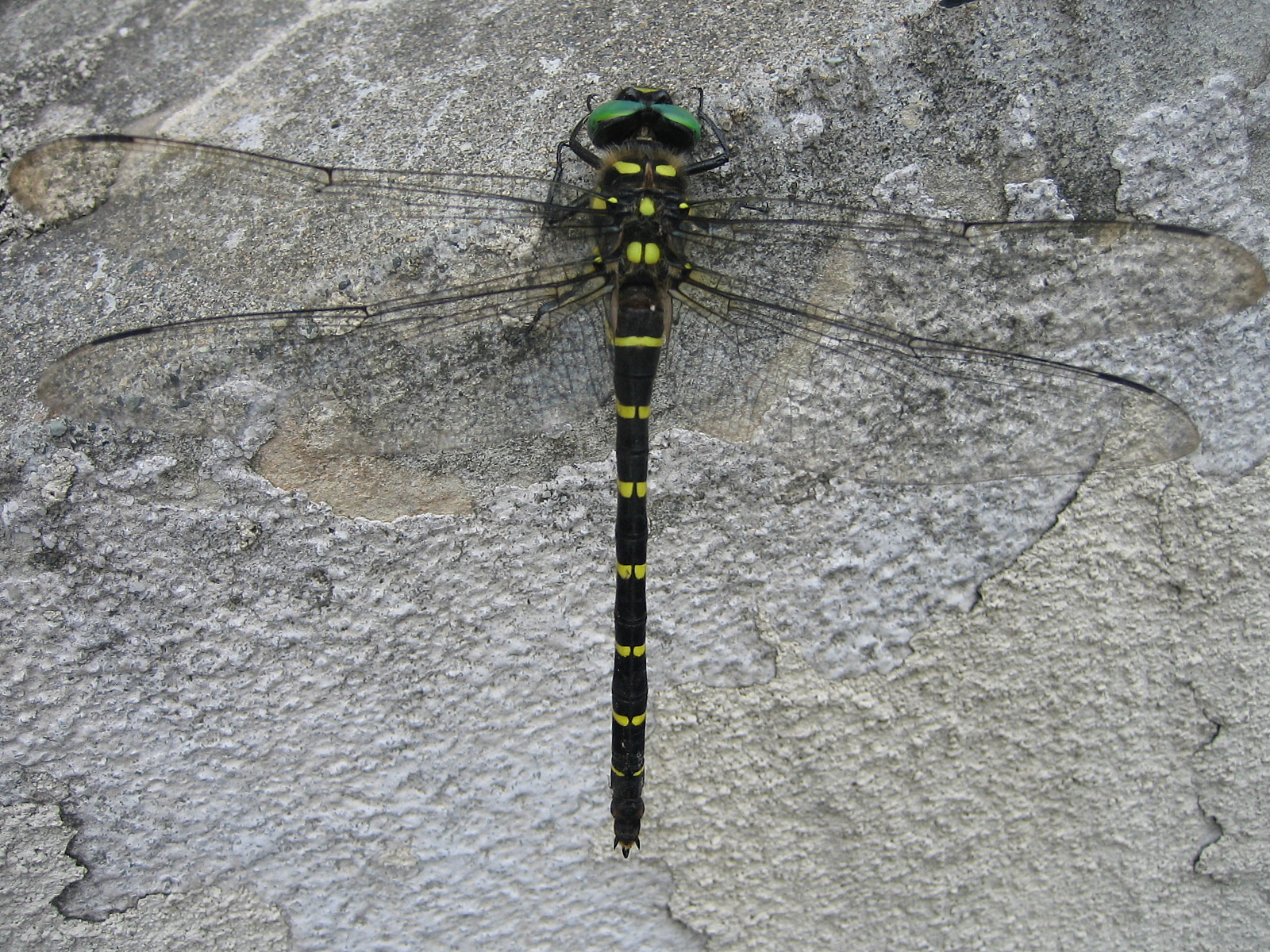
Siebold's dragonfly

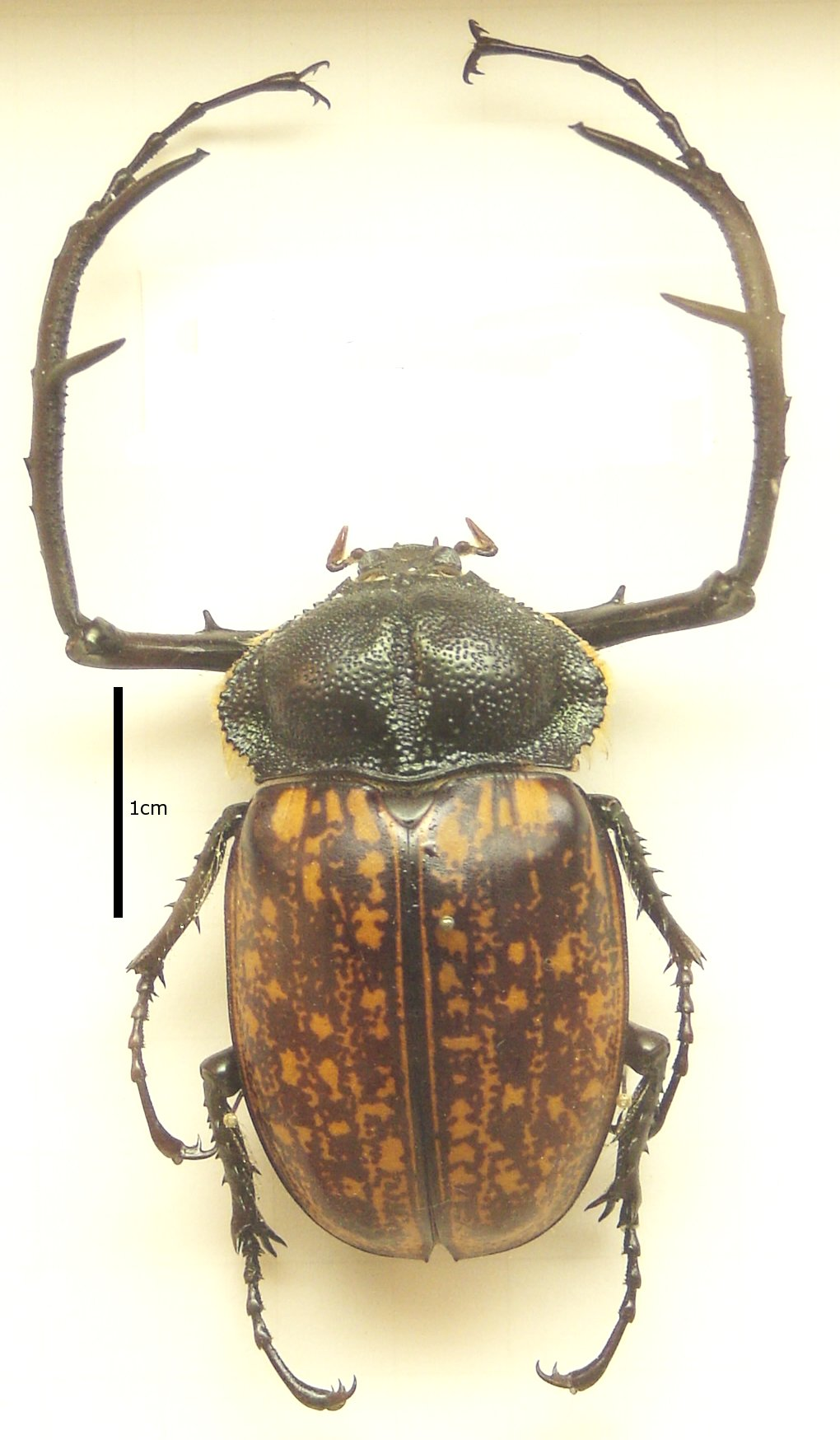
Long-armed scarab

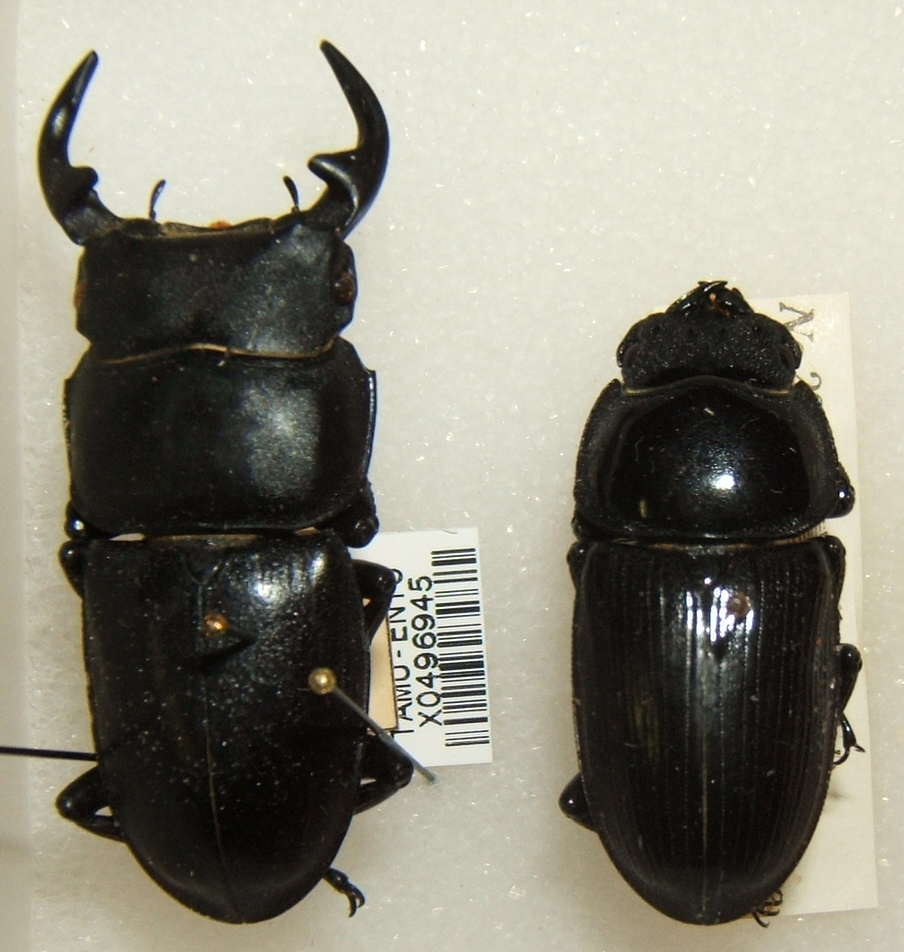
Giant stag beetle

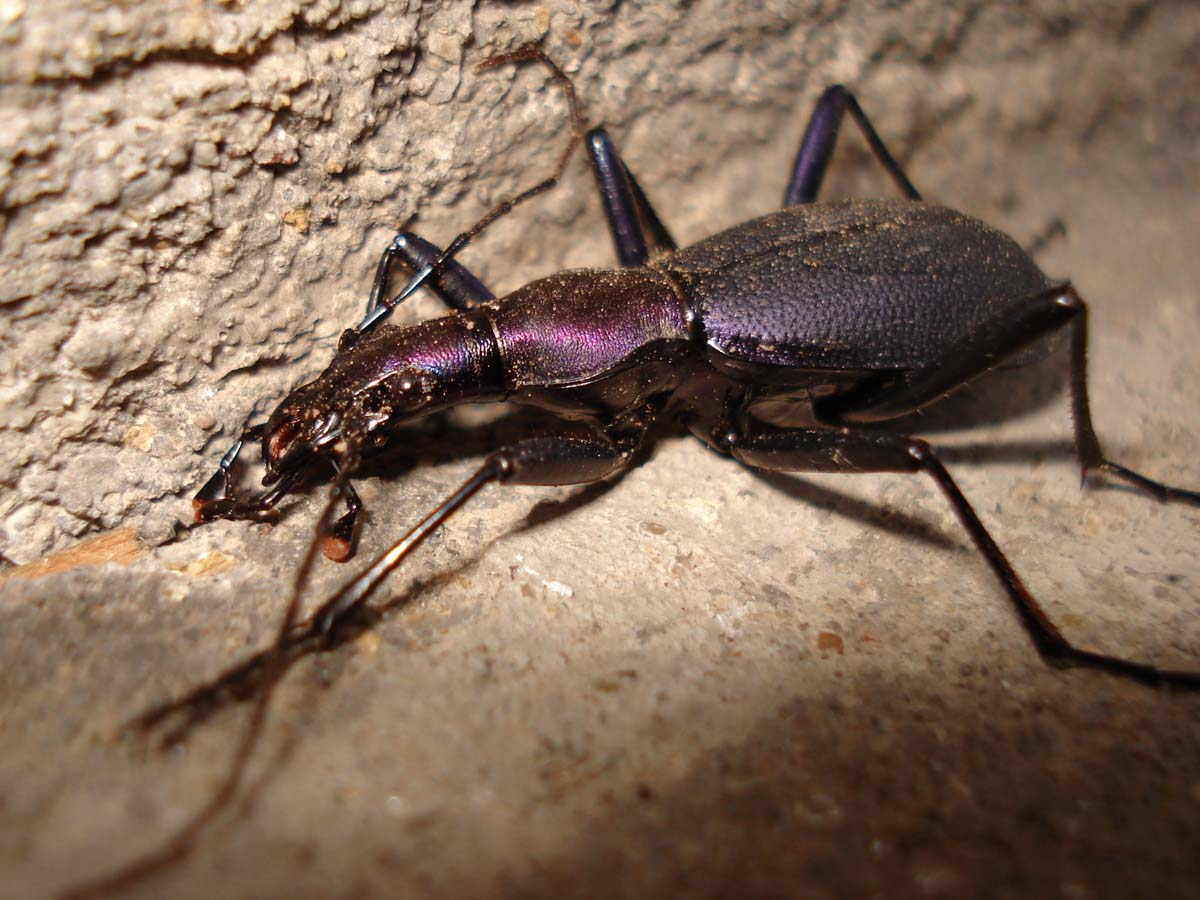
Snail-eating ground beetle

Scientific name	English common name	Chinese common name	Status
Order Lepidoptera
Family Papilionoidae		鳳蝶科	
Agehana maraho	Taiwan broad-tailed swallowtail	寬尾鳳蝶	I
Atrophaneura horishana	Aurora swallowtail / Highland red-bellied swallowtail	曙鳳蝶	II
Troides magellanus	Magellan's iridescent birdwing	珠光鳳蝶	I
Troides aeacus kaguya	Hengchun birdwing	黃裳鳳蝶	II
Family Nymphalidae		蛺蝶科	
Sasakia charonda formosana	Great purple emperor (fritillary)	大紫蛺蝶	I
Order Hemiptera
Family Cicadidae		蟬科	
Formotosema siebohmi	Formosan giant cicada	臺灣爺蟬	II
Order Odonata
Family Cordulegasteridae		勾蜓科	
Anotogaster sieboldii	Jambo dragonfly / Siebold's dragonfly	無霸勾蜓	II
Order Coleoptera
Family Buprestidae		吉丁蟲科	
Buprestis mirabilis	Brilliant jewel beetle	妖艷吉丁蟲	II
Family Elateridae		叩頭蟲科	
Campsosternus gemma	Rainbow sheath click beetle	彩虹叩頭蟲	II
Family Scarabaeidae		金龜蟲科	
Cheirotonus macleayi formosanus	Formosan long-armed scarab	臺灣長臂金龜	II
Family Lucanidae		鍬形蟲科	
Dorcus formosanus	Formosan giant stag beetle	臺灣大鍬形蟲	II
Dorcus schenklingi	Formosan long-fanged stag beetle	長角大鍬形蟲	II
Family Cerambycidae		天牛科	
Neocerambyx oenochrous	Wushe blood-spotted long-horned beetle / Cherry tree long-horned beetle	霧社血斑天牛	II
Family Carabidae		步行蟲科	
Damaster blaptoides hanae	Formosan snail-eating ground beetle	臺灣食蝸步行蟲	II
Coptolabrus nankototaijanus miwai	Formosan false snail-eating ground beetle	臺灣擬食蝸步行蟲	II
Order Orthoptera
Family Tettigoniidae		螽蟴科	
Phyllophorina kotoshoensis	Lanyu giant katydid	蘭嶼大葉螽蟴	II
Order Phasmatodea
Family Phasmatidae		竹節蟲科	
Megacrania tsudai	Tsuda's giant stick insect / Big-headed stick insect	津田氏大頭竹節蟲	II

== Plants ==
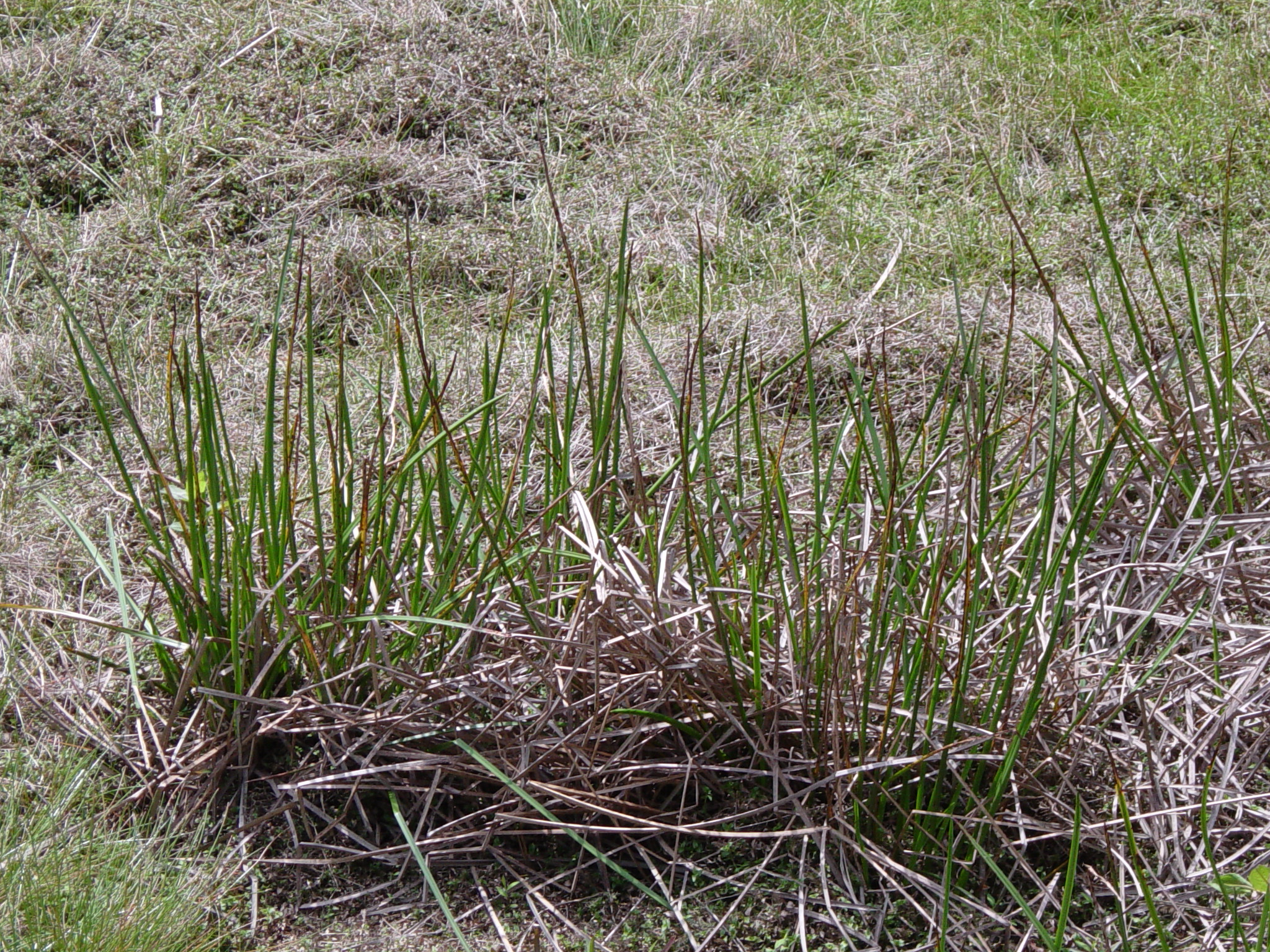
Taiwan isoetes

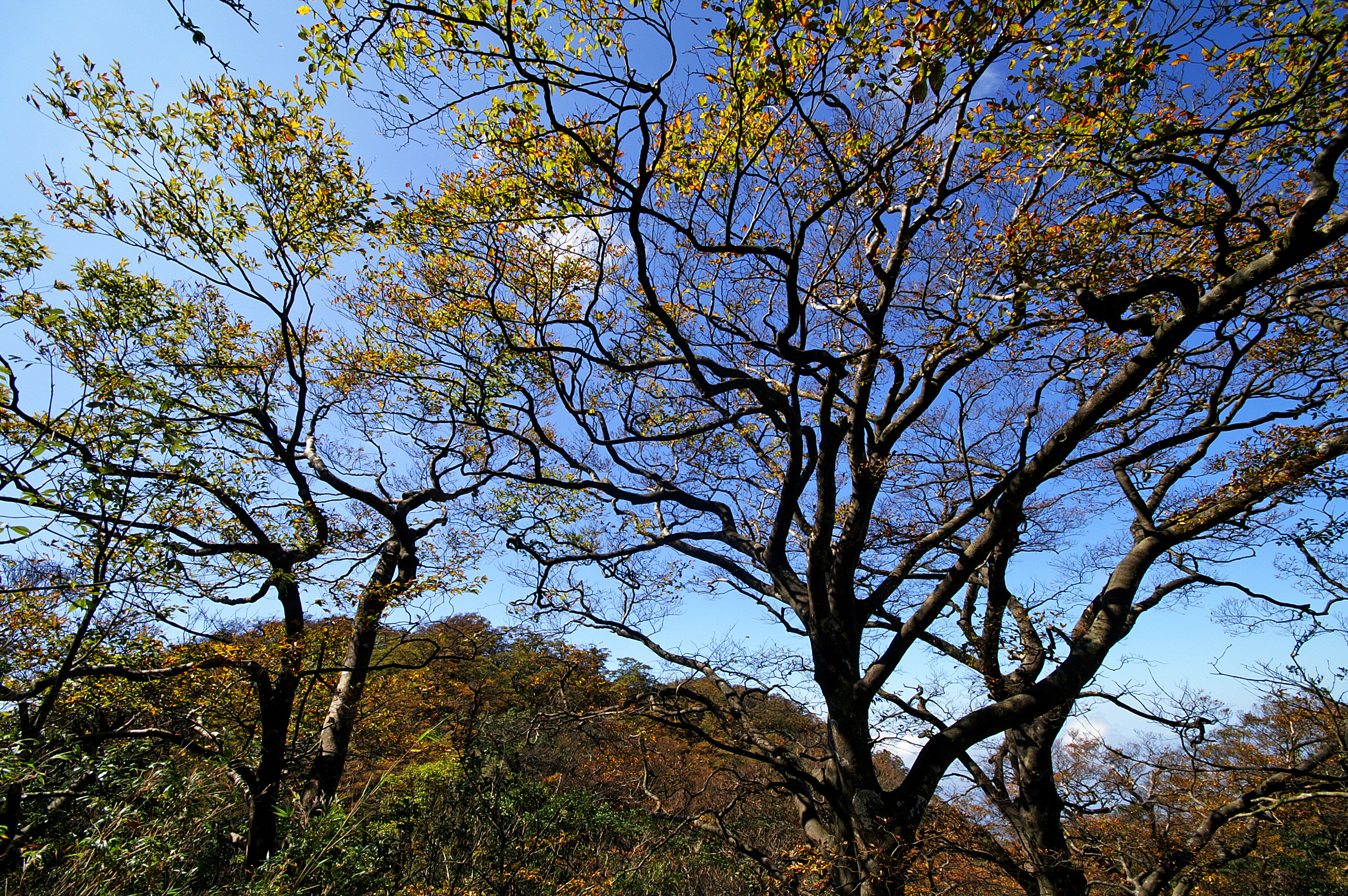
Taiwan beech

Scientific name	English common name	Chinese common name	Status
Family Isoetaceae		水韭科	
Isoetes taiwanensis	Taiwan isoetes	臺灣水韭	II
Family Taxaceae		紅豆杉科	
Amentotaxus formosana	Formosan amentotaxus	臺灣穗花杉	II
Family Pinaceae		松科	
Keteleeria davidiana var. formosana	Taiwan keteleeria	臺灣油杉	II
Family Cupressaceae		柏科	
Juniperus chinensis var. tsukusiensis	Tsukusien juniper	清水圓柏	II
Family Podocarpaceae		羅漢松科	
Podocarpus costails	Lanyu Podocarpus	蘭嶼羅漢松	II
Family Cycadaceae		蘇鐵科	
Cycas taitungensis	Taitung cycas	臺東蘇鐵	II
Family Ericaceae		杜鵑科	
Rhododendron hyperythum	Red-spotted azalea	紅星杜鵑	II
Rhododendron kanehirai	Kanehira azalea	烏來杜鵑	II
Family Onagraceae		柳葉菜科	
Epilobium nankotaizanense	Nankotaizan epilobium	南湖柳葉菜	II
Family Fagaceae		殼斗科	
Fagus hayatae	Taiwan beech	臺灣水青岡	II
Family Sapindaceae		無患子科	
Bretschneidera sinensis	Chinese bretschneidera	鐘萼木	II

== See also ==
- Endemic species of Taiwan
