= List of endemic birds of Taiwan =

Birds endemic to the island of Taiwan

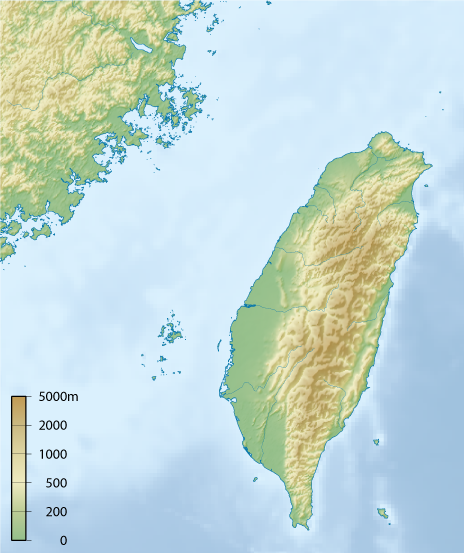
Map of Taiwan, showing the island's topography

The island of Taiwan, which is located in southeast Asia at the junction of the East China Sea and South China Seas, is home to 30 endemic bird species.

== Endemic Bird Areas ==
Birdlife International defines Endemic Bird Areas (EBAs) as places where the breeding ranges of two or more range-restricted species—those with breeding ranges of less than 50,000 km^{2} (19,000 sq mi)—overlap. In order to qualify, the whole of the breeding range of at least two range-restricted species must fall entirely within the EBA. The entire island of Taiwan has been designated as an Endemic Bird Area.

In addition, Orchid Island (Lán Yǔ), c. 75 km off the south-east coast of Taiwan has been designated as a secondary area, as two restricted-range species (Taiwan green pigeon and elegant scops owl) occur there.

== List of species ==
IUCN Red List categories
Conservation status
- EX: Extinct (1 species)
- EW: Extinct in the wild (0 species)
- CR: Critically endangered (0 species)
- EN: Endangered (0 species)
- VU: Vulnerable (1 species)
- NT: Near threatened (4 species)
- LC: Least concern (24 species)

Other categories
- DD: Data deficient (0 species)
- NE: Not evaluated (1 species)

Endemic species
Taxon. order (Note: This list uses the taxonomy proposed by the International Ornithologists' Union. Avian checklists and field guides typically list species in taxonomic order to show the evolutionary relationships between species; those which are more closely related are physically listed nearer each other.)	Common name	Picture	Scientific name	Habitat	IUCN status (Note: This column sorts by threat level, as outlined in the key above.)	Notes
1	Taiwan partridge	Photo of grey-bodied bird with brown and white striped wing and orange legs	Arborophila crudigularis		LC^{IUCN}	
2	Mikado pheasant		Syrmaticus mikado		NT^{IUCN}	
3	Swinhoe's pheasant		Lophura swinhoii		NT^{IUCN}	
4	Taiwan bamboo partridge	Photo of plump, orange-bellied grey bird walking on gravel	Bambusicola sonorivox		LC^{IUCN}	
5	Taiwan barbet		Psilopogon nuchalis		LC^{IUCN}	
6	Taiwan blue magpie		Urocissa caerulea		LC^{IUCN}	
7	Chestnut-bellied tit		Sittiparus castaneoventris		LC^{IUCN}	
8	Yellow tit		Machlolophus holsti		NT^{IUCN}	
9	Styan's bulbul		Pycnonotus taivanus		VU^{IUCN}	
10	Taiwan cupwing		Pnoepyga formosana		LC^{IUCN}	
11	Taiwan bush warbler		Locustella alishanensis		LC^{IUCN}	Also known as Taiwan grasshopper-warbler
12	Taiwan fulvetta		Fulvetta formosana		LC^{IUCN}	
13	Taiwan yuhina		Yuhina brunneiceps		LC^{IUCN}	
14	Taiwan scimitar babbler		Pomatorhinus musicus		LC^{IUCN}	
15	Black-necklaced scimitar babbler		Erythrogenys erythrocnemis		LC^{IUCN}	
16	White-whiskered laughingthrush		Trochalopteron morrisonianum		LC^{IUCN}	
17	White-eared sibia		Heterophasia auricularis		LC^{IUCN}	
18	Taiwan barwing		Actinodura morrisoniana		LC^{IUCN}	
19	Steere's liocichla		Liocichla steerii		LC^{IUCN}	Also known as Taiwan liocichla
20	Taiwan hwamei		Garrulax taewanus		NT^{IUCN}	
21	Rufous-crowned laughingthrush		Pterorhinus ruficeps		LC^{IUCN}	
22	Rusty laughingthrush		Pterorhinus poecilorhynchus		LC^{IUCN}	
23	Flamecrest		Regulus goodfellowi		LC^{IUCN}	
24	Taiwan thrush		Turdus niveiceps		LC^{IUCN}	
25	Taiwan vivid niltava		Niltava vivida		LC^{IUCN}	Also known as small niltava
26	Taiwan shortwing		Brachypteryx goodfellowi		LC^{IUCN}	
27	Collared bush robin		Tarsiger johnstoniae		LC^{IUCN}	
28	Taiwan whistling thrush		Myophonus insularis		LC^{IUCN}	
29	Taiwan bullfinch		Pyrrhula owstoni		Not recognised by the IUCN	Sometimes considered a subspecies of the grey-headed bullfinch
30	Taiwan rosefinch		Carpodacus formosanus		LC^{IUCN}	

=== Fossil species ===
Endemic species
Taxon order	Common name	Picture	Scientific name	Habitat	Status	Notes
N/A	Extinct peafowl		†Pavo miejue		EX	The only extinct endemic bird species of Taiwan at the time of its description in 2026

== Citations ==
=== References ===
- BirdLife International (2004). "Most Endemic Bird Areas are in the tropics and important for other biodiversity too". birdlife.org.
- BirdLife International (2022a). "Data Zone: Taiwan".
- BirdLife International (2022b). "Data Zone: Taiwan Grasshopper-Warbler".
- BirdLife International (2022c). "Data Zone: Taiwan Liocichla".
- BirdLife International (2022d). "Data Zone: Small Niltava".
- BirdLife International (2022e). "Data Zone: Grey-headed Bullfinch".
- Cornell Lab of Ornithology (16 November 2015). "What is taxonomic order and why is it used for the sequence of birds in my field guide?". All About Birds.
- Gill, Frank; Donsker, David & Rasmussen, Pamela, eds. (2022). "IOC World Bird List". IOC.
- Lan, Yong-Jie; Mayr, Gerald; Tsai, Cheng-Hsiu (2026-05-20). "A new Pleistocene peafowl from Taiwan reveals the extinction of a large galliform bird in East Asia". Royal Society Open Science. 13 (5) 260347. doi:10.1098/rsos.260347. ISSN 2054-5703.
