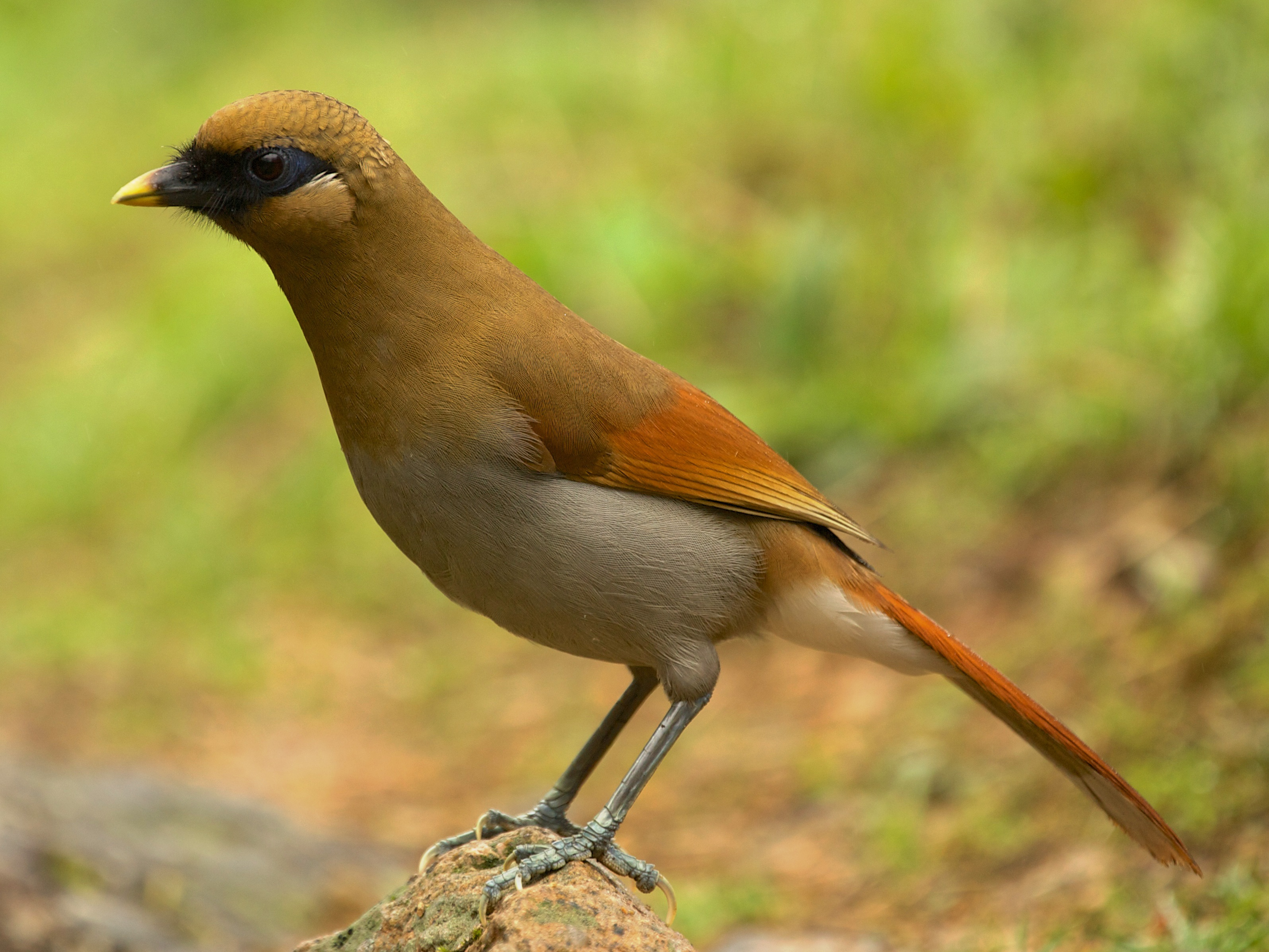
- in Huangshan

Conservation status
- Least Concern (IUCN 3.1)

Scientific classification
- Kingdom: Animalia
- Phylum: Chordata
- Class: Aves
- Order: Passeriformes
- Family: Leiothrichidae
- Genus: Pterorhinus
- Species: P. berthemyi

Binomial name
- Pterorhinus berthemyi (Oustalet, 1876)

Synonyms
- Garrulax poecilorhynchus berthemyi Ianthocincla berthemyi Garrulax berthemyi

= Buffy laughingthrush =

Bird in the family Leiothrichidae from China

The buffy laughingthrush (Pterorhinus berthemyi), also known as the chestnut-winged laughingthrush, is a species of bird in the family Leiothrichidae. It was formerly considered a subspecies of the rusty laughingthrush, P. poecilorhynchus; a species restricted to Taiwan following the split. Compared to the rusty laughingthrush, the buffy laughingthrush has paler grey underparts, more contrasting rufous wings, broader white tips to the tail, and distinct black lores.

This species was formerly placed in the genus Garrulax but following the publication of a comprehensive molecular phylogenetic study in 2018, it was moved to the resurrected genus Pterorhinus.
