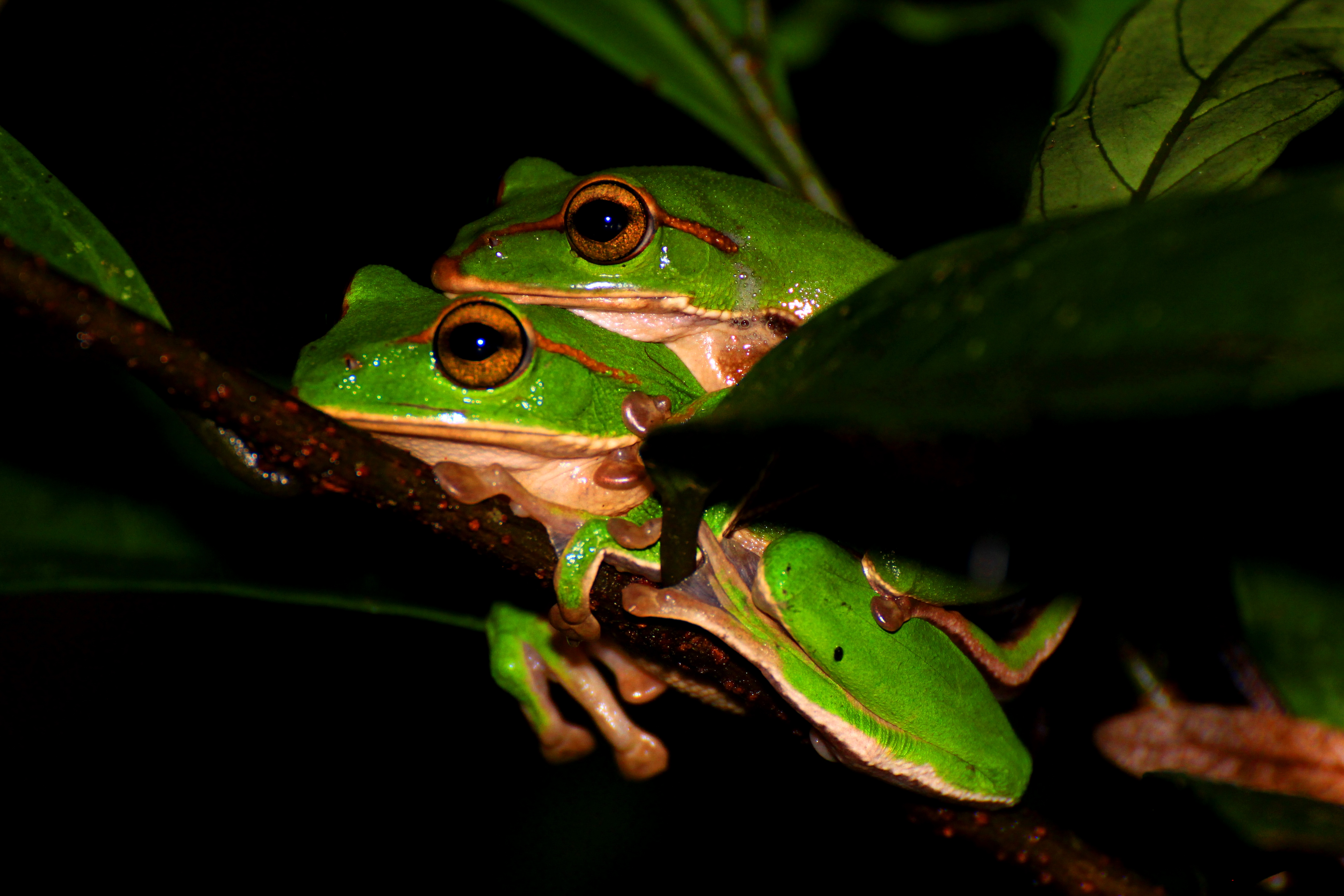

Conservation status
- Near Threatened (IUCN 3.1)

Scientific classification
- Kingdom: Animalia
- Phylum: Chordata
- Class: Amphibia
- Order: Anura
- Family: Rhacophoridae
- Genus: Zhangixalus
- Species: Z. prasinatus

Binomial name
- Zhangixalus prasinatus (Mou, Risch & Lue, 1983)

Synonyms
- Rhacophorus prasinatus Mou, Risch, and Lue, 1983; Rhacophorus smaragdinus Lue & Mou, 1984

= Zhangixalus prasinatus =

Species of amphibian

Zhangixalus prasinatus (common names: tributary flying frog, green treefrog, emerald green treefrog) is a species of frog in the family Rhacophoridae endemic to northern Taiwan. It has been observed between 400 and 600 meters above sea level.

== Appearance ==
Z. prasinatus is the largest tree frog in Taiwan; the adult female frog can be 65 mm (2.6 in) to 77 mm (3.0 in) in snout-vent length. The adult male frog is about 48 mm (1.9 in) to 63 mm (2.5 in) mm long. This frog is green in color with a yellow stripe on each side and a white belly. All toes have climbing disks and all four feet are webbed. Some individuals have spots.

== Habitat and threats ==
It is known from Taiwan, where it has been observed between 400 and 600 meters above sea level. Its habitats are orchards, tea plantations, bamboo forests, shrublands, and forests in hilly areas. Its range includes at least one protected park: Hapen Nature Reserve. Breeding takes place in tree holes, but also in cisterns, buckets, or water tanks. It is threatened by habitat loss and degradation, specifically agriculture, grazing, urbanization, and changes in agriculture that involve increased use of pesticides. This species is known to live in several protected areas. Scientists believe it may be somewhat tolerant to alterations to its habitat.

== Etymology ==
The name of the genus honors Zhang Ya-Ping from the Chinese Academy of Sciences, in recognition to his contributions to biodiversity and evolution research in China, in combination with ixalus, a common generic root for treefrogs . The specific name refers to the frog's green coloration.

== See also ==
- List of protected species in Taiwan
- List of endemic species of Taiwan
