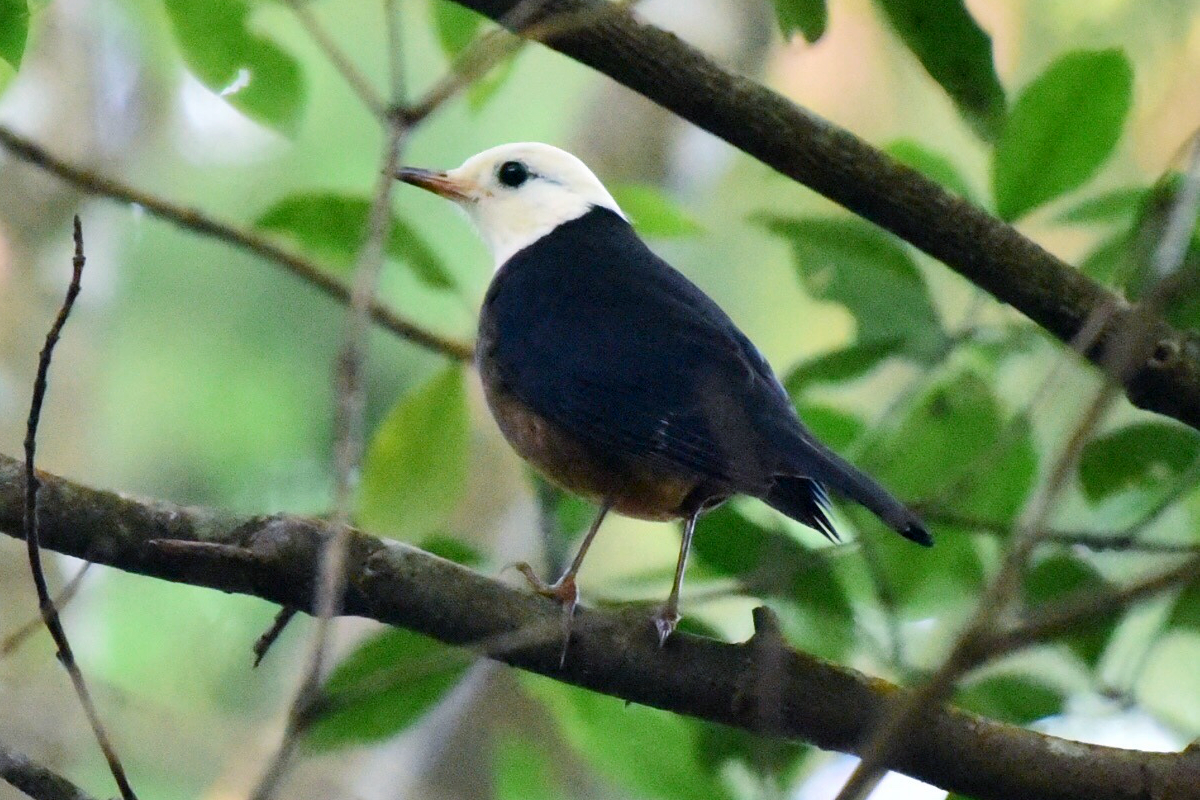
- Male
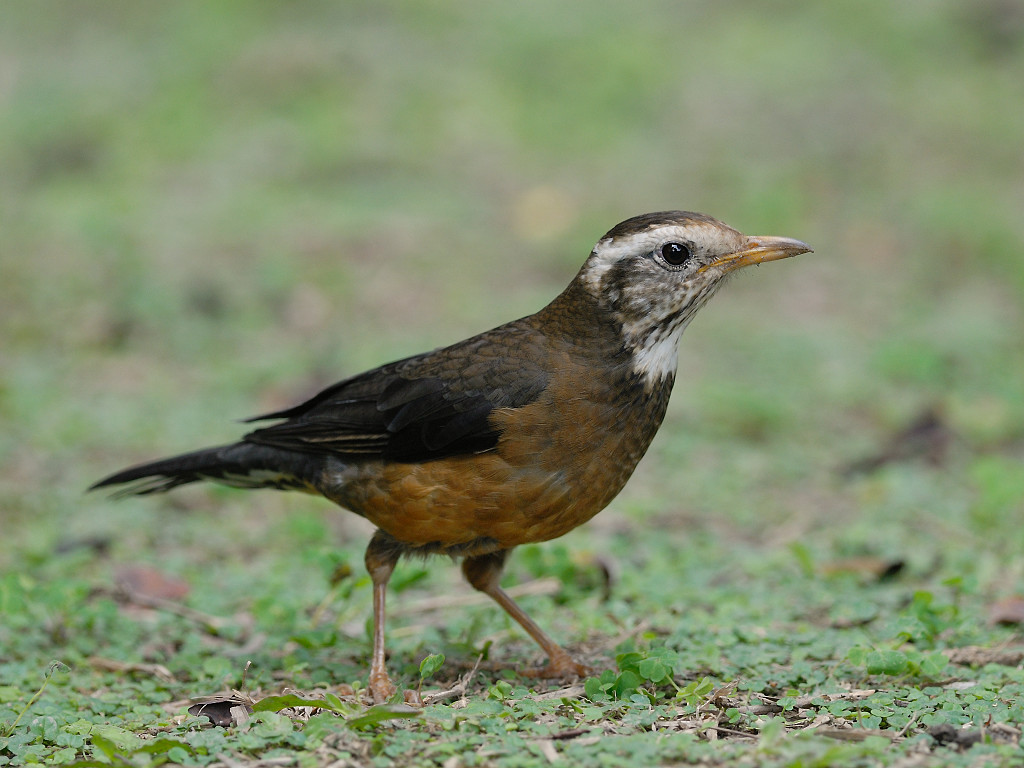
- Female

Conservation status
- Least Concern (IUCN 3.1)

Scientific classification
- Kingdom: Animalia
- Phylum: Chordata
- Class: Aves
- Order: Passeriformes
- Family: Turdidae
- Genus: Turdus
- Species: T. niveiceps

Binomial name
- Turdus niveiceps (Hellmayr, 1919)

= Taiwan thrush =

Species of bird

The Taiwan thrush (Turdus niveiceps) is a bird in the thrush family, in the genus Turdus. It is endemic to Taiwan.

== Taxonomy ==
It was formerly considered a subspecies of the island thrush (T. poliocephalus) complex, but genetic studies indicate that it is not closely related, and it displays some characteristics such as distinct sexual dimorphism not known from any of the other island thrush subspecies. It was reclassified as a distinct species by the IOC in 2021.

== Description ==
The male Taiwan thrush has black upperparts except for a white head and throat. The underparts are mainly dark orange with a blackish upper breast. The female has similar patterning but is duller, with a brown back, the head patterned brown and white and with a white supercilium, a buff throat, the upper breast streaked brown, and with duller orange underparts. Its bill, legs and feet are yellow. Males and females are similar in size, about 22 cm in length.

== Distribution and habitat ==
The species is a rare resident of central Taiwan's mountain forests at altitudes of 1800–2500 m.

== Behaviour ==
=== Feeding ===
The Taiwan thrush forages through trees, low vegetation, and on the ground in leaf litter. Its diet includes a variety of invertebrates as well as seeds, berries and fruit.

== See also ==
- List of protected species in Taiwan
- List of endemic species of Taiwan
- List of endemic birds of Taiwan
