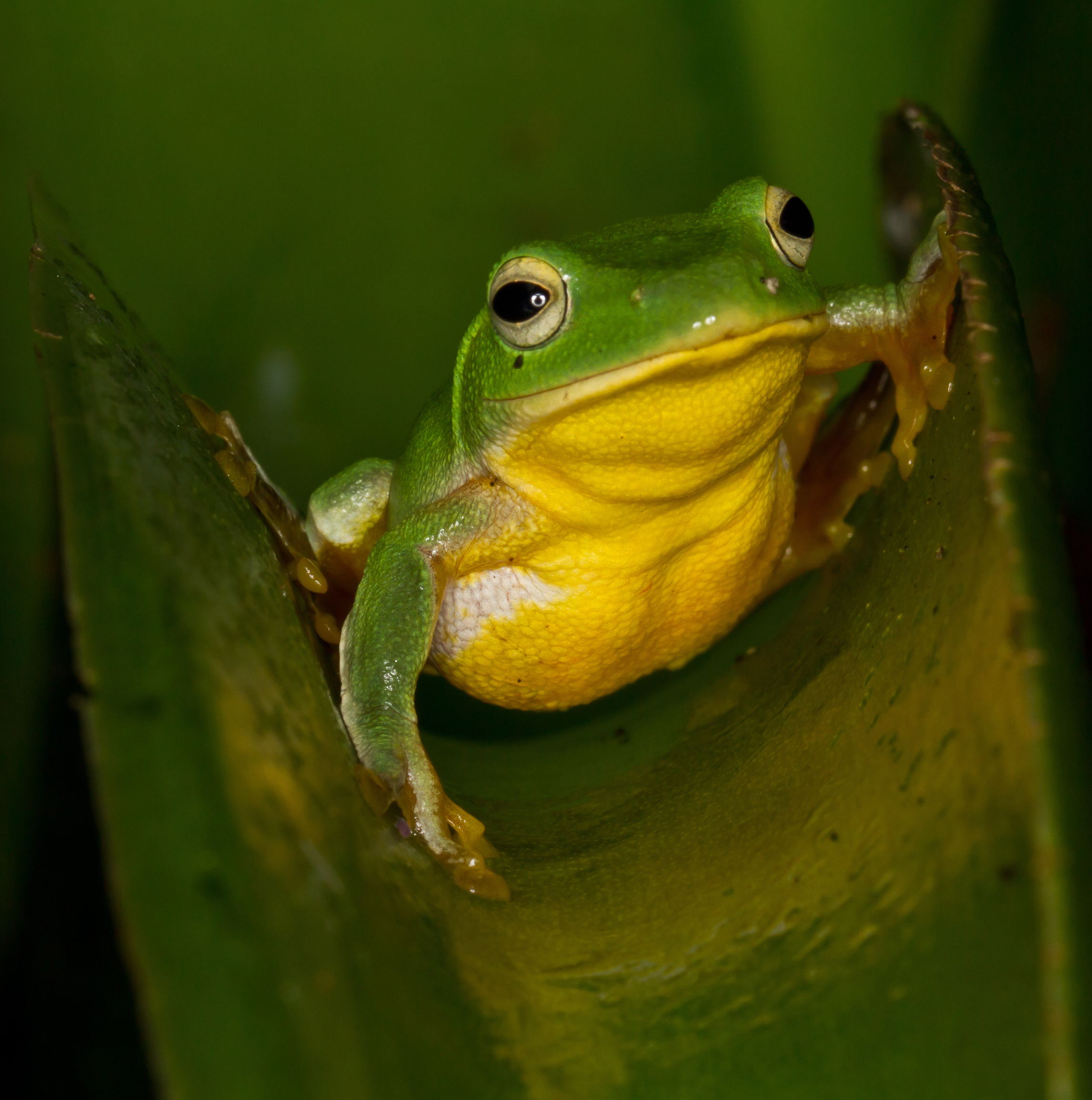

Conservation status
- Vulnerable (IUCN 3.1)

Scientific classification
- Kingdom: Animalia
- Phylum: Chordata
- Class: Amphibia
- Order: Anura
- Family: Rhacophoridae
- Genus: Zhangixalus
- Species: Z. taipeianus

Binomial name
- Zhangixalus taipeianus (Liang and Wang, 1978)

Synonyms
- Rhacophorus taipeianus Liang and Wang, 1978

= Taipei tree frog =

Species of amphibian

The Taipei tree frog (Zhangixalus taipeianus) is a species of frog in the family Rhacophoridae. It is endemic to central and northern Taiwan. It is a medium-sized tree frog; females are 4.5–5.5 cm (1.8–2.2 in) in snout-vent length, and males are slightly smaller 3.5–4.5 cm (1.4–1.8 in).

Its natural habitats are subtropical or tropical moist lowland forest, subtropical or tropical moist montane forest, swamps, intermittent freshwater marshes, arable land, plantations, ponds, and irrigated land. It has been observed no higher than 1500 meters above sea level.

The adult male frog measures about 35–45 mm in snout-vent length and the adult female frog 45–55 mm. They skin of the dorsum is green in color. There is webbed skin on all four feet and large climbing disks on all toes. This frog can change color from dark brown to light green. Individual frogs may have yellow, blue, or white spots or other marks. There is yellow color on the belly and legs. The iris of the eye is yellow in color.

Adult frogs are arboreal. They climb down from the trees to lay eggs. The male frog digs a hole in the mud near a rice paddy or pond, sometimes beneath straw or leaves. The male frog sits in the hole and sings for the females. Male frogs can be territorial and may fight over good nesting sites. The female frog then lays her eggs in the hole and covers them in foam. She lays 300–400 eggs per clutch. The tadpoles are gray-white in color with spots. The tadpoles swim in the water at the bottom of the hole for about 40 days. Sufficient rainfall allows the tadpoles to escape into the rice paddy or pond.

This frog is classified as vulnerable by the IUCN. Farmers in Taiwan have shifted away from rice cultivation and modified the paddies, leaving fewer places for the tadpoles to grow.

== Cultural Influence ==
Taipei Tree Frog was the official mascot of the 2009 Summer Deaflympics held in Taipei, Taiwan

== Etymology ==
The name of the genus honors Zhang Ya-Ping from the Chinese Academy of Sciences, in recognition to his contributions to biodiversity and evolution research in China, in combination with ixalus, a common generic root for treefrogs. The specific name is in reference to Taipei.

== See also ==
- List of protected species in Taiwan
- List of endemic species of Taiwan
