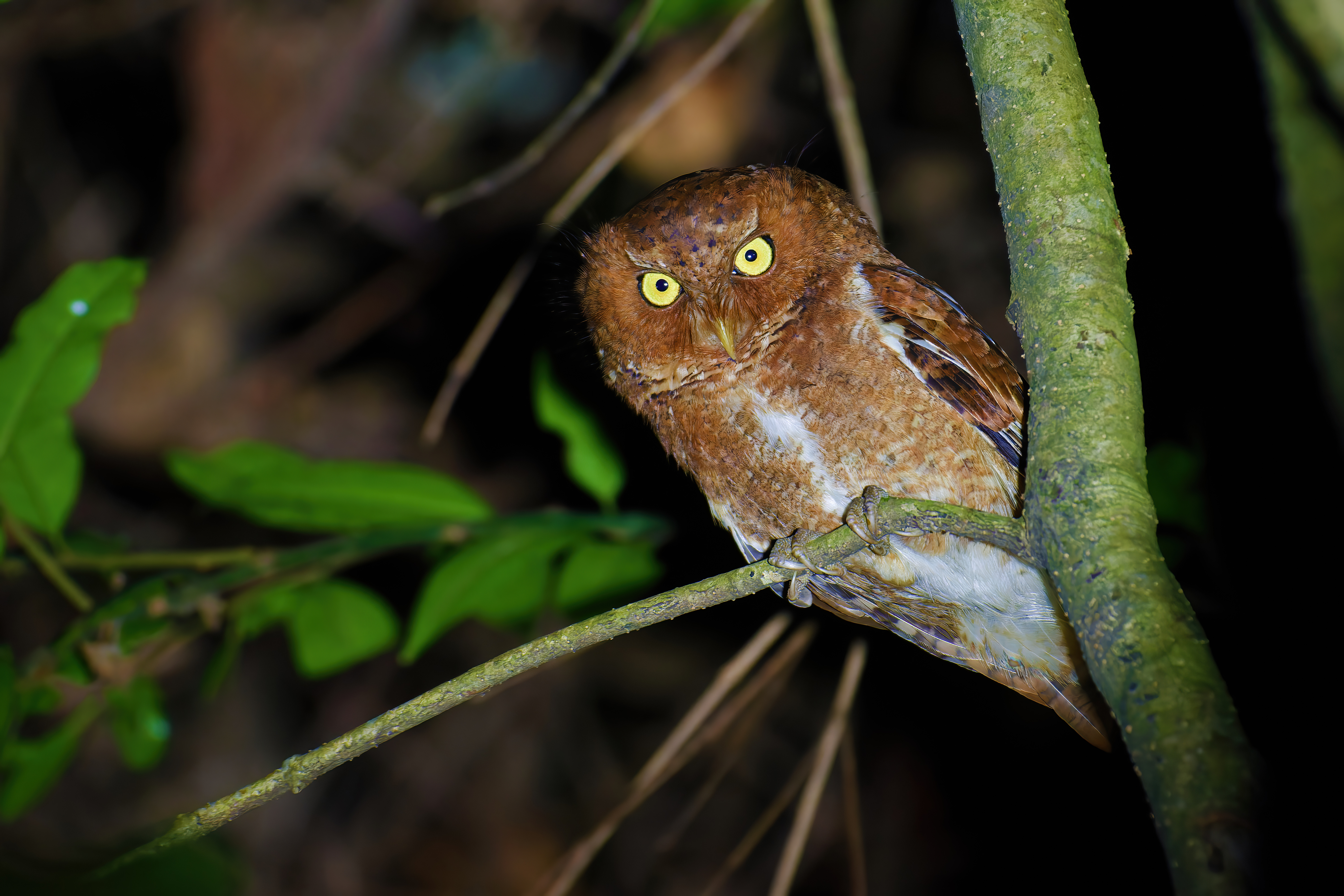
- The nominate subspecies O. s. spilocephalus

Conservation status
- Least Concern (IUCN 3.1)
- CITES Appendix II

Scientific classification
- Kingdom: Animalia
- Phylum: Chordata
- Class: Aves
- Order: Strigiformes
- Family: Strigidae
- Genus: Otus
- Species: O. spilocephalus

Binomial name
- Otus spilocephalus (Blyth, 1846)

Synonyms
- Otus stresemanni

= Mountain scops owl =

Species of owl

The mountain scops owl (Otus spilocephalus), sometimes referred to as the spotted scops owl, is a species of owl in the family Strigidae. Its range extends across much of south and southeast Asia, from Pakistan and the Himalayas in the northwest, through Taiwan, Thailand and Malaysia in the east and south.

The nominate subspecies of the eastern Himalayas has a distinct more russet plumage.

It is an altitudinal migrant.

The owls have a short high-pitched call like a two-note whistle, "plew-plew" or "he-he", although the female's songs are rarely heard. Their calls also differ between geographic population.

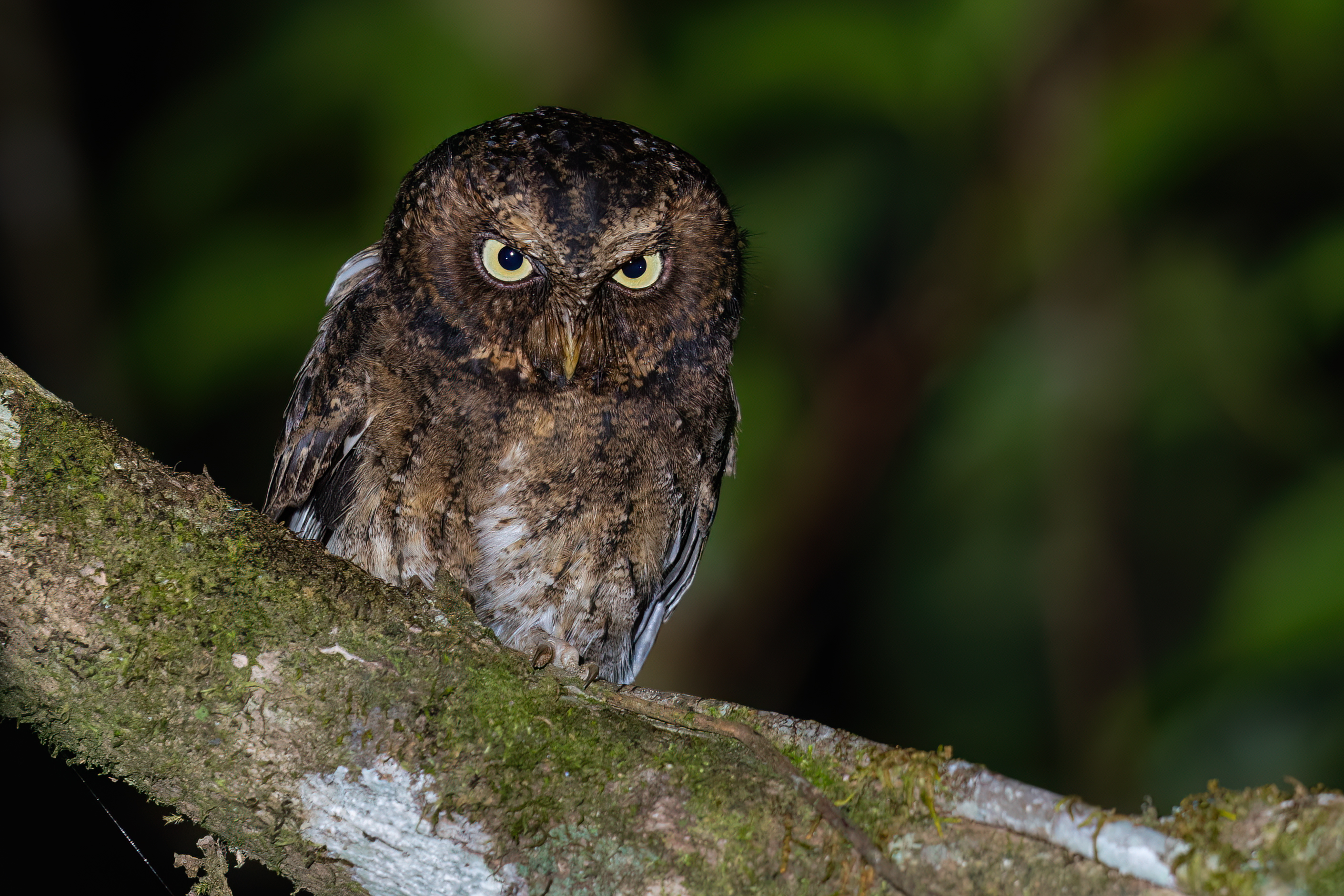

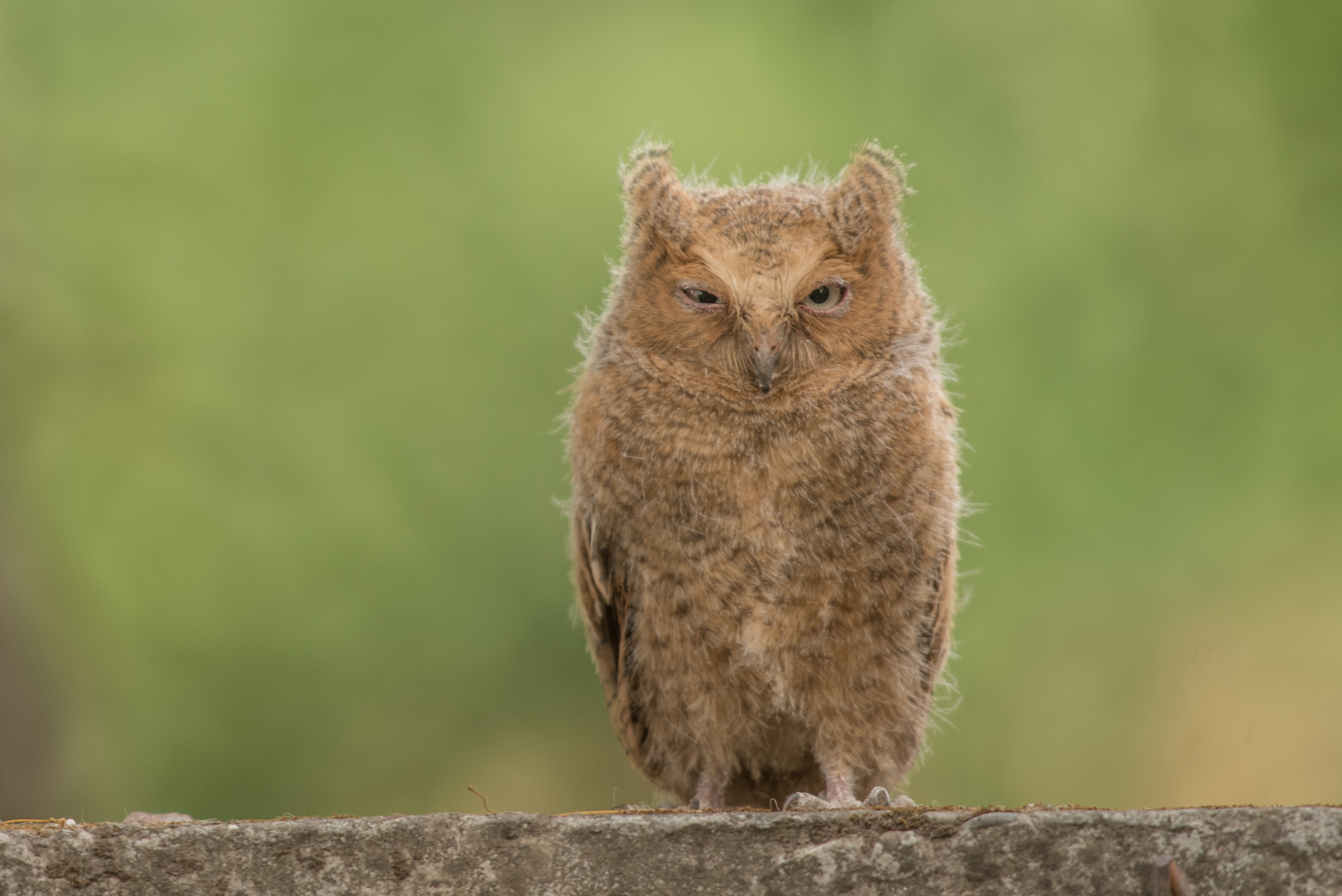
A juvenile mountain scops owl photographed at Sattal, India
