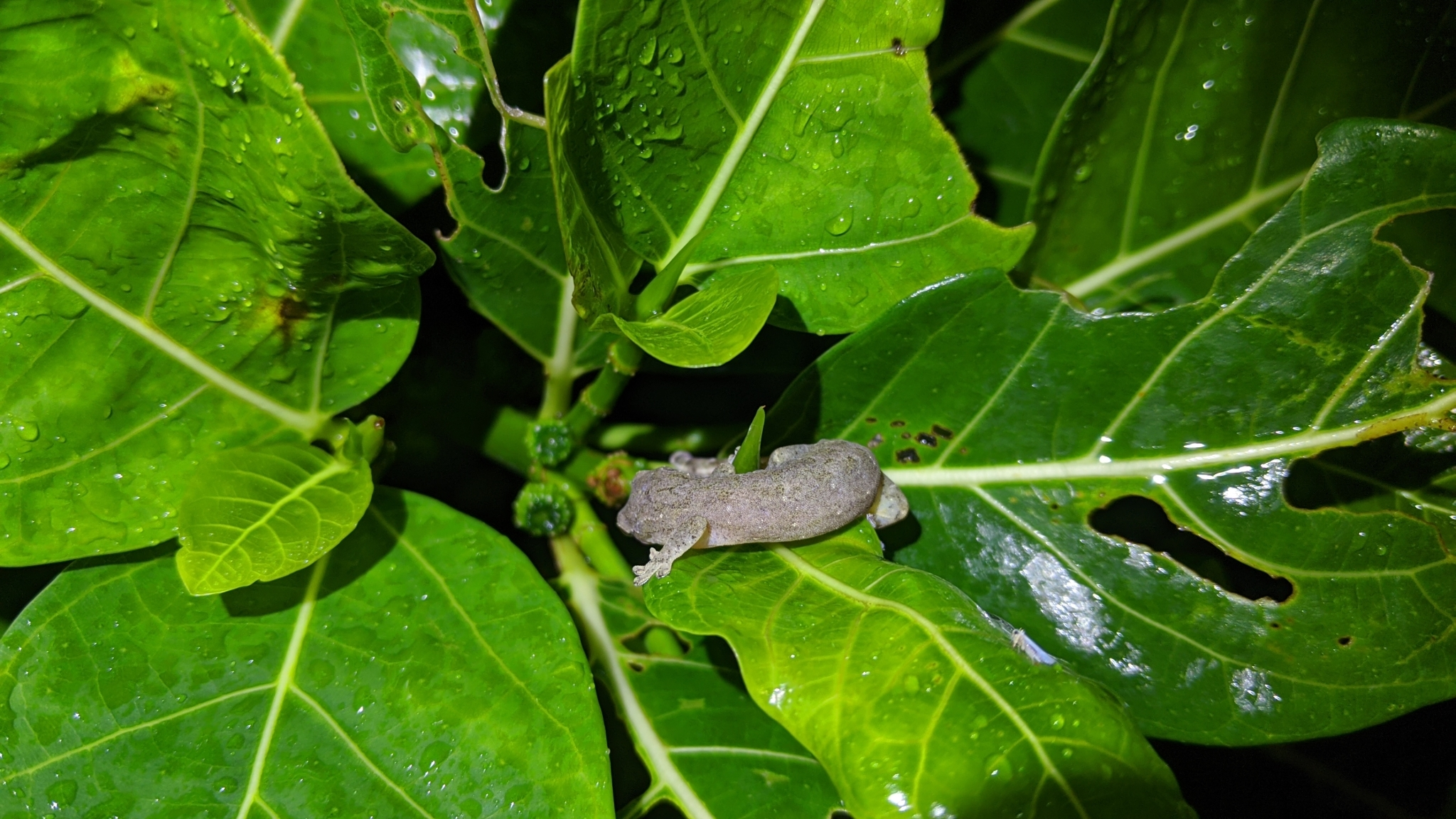

Conservation status
- Near Threatened (IUCN 3.1)

Scientific classification
- Kingdom: Animalia
- Phylum: Chordata
- Class: Reptilia
- Order: Squamata
- Suborder: Gekkota
- Family: Gekkonidae
- Genus: Lepidodactylus
- Species: L. yami

Binomial name
- Lepidodactylus yami Ota, 1987

= Lanyu scaly-toed gecko =

Species of lizard

The Lanyu scaly-toed gecko (Lepidodactylus yami) is a species of lizard in the family Gekkonidae. The species is endemic to Orchid Island (Chinese: 蘭嶼; pinyin: Lán Yǔ), Taiwan.

== Etymology ==
The specific name, yami, is in honor of the Yami people, who is the indigenous group to Orchid Island.

== Reproduction ==
L. yami is oviparous. It gives birth to a specific number of two attached eggs each time during reproduction.
