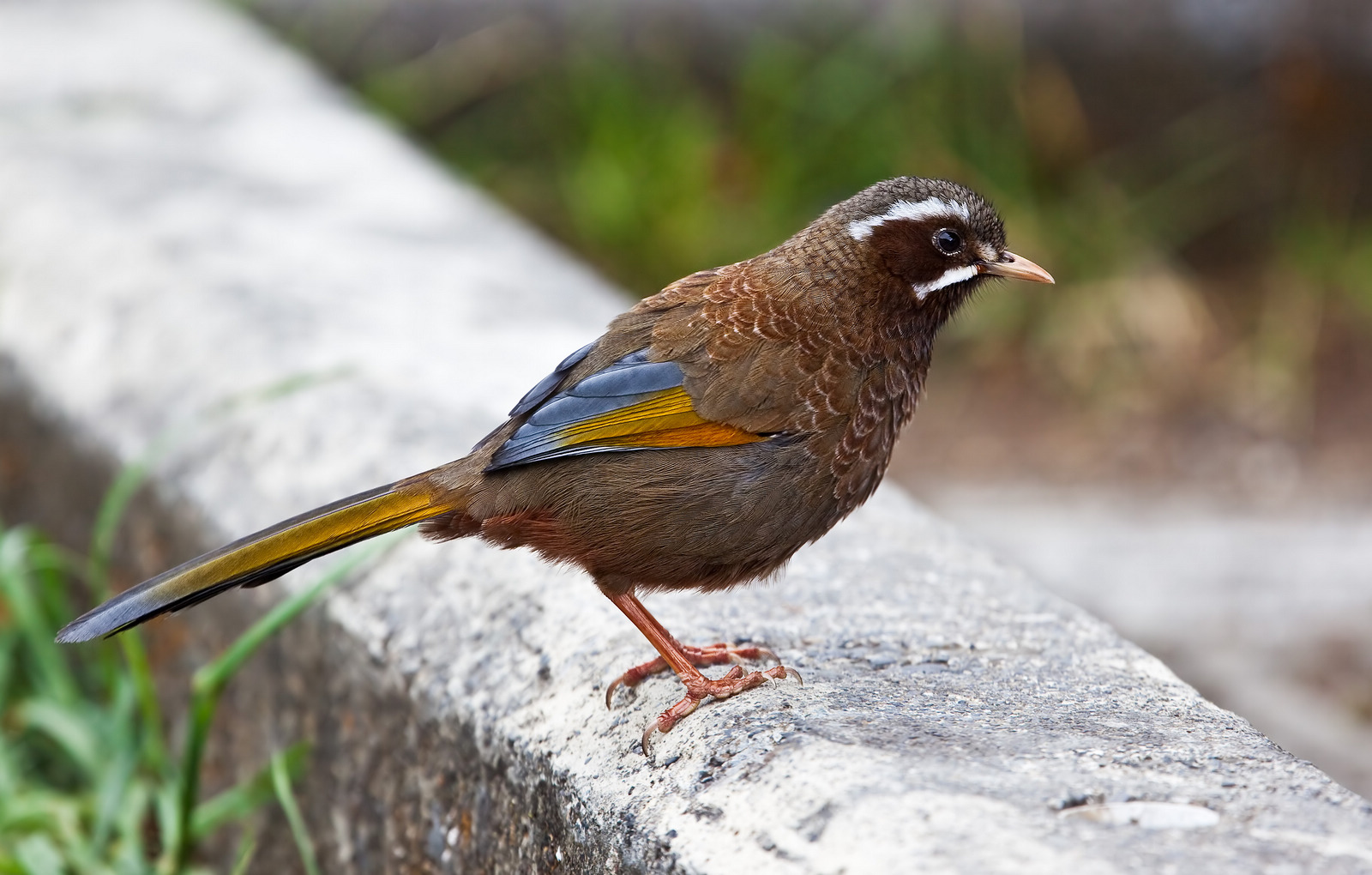

Conservation status
- Least Concern (IUCN 3.1)

Scientific classification
- Kingdom: Animalia
- Phylum: Chordata
- Class: Aves
- Order: Passeriformes
- Family: Leiothrichidae
- Genus: Trochalopteron
- Species: T. morrisonianum

Binomial name
- Trochalopteron morrisonianum Ogilvie-Grant, 1906

= White-whiskered laughingthrush =

Species of bird

The white-whiskered laughingthrush or Formosan laughing thrush (Trochalopteron morrisonianum) is a species of bird in the family Leiothrichidae. It is endemic to montane forests of the island of Taiwan.

== Description ==
White-whiskered laughingthrush is a large, 26 to 28 cm (10 to 11 in) long, laughingthrush with a distinctive face pattern. The bill is thrush-like and yellowish to horn-colored. The eyes are black. The legs are strong and brownish pink. The mean body weight is about 77 grams (2.7 oz).

It is a sociable species that often occurs in large groups. It is not necessarily afraid of humans.

== Habitat and ecology ==
The species occurs at elevations between 1,475 and 3,300 m (4,839 and 10,827 ft) above sea level, but typically above 2000 m, in tall grass, forest undergrowth, thickets, and forest edge scrub. It can enter open areas by roadsides and in forest clearings. In the Yushan National Park, it was more abundant in mixed coniferous forest than in grassland, pine woodland, or spruce forest; along with Taiwan fulvetta (Fulvetta formosana) and Taiwan yuhina (Yuhina brunneiceps), it was a dominant species in that habitat. It is a ground omnivore.

== Conservation ==
White-whiskered laughingthrush is a somewhat common species in Taiwan, with an estimated population size between 10,000 and 100,000 breeding pairs. Although its population is believed to be decreasing because of habitat destruction and fragmentation, it is not considered a vulnerable species.
