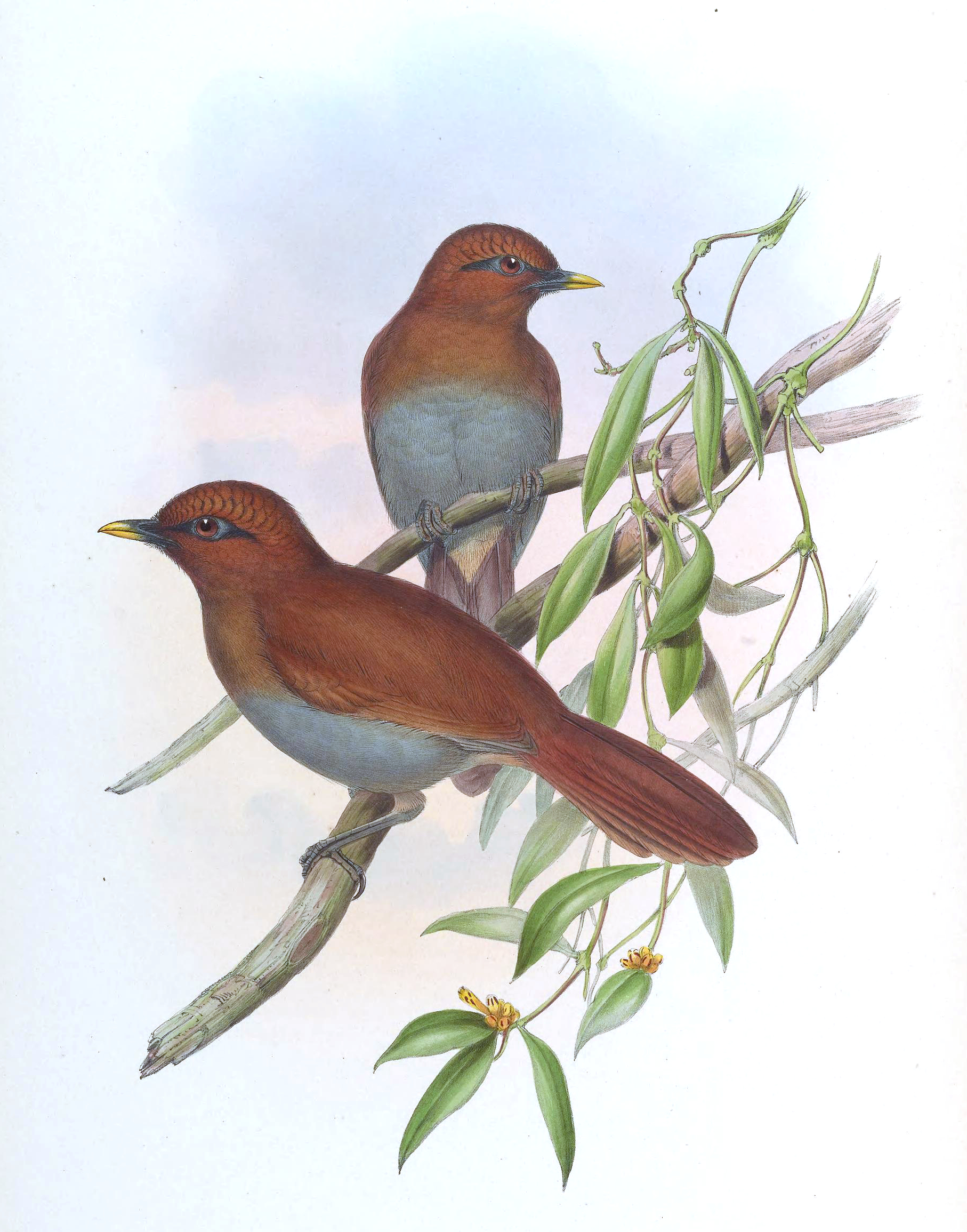
- Illustration by John Gould

Conservation status
- Least Concern (IUCN 3.1)

Scientific classification
- Kingdom: Animalia
- Phylum: Chordata
- Class: Aves
- Order: Passeriformes
- Family: Leiothrichidae
- Genus: Pterorhinus
- Species: P. poecilorhynchus

Binomial name
- Pterorhinus poecilorhynchus (Gould, 1863)

Synonyms
- Ianthocincla poecilorhyncha Garrulax poecilorhynchus

= Rusty laughingthrush =

Species of bird

The rusty laughingthrush (Pterorhinus poecilorhynchus) is a species of bird in the family Leiothrichidae. It is endemic to Taiwan. It formerly included the buffy laughingthrush of mainland China as a subspecies. Compared to the rusty laughingthrush, the buffy laughingthrush has paler grey underparts, more contrasting rufous wings, broader white tips to the tail, and distinct black lores.

This species was formerly placed in the genus Garrulax but following the publication of a comprehensive molecular phylogenetic study in 2018, it was moved to the resurrected genus Pterorhinus.
