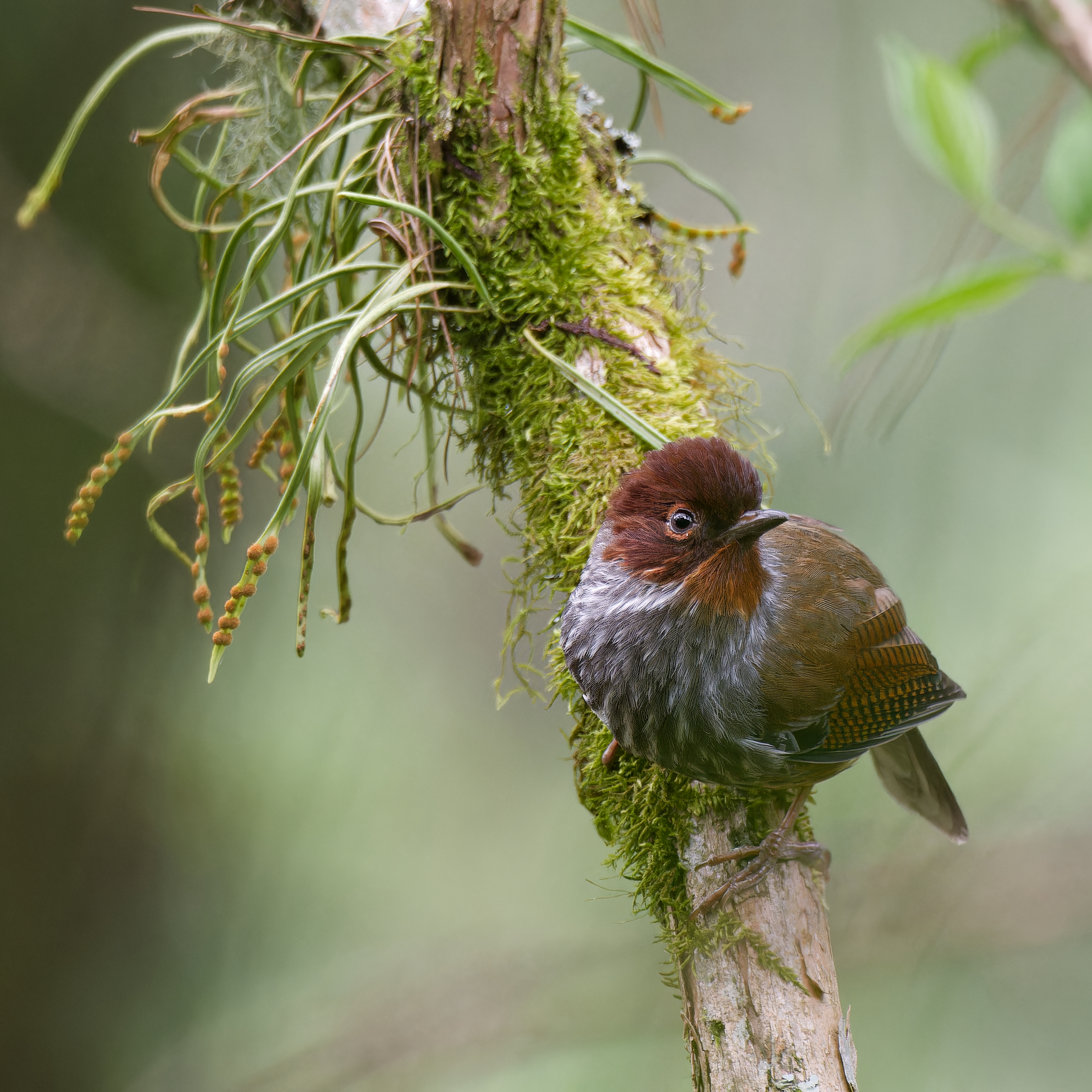

Conservation status
- Least Concern (IUCN 3.1)

Scientific classification
- Kingdom: Animalia
- Phylum: Chordata
- Class: Aves
- Order: Passeriformes
- Family: Leiothrichidae
- Genus: Actinodura
- Species: A. morrisoniana

Binomial name
- Actinodura morrisoniana Ogilvie-Grant, 1906

Synonyms
- Sibia morrisoniana (Ogilvie-Grant, 1906)

= Taiwan barwing =

Species of bird

The Taiwan barwing or Formosan barwing (Actinodura morrisoniana) is a species of bird in the family Leiothrichidae. It is found in Taiwan. Its natural habitats are temperate forests and subtropical or tropical moist lowland forests.
