= List of endemic species of Taiwan =

The endemic species of Taiwan are organisms that are endemic to the island of Taiwan – that is, they naturally occur nowhere else on Earth.

Percentages of endemic species and subspecies in selected animal groups in Taiwan:

Category	Total species	Endemic species (& ssp.)	Percentages
Mammals	70	45	64%
Birds	450	84	19%
Reptiles	85	27	32%
Amphibians	37	17	46%
Freshwater fish	220	36	16%
Butterflies	400	50	13%
Total	1,257	252	20%

Percentages of endemic plants of all living species in Taiwan.

Category	Total (native) species	Endemic species (& ssp.)	Percentages
Pteridophytes	629	72	11%
Gymnosperms	28	18	64%
Dicotyledons	2,410	750	31%
Monocotyledons	1,010	227	23%
Total	4,077	1,067	26%

== Endemic fauna ==
=== Endemic mammals ===
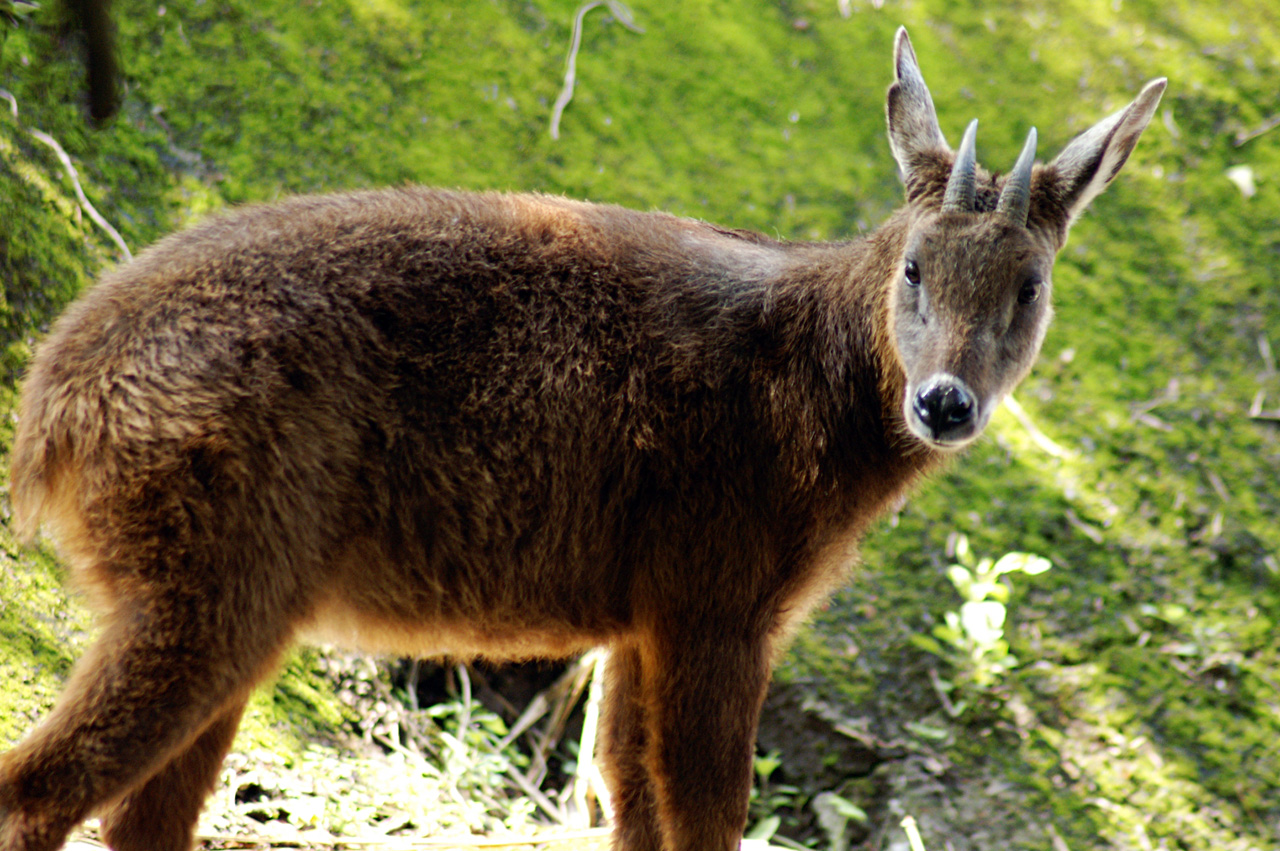
Formosan serow

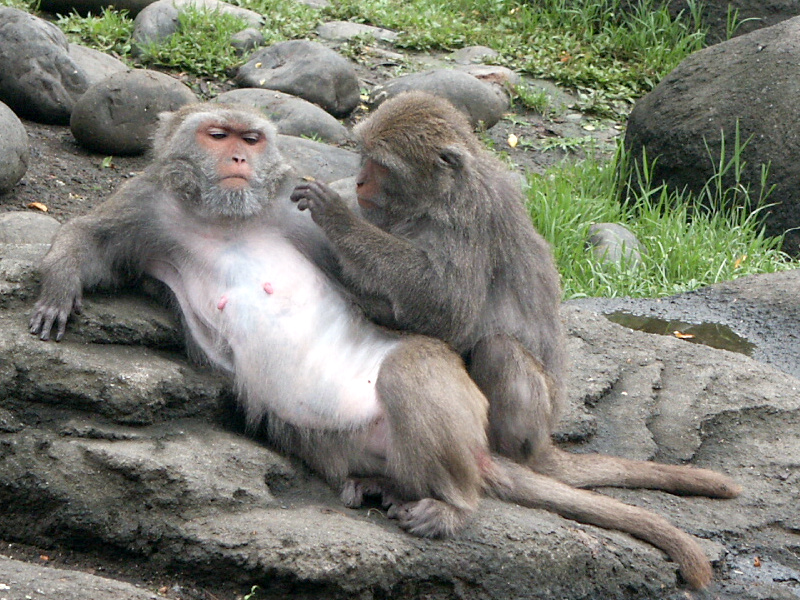
Formosan macaque

- Order: Carnivora (carnivorans)
  - Formosan black bear – Ursus thibetanus formosanus
  - Formosan ferret-badger – Melogale subaurantiaca (Swinhoe)
- Order Artiodactyla (even-toed ungulates)
  - Formosan boar – Sus scrofa taivanus
  - Formosan sika deer – Cervus nippon taiouanus
  - Taiwan serow – Naemorhedus swinhoei (Gray)
- Order Eulipotyphla (shrews and kin)
  - Taiwanese mole shrew – Anourosorex yamashinai Kuroda
  - Tada's shrew – Crocidura tadae Tokuda & Kano
  - Formosan shrew – Episoriculus fumidus Thomas
  - Koshun shrew – Chodsigoa sodalis Thomas
  - Kano's mole – Mogera kanoana Kawada et al.
- Order Rodentia (rodents)
  - Formosan field vole – Apodemus semotus Thomas
  - Spinous country-rat – Niviventer coxingi (Swinhoe)
  - Formosan white-bellied rat – Niviventer culturatus (Thomas)
  - Kikuchi's field vole – Microtus kikuchii (Kuroda)
  - Formosan giant flying squirrel – Petaurista grandis (Swinhoe)
  - Taiwan red-and-white giant flying squirrel – Petaurista lena Thomas
- Order Primate (primates)
  - Formosan macaque – Macaca cyclopis (Swinhoe)
- Order Chiroptera (bats)
  - Formosan long-eared bat – Plecotus taivanus Yoshiyuki
  - Long-toed myotis – Myotis secundus Ruedi, Csorba, Lin & Chou
  - Reddish myotis – Myotis soror Ruedi, Csorba, Lin & Chou
  - Formosan mouse-eared bat – Myotis taiwanensis Linde
  - Formosan broad-muzzled bat – Submyotodon latirostris Kishida
  - Bicolored tube-nosed bat – Murina bicolor Kuo, Fang, Csorba & Lee
  - Slender tube-nosed bat – Murina gracilis Kuo et al.
  - Formosan tube-nosed bat – Murina puta Kishida
  - Murina recondita Kuo, Fang, Csorba & Lee, 2009
  - Yellow-necked bat – Thainycteris torquatus Gabor & Lee
  - Formosan leaf-nosed bat – Hipposideros terasensis Kisida
  - Formosan greater horseshoe bat – Rhinolophus formosae Sanborn
  - Formosan lesser horseshoe bat – Rhinolophus monoceros Andersen

=== Endemic birds ===
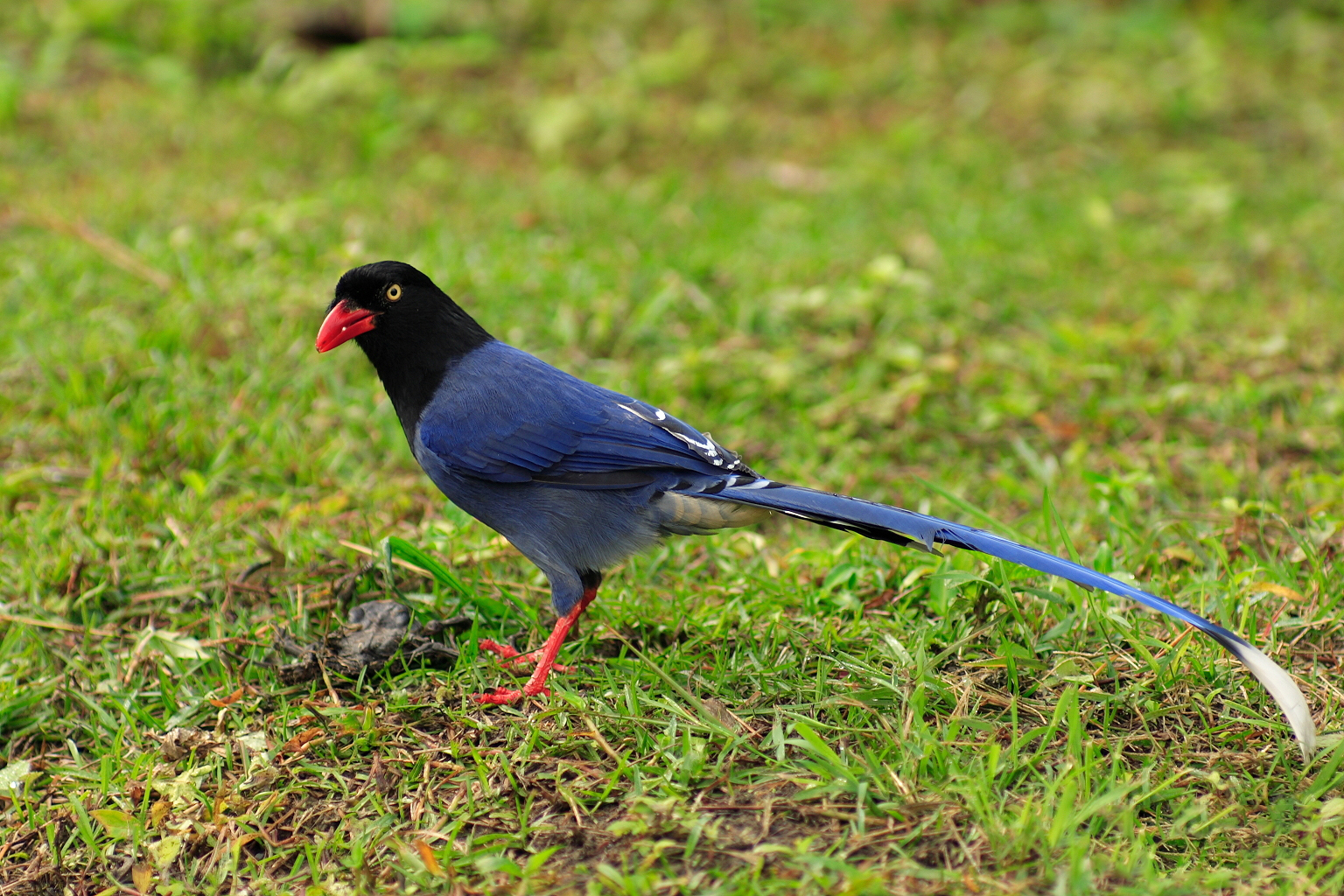
Taiwan blue magpie

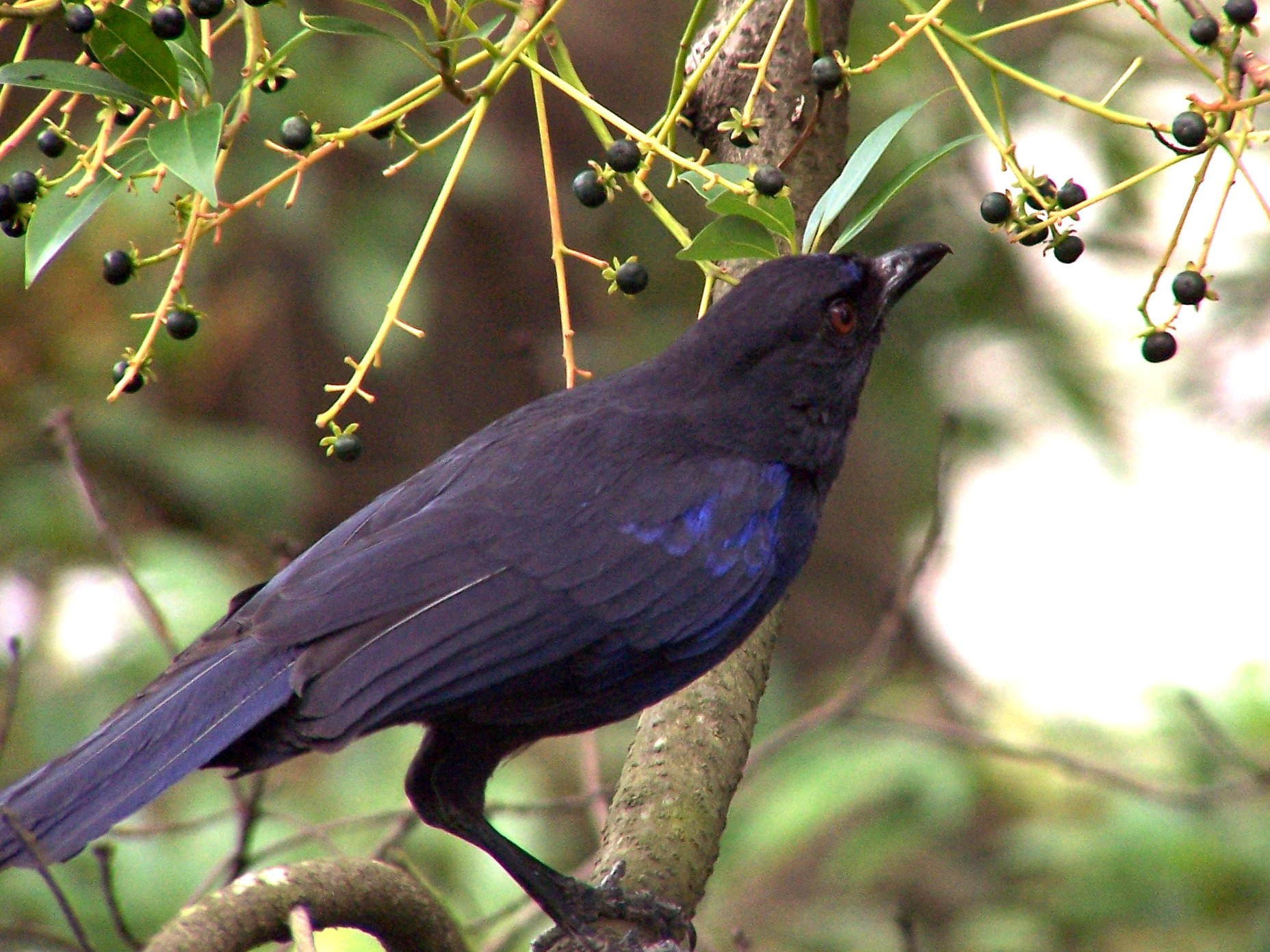
Taiwan whistling thrush

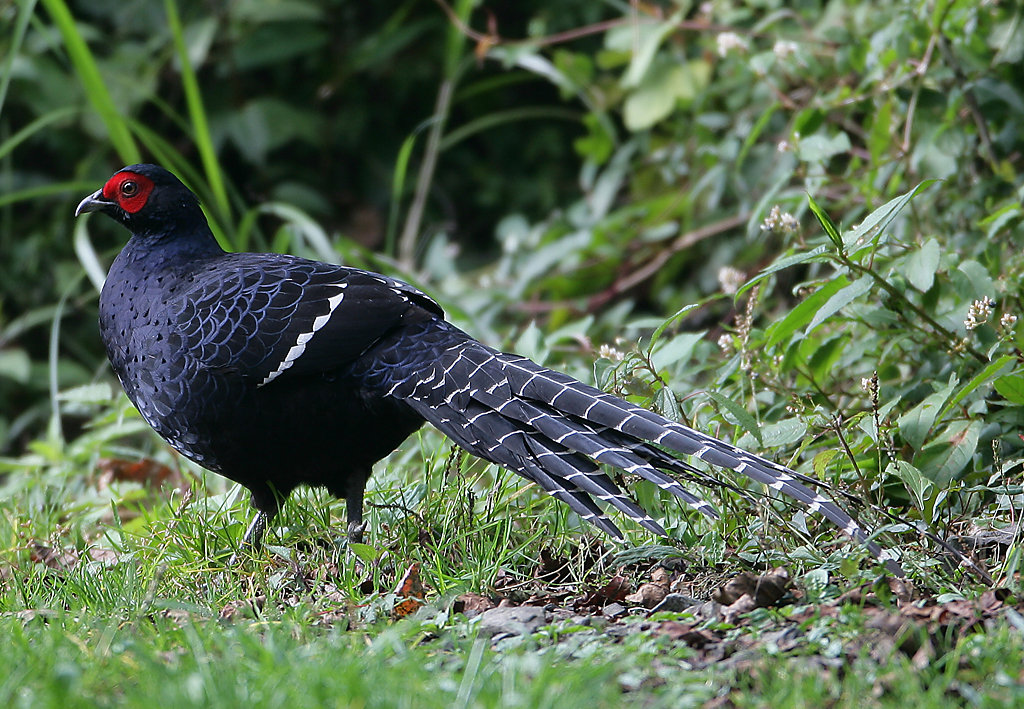
Mikado pheasant

32 endemic bird species and another 52 endemic subspecies of Taiwan have been identified (out of a total of 686 bird species). The thirty-two endemic species make up about 4.6% of all birds living in Taiwan.

- Order Passeriformes (passerines and relatives)
  - Taiwan yellow tit – Machlolophus holsti
  - Chestnut-bellied tit – Sittiparus castaneoventris
  - White-whiskered laughingthrush – Garrulax morrisonianus (Ogilvie-Grant)
  - White-throated laughingthrush – Pterorhinus albogularis
  - Rusty laughingthrush – Pterorhinus poecilorhynchus
  - White-eared sibia – Heterophasia auricularis (Swinhoe)
  - Taiwan yuhina – Yuhina brunneiceps Ogilvie-Grant
  - Taiwan scimitar babbler – Pomatorhinus musicus
  - Black-necklaced scimitar babbler – Erythrogenys erythrocnemis
  - Taiwan cupwing – Pnoepyga formosana
  - Taiwan barwing – Actinodura morrisoniana Ogilvie-Grant
  - Steere's liocichla – Liocichla steerii Swinhoe
  - Morrison's fulvetta – Alcippe morrisonia
  - Taiwan blue magpie – Urocissa caerulea (Gould)
  - Styan's bulbul – Pycnonotus taivanus Styan
  - Taiwan whistling thrush – Myophonus insularis Gould
  - Collared bush robin – Tarsiger johnstoniae (Ogilvie-Grant)
  - White-browed bush robin – Tarsiger indicus
  - Taiwan bullfinch – Pyrrhula owstoni
  - Taiwan rosefinch – Carpodacus formosanus
  - Taiwan vivid niltava – Niltava vivida
  - Taiwan thrush – Turdus niveiceps
  - Taiwan shortwing – Brachypteryx goodfellowi
  - Taiwan fulvetta – Fulvetta formosana
  - Flamecrest – Regulus goodfellowi Ogilvie-Grant
  - Taiwan bush warbler – Bradypterus alishanensis
  - Taiwan hwamei – Garrulax taewanus
- Order Galliformes (chicken-like birds)
  - Taiwan partridge – Arborophila crudigularis (Swinhoe)
  - Taiwan bamboo partridge – Bambusicola sonorivox
  - Mikado pheasant – Syrmaticus mikado (Ogilvie-Grant)
  - Swinhoe's pheasant – Lophura swinhoii (Gould)
- Order Piciformes (woodpeckers and relatives)
  - Taiwan barbet – Megalaima nuchalis

=== Endemic reptiles ===
- Order Squamata (lizards and snakes)
  - Formosan smooth skink – Scincella formosensis (Van Denburgh)
  - Taiwan forest skink – Sphenomorphus taiwanensis Chen & Lue
  - Plestiodon leucostictus (Hikida, 1988)
  - Lanyu scaly-toed gecko – Lepidodactylus yami Ota
  - Kikuchi's gecko – Gekko kikuchii (Oshima)
  - Gekko guishanicus – Lin & Yao, 2016
  - Short-legged japalure – Diploderma brevipes Gressitt
  - Diploderma luei – Ota, Chen & Shang, 1998
  - Maki's japalura – Diploderma makii Ota
  - Swinhoe's japalura – Diploderma swinhonis Gunther
  - Formosan legless lizard – Ophisaurus formosensis Kishida
  - Formosa grass lizard – Takydromus formosanus Boulenger
  - Sauteri grass lizard – Takydromus sauteri Van Denburgh
  - Hsuehshan grass lizard – Takydromus hsuehshanensis Lin & Cheng
  - Stejneger's grass lizard – Takydromus stejnegeri Van Denburgh
  - Hengchun blind snake – Argyrophis koshunensis Oshima
  - Atayal slug-eating snake – Pareas atayal You, Poyarkov & Lin, 2015
  - Taiwan slug-eating snake – Pareas formosensis (Van Dengurgh)
  - Formosa odd-scaled snake – Achalinus formosanus Boulenger
  - Black odd-scaled snake – Achalinus niger Maki
  - Maki's keelback – Hebius miyajimae Maki
  - Swinhoe's grass snake – Rhabdophis swinhonis (Günther)
  - Formosa coral snake – Sinomicrurus sauteri (Steindachner)
  - Swinhoe's temperate Asian coralsnake – Sinomicrurus swinhoei (Van Dengurgh)
  - Taiwan pit viper – Trimeresurus gracilis Oshima

=== Endemic amphibians ===
- Order Anura (frogs and toads)
  - Central Formosa toad – Bufo bankorensis
  - Stejneger's narrow-mouthed toad – Micryletta steinegeri
  - Swinhoe's brown frog – Odorrana swinhoana
  - Taipa frog – Rana longicrus
  - Sauter's brown frog – Rana sauteri
  - Ota's stream tree frog – Buergeria otai
  - Robust Buerger's frog – Buergeria robusta
  - Kurixalus berylliniris
  - Temple treefrog – Kurixalus idiootocus
  - Kurixalus wangi
  - Farmland green treefrog – Zhangixalus arvalis
  - Orange-belly treefrog – Zhangixalus aurantiventris
  - Moltrecht's green tree frog – Rhacophorus moltrechti
  - Emerald green treefrog – Rhacophorus prasinatus
  - Taipei tree frog – Zhangixalus taipeianus
- Order Urodela (salamanders and newts)
  - Alishan salamander – Hynobius arisanensis
  - Formosan salamander – Hynobius formosanus
  - Taiwan lesser salamander – Hynobius fuca
  - Nanhu salamander – Hynobius glacialis
  - Sonani's salamander – Hynobius sonani

=== Endemic freshwater fishes ===
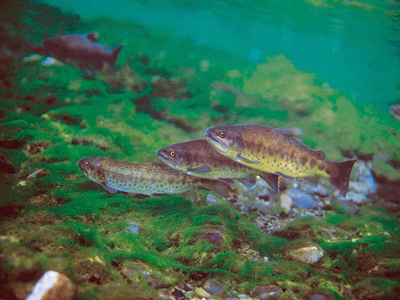
Formosan landlocked salmon

- Order Cypriniformes (minnows and carp)
  - Taitung river loach – Hemimyzon taitungensis Tzeng & Shen
  - Formosan river loach – Hemimyzon formosanus (Boulenger)
  - Shen's river loach – Hemimyzon sheni Chen & Fang
  - River loach – Formosania lacustris (Steindachner)
  - Pulin river loach – Sinogastromyzon puliensis Liang
  - Metzia mesembrinum (Regan)
  - Pararasbora moltrechti Regan
  - Acrossocheilus paradoxus (Günther)
  - Lake Candidus dace – Candidia barbata (Regan)
  - Microphysogobio alticorpus Banarescu & Nalbant
  - Taiwan ku fish – Onychostoma alticorpus (Oshima)
  - Freshwater minnow – Opsariichthys pachycephalus Günther
  - Gobiobotia cheni Banarescu & Nalbant
  - Microphysogobio brevirostris (Günther)
  - Aphyocypris kikuchii (Oshima)
  - Squalidus iijimae (Oshima)
- Order Gobiiformes (gobies and their relatives)
  - Goby – Cryptocentrus yatsui Tomiyama
  - Goby – Myersina yangii (Chen)
  - Goby – Rhinogobius candidianus Regan
  - Goby – Rhinogobius gigas Aonuma & Chen
  - Goby – Rhinogobius formosanus Oshima
  - Goby – Rhinogobius nantaiensis Aonuma & Chen
  - Goby – Rhinogobius henchuenensis Chen & Shao
  - Goby – Rhinogobius delicatus Chen & Shao
  - Goby – Rhinogobius maculafasciatus Chen & Shao
  - Goby – Rhinogobius rubromaculatus Lee & Chang
  - Goby – Rhinogobius lanyuensis Chen, Miller & Fang
- Order Siluriformes (catfishes)
  - Formosan torrent catfish – Liobagrus formosanus Regan
  - Bagrid catfish – Pseudobagrus adiposalis Oshima
  - Bagrid catfish – Pseudobagrus brevianalis Regan
- Order Osmeriformes (smelts, galaxiids, and relatives)
  - Ariake icefish – Neosalanx acuticeps Regan (endangered)
- Order Salmoniformes (salmons and trouts)
  - Formosan landlocked salmon – Oncorhynchus formosanus (Jordan & Oshima)

== Endemic flora ==
Taiwan is home to several hundred endemic plant species and subspecies, including four endemic genera – Conjugatovarium, Kudoacanthus, Shaolinchiana, and Tangshuia. Plants are sorted by family.

=== Acanthaceae ===
- Dicliptera longiflora Hayata
- Hygrophila pogonocalyx Hayata
- Kudoacanthus Hosok.
  - Kudoacanthus albonervosus Hosok.
- Lepidagathis palinensis S.S.Ying
- Rungia taiwanensis T.Yamaz.
- Strobilanthes chihsinlinensis S.S.Ying
- Strobilanthes formosana S.Moore
- Strobilanthes lanyuensis Seok, C.F.Hsieh & J.Murata
- Strobilanthes longespicata Hayata
- Strobilanthes taiwanensis S.S.Ying

=== Actinidiaceae ===
- Actinidia chinensis var. setosa H.L.Li
- Celosia taitoensis Hayata

=== Amaranthaceae ===
- Amaranthus shengkuangensis S.S.Ying

=== Amaryllidaceae ===
- Allium taiwanianum S.S.Ying

=== Apiaceae ===
- Angelica dahurica var. formosana (H.Boissieu) Yen
- Angelica hohuanshanensis S.S.Ying
- Angelica morrisonicola Hayata
- Angelica tarokoensis Hayata
- Anthriscus taiwanensis S.S.Ying
- Bupleurum kaoi Liu, C.Y.Chao & Chuang
- Chaerophyllum involucratum (Hayata) K.F.Chung
- Chaerophyllum nanhuense (Chih H.Chen & J.C.Wang) K.F.Chung
- Chaerophyllum taiwanianum (Masam.) K.F.Chung
- Cnidium monnieri var. formosanum (Y.Yabe) Kitag.
- Cnidium warburgii H.Wolff
- Conioselinum morrisonense Hayata
- Pimpinella niitakayamensis Hayata
- Pimpinella tagawae M.Hiroe

=== Apocynaceae ===
- Anodendron benthamianum Hemsl.
- Cynanchum lanhsuense T.Yamaz.
- Melodinus angustifolius Hayata
- Trachelospermum tulinense S.S.Ying
- Vincetoxicum insulicola Meve & Liede
- Vincetoxicum lui (Y.H.Tseng & C.T.Chao) Meve & Liede
- Vincetoxicum oshimae (Hayata) Meve & Liede
- Vincetoxicum sui (Y.H.Tseng & C.T.Chao) T.C.Hsu
- Vincetoxicum taiwanense (Hatus.) T.C.Hsu

=== Aquifoliaceae ===
- Ilex arisanensis Yamam.
- Ilex guanwuensis S.S.Ying
- Ilex hayatana Loes.
- Ilex hengchunensis S.S.Ying
- Ilex lonicerifolia Hayata
  - Ilex lonicerifolia var. hakkuensis (Yamam.) S.Y.Hu
  - Ilex lonicerifolia var. lonicerifolia
  - Ilex lonicerifolia var. matsudae (Yamam.) Yamam.
- Ilex matsudae Yamam.
- Ilex nokoensis Hayata
- Ilex parvifolia Hayata
- Ilex rarasanensis Sasaki
- Ilex rubroantheriana S.S.Ying
- Ilex suzukii S.Y.Hu
- Ilex tugitakayamensis Sasaki
- Ilex yunnanensis var. parvifolia (Hayata) S.Y.Hu

=== Araceae ===
- Amorphophallus henryi N.E.Br.
- Amorphophallus hirtus N.E.Br.
- Arisaema consanguineum subsp. kelung-insulare (Hayata) Gusman
- Arisaema formosanum (Hayata) Hayata
- Arisaema guanwuense S.S.Ying
- Arisaema ilanense J.C.Wang
- Arisaema taiwanense J.Murata
  - Arisaema taiwanense var. brevipedunculatum J.Murata
  - Arisaema taiwanense var. taiwanense
- Arisaema thunbergii subsp. autumnale J.C.Wang, J.Murata & H.Ohashi
- Arum taiwanianum S.S.Ying
- Homalomena kelungensis Hayata
- Rhaphidophora formosana Engl.

=== Araliaceae ===
- Aralia castanopsicola (Hayata) J.Wen – northern & central Taiwan
- Aralia decaisneana Hance
- Dendropanax pellucidopunctatus (Hayata) Kaneh.
- Fatsia polycarpa Hayata
- Hedera rhombea var. formosana (Nakai) H.L.Li
- Hedera siyuanwukouensis S.S.Ying
- Heptapleurum taiwanianum (Nakai) G.M.Plunkett & Lowry
- Hydrocotyle setulosa Hayata
- Sinopanax formosanus (Hayata) H.L.Li

=== Arecaceae ===
- Arenga engleri Becc.
- Calamus beccarii A.J.Hend. – southwestern Taiwan
- Calamus formosanus Becc.
- Pinanga tashiroi Hayata

=== Aristolochiaceae ===
- Aristolochia cucurbitifolia Hayata
- Aristolochia hohuanensis S.S.Ying
- Aristolochia pahsienshanianum (C.T.Lu, C.Lan Yang & J.C.Wang) S.S.Ying
- Aristolochia yujungiana C.T.Lu & J.C.Wang
- Asarum ampulliflorum C.T.Lu & J.C.Wang
- Asarum chatienshanianum C.T.Lu & J.C.Wang – northern Taiwan
- Asarum crassisepalum S.F.Huang, T.H.Hsieh & T.C.Huang
- Asarum hypogynum Hayata
- Asarum macranthum Hook.f. – northern Taiwan
- Asarum pubitessellatum C.T.Lu & J.C.Wang
- Asarum shoukaense S.S.Ying
- Asarum taipingshanianum S.F.Huang, T.H.Hsieh & T.C.Huang
- Asarum tawushanianum C.T.Lu & J.C.Wang - southern Taiwan
- Asarum tungyanshanianum S.S.Ying
- Asarum villisepalum C.T.Lu & J.C.Wang

=== Asparagaceae ===
- Aspidistra attenuata Hayata – central and southern Taiwan
- Aspidistra daibuensis Hayata – southeastern and southern Taiwan
  - Aspidistra daibuensis var. daibuensis – southeastern and southern Taiwan
  - Aspidistra daibuensis var. longkiauensis C.T.Lu, Ming Jen Yang & J.C.Wang
- Aspidistra longiconnectiva C.T.Lu, K.C.Chuang & J.C.Wang
- Aspidistra mushaensis Hayata – central Taiwan
- Aspidistra shoukaensis S.S.Ying
- Disporopsis shaolinchiensis S.S.Ying
- Heteropolygonatum alte-lobatum (Hayata) Y.H.Tseng, H.Y.Tzeng & C.T.Chao
- Maianthemum formosanum (Hayata) LaFrankie
- Maianthemum harae Y.H.Tseng & C.T.Chao
- Maianthemum shaolinchii S.S.Ying
- Ophiopogon shuangliuensis S.S.Ying
- Peliosanthes kaoi Ohwi – southeastern Taiwan (Taidong Xian)
- Polygonatum arisanense Hayata
  - Polygonatum arisanense var. arisanense
  - Polygonatum arisanense var. chingshuishanianum (S.S.Ying) C.T.Chao & Y.H.Tseng
  - Polygonatum arisanense var. formosanum (Hayata) C.T.Chao & Y.H.Tseng

=== Aspleniaceae ===
- Asplenium cuneatiforme Christ
- Asplenium matsumurae Christ
- Asplenium subtrialatum (Seriz.) Y.H.Chang
- Asplenium × wangii C.M.Kuo (A. bullatum × A. wrightii)
- Asplenium wilfordii var. densum Rosenst.
- Athyrium erythropodum Hayata
- Athyrium leiopodum (Hayata) Tagawa
- Athyrium tripinnatum Tagawa
- Diplazium chioui T.C.Hsu
- Diplazium ketagalaniorum T.C.Hsu
- Diplazium kuoi T.C.Hsu
- Hymenasplenium adiantifrons (Hayata) Viane & S.Y.Dong
- Thelypteris × erubesquirolica W.C.Shieh & J.L.Tsai (T. erubescens × T. esquirolii)
- Thelypteris longipetiolata (K.Iwats.) K.Iwats.
- Woodsia okamotoi Tagawa

=== Asteraceae ===
- Ainsliaea chaochiei S.S.Ying
- Ainsliaea lalashanensis S.S.Ying
- Ainsliaea paucicapitata Hayata
- Anaphalis horaimontana Masam.
- Anaphalis nagasawae Hayata
- Anaphalis transnokoensis Sasaki
- Artemisia kawakamii Hayata
- Artemisia morrisonensis Hayata
- Artemisia niitakayamensis Hayata
- Artemisia oligocarpa Hayata
- Artemisia somae Hayata
  - Artemisia somae var. batakensis (Hayata) Kitam.
  - Artemisia somae var. somae
- Artemisia tsugitakaensis (Kitam.) Y.Ling & Y.R.Ling
- Aster altaicus var. taitoensis Kitam. - southeastern Taiwan
- Aster chingshuiensis Y.C.Liu & C.H.Ou
- Aster guanwuensis S.S.Ying
- Aster ilanmontanus S.S.Ying
- Aster itsunboshi Kitam.
- Aster kanoi S.W.Chung, W.J.Huang & T.C.Hsu
- Aster morrisonensis Hayata
- Aster oldhamii Hemsl. – northern Taiwan
- Aster ovalifolius Kitam.
- Aster siyuanensis S.S.Ying
- Aster taiwanensis var. taiwanensis
- Aster takasago-montanus Sasaki
- Aster taoshanensis S.S.Ying
- Aster taoyuenensis S.S.Ying
- Blumea chishangensis S.W.Chung, Z.Hao Chen, S.H.Liu & W.J.Huang
- Blumea hsinbaiyangensis S.S.Ying
- Blumea humilis S.S.Ying
- Blumea linearis C.I Peng & W.P.Leu
- Blumea luoshaoensis S.S.Ying
- Carpesium parvicapitulum S.S.Ying
- Carpesium taiwanense S.S.Ying
- Chrysanthemum horaimontanum Masam.
- Chrysanthemum morii Hayata
- Cirsium arisanense Kitam.
- Cirsium chilaishanense S.S.Ying
- Cirsium ferum Kitam.
- Cirsium guanwuense S.S.Ying
- Cirsium nanhutashanense S.S.Ying
- Cirsium pitouchaoense S.S.Ying
- Cirsium suzukii Kitam. – northern Taiwan
- Cirsium taiwanense Y.H.Tseng & Chih Y.Chang
- Cirsium tatakaense Y.H.Tseng, Y.H.Tseng, Chih Y.Chang & C.Y.Chang
- Crepidiastrum hualienianum S.S.Ying
- Crepidiastrum taiwanianum Nakai
- Crepis meifenggensis S.S.Ying
- Erigeron fukuyamae Kitam.
- Erigeron morrisonensis Hayata
- Erigeron taiwanensis S.S.Ying
- Eupatorium amabile Kitam.
- Eupatorium guanyuanense S.S.Ying
- Eupatorium hualienense C.H.Ou, S.W.Chung & C.I Peng
- Eupatorium loshanense S.S.Ying
- Eupatorium tashiroi Hayata
- Gynura formosana Kitam.
- Gynura taitungensis S.S.Ying
- Gynura tungyanshanensis S.S.Ying
- Hieracium morii Hayata
- Hieracium taiwanense S.S.Ying
- Inula taiwanensis S.S.Ying
- Ixeridium calcicola C.I Peng, S.W.Chung & T.C.Hsu
- Ixeridium guanwuense S.S.Ying
- Ixeridium hohuanshanense S.S.Ying
- Ixeridium sandaiolingwaterfallense S.S.Ying
- Ixeridium transnokoense (Sasaki) Pak & Kawano
- Ixeris hopingtunnelensis S.S.Ying
- Jacobaea kuanshanensis (C.I Peng & S.W.Chung) S.S.Ying
- Jacobaea morrisonensis (Hayata) S.S.Ying
- Jacobaea tarokoensis (C.I Peng) S.S.Ying
- Lactuca mansuensis Hayata
- Lapsanastrum takasei (Sasaki) Pak & K.Bremer
- Launaea taiwanensis S.S.Ying
- Leontopodium microphyllum Hayata
- Ligularia kojimae Kitam.
- Melanthera taiwanensis S.S.Ying
- Nemosenecio formosanus (Kitam.) B.Nord.
- Paraprenanthes nanhutashanensis S.S.Ying
- Paraprenanthes shaolinchiensis S.S.Ying
- Paraprenanthes yangtoushanensis S.S.Ying
- Parasenecio morrisonensis Ying Liu, C.I Peng & Q.E.Yang
- Parasenecio nokoensis (Masam. & S.Suzuki) C.I Peng & S.W.Chung
- Parasenecio sylviaensis S.W.Chung & T.C.Hsu
- Pertya simozawae Masam.
- Petasites formosanus Kitam.
- Picris angustifolia subsp. morrisonensis (Hayata) S.S.Ying
- Picris angustifolia subsp. ohwiana (Kitam.) S.S.Ying
- Saussurea glandulosa Kitam.
- Saussurea kanzanensis Kitam.
- Saussurea kiraisiensis Masam.
- Scorzonera taiwanensis S.S.Ying
- Senecio bilushenmulatus S.S.Ying
- Senecio loshanensis S.S.Ying
- Senecio scandens var. crataegifolius (Hayata) Kitam.
- Senecio shaoakoulatus S.S.Ying
- Senecio tulinensis S.S.Ying
- Syneilesis hayatae Kitam.
- Syneilesis subglabrata (Yamam. & Sasaki) Kitam.
- Taraxacum hohuanshanense S.S.Ying
- Tephroseris taitoensis (Hayata) Holub
- Youngia japonica subsp. monticola Koh Nakam. & C.I Peng
- Youngia lalashanensis S.S.Ying
- Youngia macrophylla S.S.Ying

=== Balsaminaceae ===
- Impatiens devolii T.C.Huang
- Impatiens tayemonii Hayata
- Impatiens uniflora Hayata

=== Begoniaceae ===
- Begonia austrotaiwanensis Y.K.Chen & C.I.Peng - southern Taiwan
- Begonia bouffordii C.I Peng – Nantou
- Begonia × buimontana Yamam. (B. palmata × B. taiwaniana)
- Begonia chitoensis Tang S.Liu & M.J.Lai – northern and central Taiwan
- Begonia × chungii C.I Peng & S.M.Ku (B. longifolia × B. palmata)
- Begonia chuyunshanensis C.I Peng & Y.K.Chen – southern Taiwan
- Begonia hohuanensis S.S.Ying
- Begonia lukuana Y.C.Liu & C.H.Ou
- Begonia nantoensis M.J.Lai – Nantou
- Begonia pinglinensis C.I Peng – northern Taiwan
- Begonia ravenii C.I.Peng & Y.K.Chen – western Taiwan
- Begonia shitoushanensis S.S.Ying
- Begonia shoukaensis S.S.Ying
- Begonia × taipeiensis C.I.Peng (B. formosana × B. longifolia) – northern Taiwan
- Begonia taiwaniana Hayata – southern Taiwan
- Begonia tengchiana C.I Peng & Y.K.Chen – south-central Taiwan
- Begonia tungyanshanensis S.S.Ying
- Begonia wutaiana C.I Peng & Y.K.Chen – south-central Taiwan

=== Berberidaceae ===
- Berberis alpicola C.K.Schneid. – Mt. Alishan
- Berberis aristatoserrulata Hayata – central Taiwan
- Berberis brevisepala Hayata – central Taiwan
- Berberis chingshuiensis Shimizu – east-central Taiwan
- Berberis hayatana Mizush. – north-central Taiwan
- Berberis japonica (Thunb.) Spreng.
- Berberis kawakamii Hayata – central Taiwan
- Berberis mingetsensis Hayata – west-central Taiwan
- Berberis morii Harber & C.C.Yu – eastern Taiwan
- Berberis morrisonensis Hayata
- Berberis nantoensis C.K.Schneid. – northern and north-central Taiwan
- Berberis pengii C.C.Yu & K.F.Chung – southern Taiwan
- Berberis ravenii C.C.Yu & K.F.Chung – southern Taiwan
- Berberis schaaliae C.C.Yu & K.F.Chung – eastern Taiwan
- Berberis tarokoensis S.Y.Lu & Yuen P.Yang – north-central Taiwan

=== Betulaceae ===
- Alnus formosana (Burkill) Makino
- Alnus henryi C.K.Schneid.
- Carpinus hebestroma Yamam. – Hualien Xian
- Carpinus kawakamii var. minutiserrata (Hayata) S.S.Ying
- Carpinus rankanensis Hayata
  - Carpinus rankanensis var. mutsudae Yamam.

=== Boraginaceae ===
- Cynoglossum alpestre Ohwi – above 2500 m elevation
- Ehretia lengshuikengensis S.S.Ying
- Heliotropium formosanum I.M.Johnst
- Thyrocarpus cuifengensis S.S.Ying
- Trichodesma calycosum var. formosanum (Matsum.) I.M.Johnst.
- Trigonotis formosana var. elevatovenosa (Hayata) S.D.Shen & J.C.Wang – northern Taiwan
- Trigonotis nankotaizanensis (Sasaki) Masam. & Ohwi

=== Brassicaceae ===
- Arabis piluchiensis S.S.Ying
- Arabis shengkuangshanensis S.S.Ying
- Arabis taihumilis S.S.Ying
- Barbarea taiwaniana Ohwi – northern Taiwan
- Brassica taiwanensis S.S.Ying
- Draba sekiyana Ohwi – Taiwan mountains
- Thismia huangii P.Y.Jiang & T.H.Hsieh – northwestern Taiwan
- Thismia taiwanensis Sheng Z.Yang, R.M.K.Saunders & C.J.Hsu – south-central Taiwan (Gaoxiong)

=== Buxaceae ===
- Buxus sinica var. intermedia (Hatus.) M.Cheng
- Sarcococca taiwaniana J.M.H.Shaw, Wynn-Jones & T.Y.A.Yang

=== Campanulaceae ===
- Adenophora morrisonensis Hayata
  - Adenophora morrisonensis subsp. morrisonensis
  - Adenophora morrisonensis subsp. uehatae (Yamam.) Lammers
- Adenophora taiwaniana S.S.Ying
- Codonopsis kawakamii Hayata – central Taiwan
- Wahlenbergia taiwaniana S.S.Ying

=== Caprifoliaceae ===
- Lonicera kawakamii (Hayata) Masam.
- Lonicera taiwanensis S.S.Ying
- Lonicera tulinensis S.S.Ying
- Patrinia glabrifolia Yamam. & Sasaki – central and eastern Taiwan
- Scabiosa lacerifolia Hayata
- Valeriana hsui M.J.Jung
- Valeriana kawakamii Hayata
- Valeriana siyuaniana S.S.Ying

=== Caryophyllaceae ===
- Arenaria fulungensis S.S.Ying
- Arenaria siyuanakouensis S.S.Ying
- Arenaria taiwanensis S.S.Ying
- Cerastium morrisonense Hayata
- Cerastium nanhutashanense S.S.Ying
- Cerastium parvipetalum Hosok. – southern Taiwan
- Cerastium subpilosum Hayata – central Taiwan
- Cerastium takasagomontanum Masam. – central Taiwan
- Dianthus palinensis S.S.Ying – Taoyuan Xian: Bali
- Dianthus pygmaeus Hayata
- Dianthus taoshanensis S.S.Ying
- Nubelaria arisanensis (Hayata) M.T.Sharples & E.A.Tripp
- Silene morrisonmontana (Hayata) Ohwi & H.Ohashi
  - Silene morrisonmontana var. glabella (Ohwi) Ohwi & H.Ohashi – northern Taiwan
  - Silene morrisonmontana var. morrisonmontana
- Silene ohwii T.C.Hsu, C.K.Liao & S.W.Chung northern and central Taiwan
- Spergularia hohuanshanensis S.S.Ying
- Stellaria taiwanensis S.S.Ying

=== Celastraceae ===
- Euonymus spraguei Hayata
- Euonymus wulinensis S.S.Ying
- Glyptopetalum pallidifolium (Hayata) Q.R.Liu & S.Y.Meng

=== Clusiaceae ===
- Garcinia linii C.E.Chang – eastern Taiwan

=== Colchicaceae ===
- Disporum cantoniense var. kawakamii (Hayata) H.Hara
- Disporum kawakamii Hayata
- Disporum sessile var. intermedium (H.Hara) Y.H.Tseng & C.T.Chao – central Taiwan
- Disporum shimadae Hayata – northern Taiwan

=== Commelinaceae ===
- Commelina bicaeruloflora S.S.Ying
- Cyanotis kawakamii Hayata – southern Taiwan

=== Convolvulaceae ===
- Argyreia formosana Ishig. ex T.Yamaz. – southern Taiwan
- Ipomoea fangliaoensis S.S.Ying
- Ipomoea taiwanensis S.S.Ying

=== Crassulaceae ===
- Crassula nanshanchunensis (S.S.Ying) S.S.Ying
- Kalanchoe tachingshuii S.S.Ying
- Kalanchoe tashiroi Yamam. – southeastern Taiwan
- Phedimus subcapitatum (Hayata) S.S.Ying
- Sedum actinocarpum Yamam.
- Sedum arisanense Yamam.
- Sedum brachyrhinchum Yamam.
- Sedum cirenianum S.S.Ying
- Sedum erythrospermum subsp. erythrospermum
- Sedum kwanwuense H.W.Lin, J.C.Wang & C.T.Lu
- Sedum microsepalum Hayata – north-central Taiwan
- Sedum morrisonense Hayata
- Sedum nokoense Yamam.
- Sedum parviflorum S.S.Ying
- Sedum parvisepalum subsp. parvisepalum – central Taiwan
- Sedum sasakii Hayata – northern Taiwan
- Sedum sekiteiense Yamam. – northern Taiwan
- Sedum shaoakouense S.S.Ying
- Sedum shengkuangense S.S.Ying
- Sedum tachingshuianum S.S.Ying
- Sedum taiwanalpinum H.W.Lin, J.C.Wang & C.T.Lu
- Sedum taiwanianum S.S.Ying
- Sedum tarokoense H.W.Lin & J.C.Wang – eastern Taiwan
- Sedum triangulisepalum T.S.Liu & N.J.Chung ex T.C.Hsu & S.W.Chung
- Sinocrassula parvifoliana S.S.Ying
- Sinocrassula shaolinchiana S.S.Ying
- Sinocrassula taiwaniana S.S.Ying

=== Cucurbitaceae ===
- Sinobaijiania taiwaniana (Hayata) C.Jeffrey & W.J.de Wilde
- Trichosanthes homophylla Hayata
- Trichosanthes taiwanensis S.S.Ying

=== Cupressaceae ===
- Calocedrus formosana (Florin) Florin – northern and central Taiwan
- Chamaecyparis formosensis Matsum. – northern and central Taiwan
- Chamaecyparis obtusa var. formosana (Hayata) Hayata – northern and central Taiwan
- Juniperus morrisonicola Hayata
- Juniperus tairukouensis S.S.Ying
- Juniperus tsukusiensis var. taiwanensis (R.P.Adams & C.F.Hsieh) R.P.Adams – Mt. Chingshui

=== Cyatheaceae ===
- Cibotium taiwanense C.M.Kuo

=== Cyperaceae ===
- Carex ayako-maedae T.Koyama
- Carex caucasica subsp. jisaburo-ohwiana (T.Koyama) T.Koyama
- Carex dissitiflora subsp. taiwanensis (Ohwi) T.Koyama
- Carex dolichostachya subsp. trichosperma (Ohwi) T.Koyama – Mt. Alishan
- Carex fulvorubescens subsp. fulvorubescens
- Carex gentilis var. nakaharae (Hayata) T.Koyama
- Carex morii Hayata
- Carex orthostemon Hayata
- Carex urelytra Ohwi
- Fimbristylis shimadana Ohwi
- Fimbristylis subinclinata T.Koyama – eastern Taiwan

=== Daphniphyllaceae ===
- Daphniphyllum × lanyuense (T.C.Huang) M.S.Tang, S.H.Liu & Yuen P.Yang (D. macropodum × D. pentandrum) – Lan Yü

=== Dioscoreaceae ===
- Dioscorea formosana R.Knuth

=== Ebenaceae ===
- Diospyros fengchangensis S.Y.Lu
- Diospyros kotoensis T.Yamaz. – Lan Yü

=== Elaeagnaceae ===
- Elaeagnus darenensis S.S.Ying
- Elaeagnus formosana Nakai
- Elaeagnus formosensis Hatus. – southern Taiwan
- Elaeagnus grandifolia Hayata – central Taiwan
- Elaeagnus tarokoensis S.Y.Lu & Yuen P.Yang
- Elaeagnus thunbergii Servett.

=== Elaeocarpaceae ===
- Elaeocarpus decipiens var. changii Y.Tang – southern Taiwan
- Elaeocarpus hayatae Kaneh. & Sasaki – southern Taiwan including Lan Yü

=== Ericaceae ===
- Chimaphila monticola subsp. taiwaniana (Masam.) Hid.Takah.
- Gaultheria taiwaniana S.S.Ying – central Taiwan
- Pyrola alboreticulata Hayata
- Pyrola morrisonensis (Hayata) Hayata
- Rhododendron breviperulatum Hayata – northern and eastern Taiwan
- Rhododendron chilanshanense Kurash. – northern Taiwan (Mt. Chilan)
- Rhododendron chiliangense S.S.Ying
- Rhododendron formosanum Hemsl. – southern Taiwan
- Rhododendron huanshanense S.S.Ying
- Rhododendron hyperythrum Hayata
- †Rhododendron kanehirae E.H.Wilson – northern Taiwan (Peishi River). Last recorded in 1984
- Rhododendron kawakamii Hayata
- Rhododendron lasiostylum Hayata – central Taiwan
- Rhododendron longiperulatum Hayata – southern Taiwan
- Rhododendron morii Hayata - central Taiwan
- Rhododendron nakaharae Hayata – northern Taiwan
- Rhododendron nantouense S.S.Ying
- Rhododendron noriakianum T.Suzuki – northern and central Taiwan
- Rhododendron oldhamii Maxim.
- Rhododendron pachysanthum Hayata – central Taiwan
- Rhododendron pseudochrysanthum Hayata – central Taiwan
- Rhododendron rubropilosum Hayata – central Taiwan
  - Rhododendron rubropilosum var. grandiflorum T.Yamaz. – Nantou
  - Rhododendron rubropilosum var. rubropilosum – central Taiwan
- Rhododendron shaoakouense S.S.Ying
- Rhododendron sikayotaizanense Masam.
- Rhododendron taiwanalpinum Ohwi – central Taiwan
- Vaccinium delavayi subsp. merrillianum (Hayata) R.C.Fang
- Vaccinium dunalianum var. caudatifolium (Hayata) H.L.Li
- Vaccinium japonicum var. lasiostemon Hayata
- Vaccinium kengii C.E.Chang – northern and central Taiwan
- Vaccinium wrightii var. formosanum (Hayata) H.L.Li – eastern Taiwan

=== Euphorbiaceae ===
- Acalypha eastmostpointensis S.S.Ying
- Acalypha matsudae Hayata – Hengchun Peninsula
- Euphorbia garanbiensis Hayata – southern Taiwan
- Euphorbia hsinchuensis (S.C.Lin & S.M.Chaw) C.Y.Wu & J.S.Ma – Taiwan (Xinzhu)
- Euphorbia taihsiensis (Chaw & Koutnik) Oudejans – western Taiwan
- Euphorbia tarokoensis Hayata – eastern Taiwan (Hualien)
- Euphorbia tzitanshaniana S.S.Ying
- Excoecaria formosana var. formosana
- Excoecaria kawakamii Hayata – southern Taiwan including Lan Yü
- Mallotus paniculatus var. formosanus (Hayata) Hurus.

=== Fabaceae ===
- Astragalus nankotaizanensis Sasaki
- Astragalus nokoensis Sasaki – central Taiwan
- Bauhinia longiracemosa Hayata
- Crotalaria similis Hemsl. – Hengchun Peninsula
- Dendrolobium dispermum (Hayata) Schindl.
- Derris lasiantha Hayata
- Derris laxiflora Benth.
- Dumasia villosa subsp. bicolor (Hayata) H.Ohashi & Tateishi
- Glycine dolichocarpa Tateishi & H.Ohashi
- Glycine max subsp. formosana (Hosok.) Tateishi & H.Ohashi – northern and central Taiwan
- Hylodesmum taiwanianum S.S.Ying
- Indigofera byobiensis Hosok.
- Indigofera hopingensis S.S.Ying
- Indigofera ramulosissima Hosok.
- Indigofera taiwaniana T.C.Huang & M.J.Wu
- Maackia taiwanensis Hoshi & H.Ohashi
- Millettia pulchra var. microphylla Dunn
- Mucuna gigantea subsp. tashiroi (Hayata) H.Ohashi & Tateishi
- Ormosia formosana Kaneh.
- Ormosia hengchuniana T.C.Huang, S.F.Huang & K.C.Yang
- Smithia yehii C.M.Wang, Chih Y.Chang & Y.H.Tseng
- Sohmaea gracillima (Hemsl.) H.Ohashi & K.Ohashi – southern Taiwan
- Tephrosia ionophlebia Hayata
- Tephrosia purpurea var. glabra Hosok.
- Zornia intecta Mohlenbr.

=== Fagaceae ===
- Fagus hayatae Palib. ex Hayata – northern Taiwan
- Lithocarpus dodonaeifolius (Hayata) Hayata
- Lithocarpus formosanus (Skan) Hayata
- Lithocarpus kawakamii (Hayata) Hayata
- Lithocarpus lepidocarpus (Hayata) Hayata – central and southern Taiwan
- Lithocarpus nantoensis (Hayata) Hayata – central and southern Taiwan
- Lithocarpus shinsuiensis Hayata & Kaneh. – southern Taiwan
- Quercus hypophaea Hayata
- Quercus liaoi C.F.Shen
- Quercus longinux Hayata
- Quercus morii Hayata
- Quercus spinosa subsp. miyabei (Hayata) A.Camus – central Taiwan
- Quercus stenophylloides Hayata – central Taiwan
- Quercus tarokoensis Hayata – eastern Taiwan
- Quercus tatakaensis Tomiya

=== Gentianaceae ===
- Gentiana arisanensis Hayata
- Gentiana bambuseti T.Y.Hsieh, T.C.Hsu, S.M.Ku & C.I Peng – central Taiwan
- Gentiana davidi var. formosana (Hayata) T.N.Ho
- Gentiana flavomaculata Hayata
  - Gentiana flavomaculata subsp. flavomaculata
  - Gentiana flavomaculata subsp. tatakensis (Masam.) Halda – central Taiwan
- Gentiana kaohsiungensis Chih H.Chen & J.C.Wang
- Gentiana scabrida subsp. horaimontana (Masam.) Halda – central Taiwan
- Gentiana scabrida subsp. itzershanensis (T.S.Liu & C.C.Kuo) Halda – central Taiwan
- Gentiana scabrida subsp. scabrida
- Gentiana taiwanialbiflora S.S.Ying
- Gentiana taiwanica T.N.Ho
- Gentiana tarokoensis Chih H.Chen & J.C.Wang
- Gentiana zollingeri subsp. tentyoensis (Masam.) Halda – eastern Taiwan
- Lomatogonium chilaiensis Chih H.Chen & J.C.Wang – Mt. Chilaishan
- Swertia arisanensis Hayata – central and eastern Taiwan
- Swertia changii Sheng Z.Yang – central Taiwan
- Swertia tozanensis Hayata
- Tripterospermum alutaceofolium (T.S.Liu & C.C.Kuo) J.Murata – northern Taiwan
- Tripterospermum cordifolium (Yamam.) Satake
- Tripterospermum guanwuense S.S.Ying
- Tripterospermum hualienense T.C.Hsu & S.W.Chung
- Tripterospermum lanceolatum (Hayata) H.Hara ex Satake
- Tripterospermum lilungshanense Chih H.Chen & J.C.Wang – south-central Taiwan
- Tripterospermum microphyllum Harry Sm.
- Tripterospermum shaolinchianum S.S.Ying
- Tripterospermum taiwanense (Masam.) Satake – central and southern Taiwan

=== Geraniaceae ===
- Geranium hayatanum Ohwi
- Geranium suzukii Masam.

=== Gesneriaceae ===
- Lysionotus pauciflorus var. ikedae (Hatus.) W.T.Wang – Lan Yü
- Lysionotus tairukouensis S.S.Ying
- Rhynchotechum brevipedunculatum J.C.Wang
- Rhynchotechum lalashanense S.S.Ying
- Rhynchotechum uniflorum S.S.Ying
- Whytockia sasakii (Hayata) B.L.Burtt

=== Gleicheniaceae ===
- Dicranopteris tetraphylla (Rosenst.) C.M.Kuo

=== Grossulariaceae ===
- Ribes formosanum Hayata

=== Hydrangeaceae ===
- Deutzia taiwanensis (Maxim.) C.K.Schneid. – northern Taiwan
- Hydrangea lalashanensis S.S.Ying
- Hydrangea longifolia Hayata
- Hydrangea pingtungensis S.S.Ying
- Hydrangea taiwaniana Y.C.Liu & F.Y.Lu – central Taiwan

=== Hymenophyllaceae ===
- Hymenophyllum alishanense De Vol
- Hymenophyllum chamaecyparicola T.C.Hsu & Z.X.Chang
- Hymenophyllum devolii M.J.Lai
- Hymenophyllum exquisitum T.C.Hsu & Y.S.Chao
- Hymenophyllum okadae Masam.
- Hymenophyllum parallelocarpum Hayata
- Hymenophyllum semialatum T.C.Hsu – Mt. Tahan
- Hymenophyllum taiwanense (Tagawa) C.V.Morton

=== Hypericaceae ===
- Hypericum eastmostianum S.S.Ying
- Hypericum formosanum Maxim. – northern Taiwan
- Hypericum geminiflorum subsp. simplicistylum (Hayata) N.Robson – north-central and central Taiwan
- Hypericum gouanyuanianum S.S.Ying
- Hypericum lalashanense S.S.Ying
- Hypericum nagasawae Hayata – north-central and central Taiwan
- Hypericum nakamurae (Masam.) N.Robson – east-northeastern Taiwan (Hualian)
- Hypericum nokoense Ohwi east-central Taiwan
- Hypericum subalatum Hayata – northern and northeastern Taiwan

=== Iridaceae ===
- Iris formosana Ohwi – northeastern Taiwan
- Iris nantouensis S.S.Ying – central Taiwan

=== Isoetaceae ===
- Isoetes taiwanensis De Vol
  - Isoetes taiwanensis var. kinmenensis F.Y.Lu, H.H.Chen & Y.L.Hsueh
  - Isoetes taiwanensis var. taiwanensis

=== Iteaceae ===
- Itea parviflora Hemsl.

=== Juncaceae ===
- Juncus kuohii M.J.Jung
- Luzula formosana Ohwi – central Taiwan
- Luzula taiwaniana Satake

=== Lamiaceae ===
- Ajuga rubrobracteosa S.S.Ying
- Callicarpa hengchunensis S.S.Ying
- Callicarpa hypoleucophylla T.P.Lin & J.L.Wang – southern Taiwan
- Callicarpa lalashanensis S.S.Ying
- Callicarpa pilosissima Maxim.
- Callicarpa randaiensis Hayata
- Callicarpa remotiflora T.P.Lin & J.L.Wang – Hengchun Peninsula
- Callicarpa remotiserrulata Hayata – Hengchun Peninsula
- Callicarpa rubrocarpa S.S.Ying
- Callicarpa tikusikensis Masam. – northern Taiwan
- Callicarpa tungyanensis S.S.Ying
- Clerodendrum ohwii Kaneh. & Hatus.
- Clinopodium cirenianum S.S.Ying
- Clinopodium cuifengense S.S.Ying
- Clinopodium laxiflorum (Hayata) K.Mori
- Clinopodium loshanense S.S.Ying
- Clinopodium shaofengkouensis S.S.Ying
- Clinopodium wulinianum S.S.Ying
- Clinopodium wutaianum S.S.Ying
- Collinsonia macrobracteata (Masam.) Harley
- Comanthosphace formosana Ohwi
- Elsholtzia oldhamii Hemsl.
- Elsholtzia taiwanensis S.S.Ying
- Lamium taiwanense S.S.Ying
- Paraphlomis cauliflora S.S.Ying
- Paraphlomis parviflora C.Y.Wu & H.W.Li
- Paraphlomis tomentosocapitata Yamam.
- Platostoma taiwanense S.S.Ying
- Pogostemon formosanus Oliv.
- Pogostemon monticola T.C.Hsu, S.W.Chung, S.H.Liu & W.J.Huang
- Salvia hayatae Makino ex Hayata
  - Salvia hayatae var. hayatae
  - Salvia hayatae var. pinnata (Hayata) C.Y.Wu
- Salvia japonica var. formosana Murata – northern Taiwan
- Salvia muratae T.Yamaz.
- Salvia shaofengkouensis S.S.Ying
- Salvia siyuanensis S.S.Ying
- Scutellaria hsiehii T.H.Hsieh
- Scutellaria lilungensis S.S.Ying
- Scutellaria playfairii Kudô
  - Scutellaria playfairii var. playfairii
  - Scutellaria playfairii var. procumbens (Ohwi) C.Y.Wu & H.W.Li
- Scutellaria taiwanensis C.Y.Wu – Ali Shan
- Scutellaria tarokoensis T.Yamaz.
- Suzukia shikikunensis Kudô – central and eastern Taiwan
- Teucrium guanwuense S.S.Ying
- Teucrium taiwanianum T.H.Hsieh & T.C.Huang
- Teucrium taoshanense S.S.Ying

=== Lardizabalaceae ===
- Stauntonia hengchunensis S.S.Ying
- Stauntonia purpurea Y.C.Liu & F.Y.Lu – central Taiwan

=== Lauraceae ===
- Actinodaphne mushaensis (Hayata) Hayata
- Camphora kanahirae (Hayata) K.F.Chung & C.L.Hsieh
- Camphora officinarum var. nominale (Hatus. & Hayata) K.F.Chung & C.L.Hsieh – eastern and southern Taiwan
- Cinnamomum chingchuanium S.S.Ying
- Cinnamomum insularimontanum Hayata
- Cinnamomum kotoense Kaneh. & Sasaki – Lan Yü
- Cinnamomum osmophloeum Kaneh. – northern and central Taiwan
- Cinnamomum reticulatum Hayata
- Lindera akoensis Hayata
- Litsea akoensis Hayata
  - Litsea akoensis var. akoensis
  - Litsea akoensis var. sasakii (Kamik.) J.C.Liao
- Litsea hayatae Kaneh.
- Litsea hypophaea Hayata
- Litsea morrisonensis Hayata
- Machilus konishii Hayata – central and southern Taiwan
- Machilus obovatifolius (Hayata) Kaneh. & Sasaki – southern Taiwan
  - Machilus obovatifolius var. obovatifolius – southern Taiwan
  - Machilus obovatifolius var. taiwuensis S.Y.Lu & T.T.Chen – southeastern Taiwan
- Machilus zuihoensis Hayata
  - Machilus zuihoensis var. mushaensis (F.Y.Lu) Y.C.Liu
  - Machilus zuihoensis var. zuihoensis
- Neolitsea acuminatissima (Hayata) Kaneh. & Sasaki
- Neolitsea buisanensis f. sutsuoensis J.C.Liao – southern Taiwan
- Neolitsea daibuensis Kamik. – southern Taiwan
- Neolitsea hiiranensis Tang S.Liu & J.C.Liao – southern Taiwan
- Neolitsea parvigemma (Hayata) Kaneh. & Sasaki – south-central Taiwan
- Neolitsea variabillima (Hayata) Kaneh. & Sasaki – central Taiwan
- Sassafras randaiense (Hayata) Rehder – central and southern Taiwan

=== Liliaceae ===
- Lilium formosanum A.Wallace
- Lilium lalashanense S.S.Ying
- Lilium linearifolianum S.S.Ying
- Lilium longiflorum var. scabrum Masam.
- Lilium × shimenianum S.S.Ying
- Tricyrtis bilushenmulata S.S.Ying
- Tricyrtis formosana var. glandosa (T.Shimizu) T.S.Liu & S.S.Ying – northeastern and central Taiwan
- Tricyrtis lasiocarpa Matsum. – western and southern Taiwan
- Tricyrtis suzukii Masam. – northeastern Taiwan
- Tricyrtis × tachingshuii S.S.Ying
- Tricyrtis uniflora S.S.Ying

=== Linderniaceae ===
- Lindernia sandaiolingensis S.S.Ying
- Vandellia scutellariiformis (T.Yamaz.) T.Yamaz. – Tainan Xian

=== Loranthaceae ===
- Loranthus kaoi (J.M.Chao) H.S.Kiu
- Scurrula phoebe-formosanae (Hayata) Danser
- Taxillus limprichtii var. ritozanensis (Hayata) F.Y.Lu & C.H.Ou
- Taxillus liquidambaricola var. liquidambaricola
- Taxillus nigrans var. longifolius (S.T.Chiu) F.Y.Lu & C.H.Ou
- Taxillus pseudochinensis (Yamam.) Danser – southern Taiwan
- Taxillus theifer (Hayata) H.S.Kiu
- Taxillus tsaii S.T.Chiu – southern Taiwan

=== Lycopodiaceae ===
- Huperzia changii (T.Y.Hsieh) Ralf Knapp – Last recorded in 2010
- Huperzia myriophyllifolia (Hayata) Holub
- Lycopodium yueshanense C.M.Kuo

=== Lythraceae ===
- Rotala taiwaniana Y.C.Liu & F.Y.Lu – eastern Taiwan

=== Magnoliaceae ===
- Magnolia kachirachirai (Kaneh. & Yamam.) Dandy – southeastern Taiwan

=== Malvaceae ===
- Corchorus aestuans var. brevicaulis (Hosok.) T.S.Liu & H.C.Lo
- Hibiscus indicus var. integrilobus (S.Y.Hu) K.M.Feng – southern Taiwan (Hengchun)
- Hibiscus taiwanensis S.Y.Hu – Alishan
- Melochia taiwaniana S.S.Ying
- Sida austrotaiwaniana S.S.Ying

=== Marrataceae ===
- Angiopteris × itoi (Shieh) J.M.Camus (A. lygodiifolia × A. somae)

=== Mazaceae ===
- Mazus alpinus Masam.
- Mazus fauriei Bonati – northern Taiwan
- Mazus lalashanensis S.S.Ying
- Mazus somggangensis S.S.Ying
- Mazus tainanensis T.H.Hsieh – Tainan city
- Mazus uniflorus S.S.Ying

=== Melanthiaceae ===
- Helonias umbellata (Baker) N.Tanaka
- Paris taiwanensis S.S.Ying
- Trillium taiwanense S.S.Ying – eastern Taiwan
- Veratrum formosanum O.Loes.

=== Melastomataceae ===
- Bredia dulanica C.L.Yeh, S.W.Chung & T.C.Hsu
- Bredia hirsuta var. scandens Ito & Matsum.
- Bredia oldhamii Hook.f.
- Medinilla formosana Hayata
- Medinilla hayatana H.Keng – Lan Yü
- Melastoma kudoi Sasaki – central Taiwan
- Melastoma scaberrimum (Hayata) Yuen P.Yang & H.Y.Liu
- Memecylon pendulum Chih C.Wang, Y.H.Tseng, Y.T.Chen & Kun C.Chang
- Tashiroea laisherana (C.L.Yeh & C.R.Yeh) R.C.Zhou & Ying Liu

=== Meliaceae ===
- Aglaia taiwaniana S.S.Ying

=== Menispermaceae ===
- Cocculus taiwanianus S.S.Ying
- Cyclea ochiaiana (Yamam.) S.F.Huang & T.C.Huang
- Paratinospora dentata (Diels) Wei Wang
- Stephania merrillii Diels

=== Mitrastemonaceae ===
- Mitrastemon yamamotoi var. kanehirae (Yamam.) Makino

=== Moraceae ===
- Ficus tannoensis Hayata – southern Taiwan
- Ficus vaccinioides Hemsl. & King – southern Taiwan

=== Musaceae ===
- Musa × formobisiana H.L.Chiu, C.T.Shii & T.Y.A.Yang (M. balbisiana × M. itinerans var. formosana)
- Musa insularimontana Hayata
- Musa itinerans var. chiumei H.L.Chiu, C.T.Shii & T.Y.A.Yang
- Musa itinerans var. formosana (Warb.) Häkkinen & C.L.Yeh
- Musa itinerans var. kavalanensis H.L.Chiu, C.T.Shii & T.Y.A.Yang
- Musa yamiensis C.L.Yeh & J.H.Chen

=== Myrtaceae ===
- Syzygium densinervium var. insulare C.E.Chang – Hengchun Peninsula, Lü Dao, and Lan Yü
- Syzygium euphlebium (Hayata) Mori – Hengchun Peninsula
- Syzygium formosanum (Hayata) K.Mori
- Syzygium kusukusuense (Hayata) Mori – Hengchun Peninsula
- Syzygium taiwanicum H.T.Chang & R.H.Miao – Lan Yu, Pengjia Yu

=== Nyctaginaceae ===
- Boerhavia hualienensis Shih H.Chen & M.J.Wu – eastern Taiwan

=== Oleaceae ===
- Ligustrum morrisonense Kaneh. & Sasaki
- Osmanthus kaoi (T.S.Liu & J.C.Liao) S.Y.Lu
- Osmanthus lanceolatus Hayata

=== Onagraceae ===
- Circaea cireniana S.S.Ying
- Circaea hsuehshanensis S.S.Ying
- Circaea lalashanensis S.S.Ying
- Epilobium hohuanense S.S.Ying
- Epilobium nanhualpinum S.S.Ying
- Epilobium nankotaizanense Yamam.
- Epilobium pengii C.J.Chen, Hoch & P.H.Raven
- Epilobium taiwanianum C.J.Chen, Hoch & P.H.Raven
- Epilobium tulinianum S.S.Ying

=== Orchidaceae ===
- Agrostophyllum formosanum Rolfe – southern Taiwan
- Anoectochilus lalashanensis S.S.Ying
- Anoectochilus semiresupinatus T.C.Hsu & S.W.Chung
- Aphyllorchis montana var. membranacea T.C.Hsu
- Aphyllorchis montana f. pingtungensis T.P.Lin
- Aphyllorchis montana var. rotundatipetala (C.S.Leou, S.K.Yu & C.T.Lee) T.P.Lin
- Appendicula reflexa var. kotoensis (Hayata) T.P.Lin – Lan Yü
- Bulbophyllum albociliatum (Tang S.Liu & H.Y.Su) K.Nakaj.
  - Bulbophyllum albociliatum var. albociliatum – central and southern Taiwan
  - Bulbophyllum albociliatum var. remotifolium (Fukuy.) T.P.Lin – Taiwan (Hualien)
  - Bulbophyllum albociliatum var. shanlinshiense T.P.Lin & Y.N.Chang – Taiwan (Nantou)
  - Bulbophyllum albociliatum var. weiminianum T.P.Lin & Kuo Huang – southern Taiwan
- Bulbophyllum brevipedunculatum T.C.Hsu & S.W.Chung – eastern Taiwan
- Bulbophyllum cryptomeriicola T.P.Lin & S.K.Yu
- Bulbophyllum fimbriperianthium W.M.Lin, Kuo Huang & T.P.Lin – southern Taiwan
- Bulbophyllum flaviflorum (Tang, S.Liu & H.Y.Su) Seidenf. – central and southern Taiwan
- Bulbophyllum insulsoides Seidenf. – central and southern Taiwan
- Bulbophyllum karenkoensis T.P.Lin
  - Bulbophyllum karenkoensis var. calvum (T.P.Lin & W.M.Lin) T.P.Lin
  - Bulbophyllum karenkoensis var. karenkoensis
  - Bulbophyllum karenkoensis var. puniceum (T.P.Lin & Y.N.Chang) T.P.Lin
- Bulbophyllum kuanwuense S.W.Chung & T.C.Hsu – southern Taiwan
- Bulbophyllum linearibractium S.S.Ying
- Bulbophyllum maxi W.M.Lin & T.P.Lin
- Bulbophyllum × omerumbellatum T.P.Lin (B. omerandrum × B. umbellatum)
- Bulbophyllum pingtungense S.S.Ying & S.C.Chen – southern Taiwan (east Henchun Peninsula)
- Bulbophyllum sasakii (Hayata) J.J.Verm.
- Bulbophyllum setaceum T.P.Lin
  - Bulbophyllum setaceum var. confragosum (T.P.Lin & Y.N.Chang) T.P.Lin
  - Bulbophyllum setaceum var. setaceum – central Taiwan
- Bulbophyllum somae Hayata – northern Taiwan
- Bulbophyllum taiwanense (Fukuy.) K.Nakaj. – southern Taiwan
- Bulbophyllum tenuislinguae T.P.Lin & Shu H.Wu
- Bulbophyllum tokioi Fukuy. – northern and central Taiwan
- Calanthe arcuata subsp. caudatilabella (Hayata) T.P.Lin – southern Taiwan
- Calanthe arisanensis Hayata
- Calanthe dolichopoda Fukuy.
- Calanthe formosana Rolfe
- Calanthe × hsinchuensis Y.I Lee (C. arisanensis × C. striata)
- Cheirostylis nantouensis T.P.Lin
- Cheirostylis pusilla var. simplex T.P.Lin
- Cheirostylis tabiyahanensis (Hayata) N.Pearce & P.J.Cribb – southeastern Taiwan (Mt. Ayushan)
- Cheirostylis tortilacinia var. rubrifolia (T.P.Lin & W.M.Lin) T.P.Lin – southern Taiwan
- Cheirostylis tortilacinia var. wutaiensis T.P.Lin
- Chiloschista segawae (Masam.) Masam. & Fukuy. – south-central Taiwan
- Corybas puniceus T.P.Lin & W.M.Lin – Yunlin
- Corybas taiwanensis T.P.Lin & S.Y.Leu – northern Taiwan (Taoyuen)
- Crepidium × cordilabium T.P.Lin (C. matsudae × C. ophrydis)
- Crepidium roohutuense (Fukuy.) T.C.Hsu – southern Taiwan
- Cymbidium formosanum Hayata
- Cypripedium formosanum Hayata – central Taiwan
- Cypripedium segawae Masam. – east-central Taiwan
- Cypripedium taiwanalpinum Y.I Lee
- Cyrtosia taiwanica K.H.Wang & T.P.Lin
- Dendrobium furcatopedicellatum Hayata – central and southern Taiwan
- Dendrobium leptocladum Hayata – central and southern Taiwan
- Dendrobium sanseiense Hayata
- Dendrobium somae Hayata – eastern and southern Taiwan
- Dienia shuicae (S.S.Ying) T.P.Lin
- Epipactis fascicularis T.P.Lin
- Epipactis ohwii Fukuy. – central Taiwan
- Epipogium kentingense T.P.Lin & Shu H.Wu
- Epipogium lalashanense S.S.Ying
- Epipogium meridianum T.P.Lin
- Epipogium taiwanense T.C.Hsu
- Erythrodes aggregata (T.P.Lin & W.M.Lin) T.P.Lin
- Erythrodes chinensis var. triantherae (C.L.Yeh & C.S.Leou) T.P.Lin – Lan Yü
- Eulophia brachycentra Hayata – southern Taiwan
- Eulophia segawae Fukuy. – southeastern Taiwan
- Gastrochilus deltoglossus T.C.Hsu, S.I Hsieh, J.H.Wu & H.C.Hung
- Gastrochilus guanwuensis S.S.Ying
- Gastrochilus × hsuehshanensis T.P.Lin & S.K.Yu – (G. formosanus × G. rantabunensis)
- Gastrochilus linii Ormerod – central Taiwan
- Gastrochilus matsudae Hayata – southern Taiwan
  - Gastrochilus matsudae var. hoi (T.P.Lin) T.C.Hsu
  - Gastrochilus matsudae var. matsudae S. Taiwan (Mt. Tawushan)
- Gastrochilus raraensis Fukuy.
- Gastrochilus shaolinchianus S.S.Ying
- Gastrochilus somae (Hayata) Hayata
- Gastrochilus yehii S.I Hsieh, C.T.Lee & J.H.Wu
- Gastrodia appendiculata C.S.Leou & N.J.Chung – central Taiwan
- Gastrodia confusoides T.C.Hsu, S.W.Chung & C.M.Kuo
- Gastrodia flavilabella S.S.Ying – central Taiwan
- Gastrodia kaohsiungensis T.P.Lin
- Gastrodia leoui T.C.Hsu & C.M.Kuo
- Gastrodia leucochila T.C.Hsu & Z.H.Chen
- Gastrodia nantoensis T.C.Hsu & C.M.Kuo ex T.P.Lin
- Gastrodia rubinea T.P.Lin
- Gastrodia sui C.S.Leou, T.C.Hsu & C.R.Yeh
- Goodyera daibuzanensis Yamam.
- Goodyera maculata T.P.Lin
- Goodyera yamiana Fukuy. – Lu Dao
- Habenaria alishanensis T.P.Lin & D.M.Huang
- Habenaria longiracema Fukuy. – central and southern Taiwan
- Habenaria tsaiana T.P.Lin
- Hemipilia alpestris (Fukuy.) Y.Tang & H.Peng – northern and central Taiwan
- Hemipilia × alpestroides T.C.Hsu (H. alpestris × H. kiraishiensis)
- Hemipilia kiraishiensis (Hayata) Y.Tang & H.Peng
- Hemipilia taiwanensis (Fukuy.) Y.Tang & H.Peng – central and southern Taiwan
- Hemipilia takasago-montana (Masam.) Y.Tang & H.Peng central and eastern Taiwan
- Hemipilia tominagae (Hayata) Y.Tang & H.Peng
- Holcoglossum pumilum (Hayata) L.J.Chen, X.J.Xiao & G.Q.Zhang
- Holcoglossum quasipinifolium (Hayata) Schltr.
- × Holcosia pseudotaiwaniana (T.C.Hsu) Ormerod & Kurzweil (Holcoglossum quasipinifolium × Luisia megasepala)
- × Holcosia taiwaniana (S.S.Ying) Ormerod & Kurzweil (Holcoglossum quasipinifolium × Luisia teres}
- Hylophila nipponica (Fukuy.) T.P.Lin – southern Taiwan, including Lan Yü
- Lecanorchis cerina Fukuy. – Mt. Tatungshan
- Lecanorchis latens T.P.Lin & W.M.Lin
- Lecanorchis multiflora var. bihuensis (T.P.Lin & Shu H.Wu) T.P.Lin
- Lecanorchis multiflora var. subpelorica (T.C.Hsu & S.W.Chung) T.P.Lin
- Lecanorchis ohwii Masam.
- Lecanorchis thalassica var. thalassica – central Taiwan
- Liparis amabilis Fukuy. – northern Taiwan (Mt. Chiaopanshan)
- Liparis derchiensis S.S.Ying – Taichung
- Liparis elongata Fukuy. – northern and eastern Taiwan
- Liparis formosamontana T.C.Hsu
- Liparis henryi Rolfe – Hengchun Peninsula
- Liparis laurisilvatica Fukuy.
- Liparis liangzuensis T.P.Lin & W.M.Lin
- Liparis monoceros T.P.Lin
- Liparis nakaharae Hayata
- Liparis reckoniana T.C.Hsu
- Liparis rubrotincta T.C.Hsu
- Liparis sasakii Hayata – central Taiwan
- Luisia cordata Fukuy. – southern Taiwan
- Luisia lui T.C.Hsu & S.W.Chung
- Luisia megasepala Hayata – central and southern Taiwan
- Neottia atayalica T.C.Hsu
- Neottia breviscapa T.C.Hsu
- Neottia cinsbuensis T.P.Lin & D.M.Huang
- Neottia deltoidea (Fukuy.) Szlach. – northeastern and southern Taiwan
- Neottia fukuyamae T.C.Hsu & S.W.Chung – central Taiwan
- Neottia hohuanshanensis T.P.Lin & Shu H.Wu
- Neottia kuanshanensis H.J.Su – south-central Taiwan
- Neottia meifongensis (H.J.Su & C.Y.Hu) T.C.Hsu & S.W.Chung – central Taiwan
- Neottia microauriculata T.C.Hsu
- Neottia morrisonicola (Hayata) Szlach.
- Neottia nankomontana (Fukuy.) Szlach. – northern and central Taiwan
- Neottia piluchiensis T.P.Lin
- Neottia pseudonipponica (Fukuy.) Szlach. – central Taiwan (T'aichung)
- Neottia shenlengiana T.C.Hsu
- Neottia taizanensis (Fukuy.) Szlach. – northern Taiwan (Mt. Nanhutashan)
- Neottia tatakaensis T.C.Hsu & H.C.Hung
- Nervilia hungii T.C.Hsu
- Nervilia lanyuensis S.S.Ying – Lan Yü
- Nervilia linearilabia T.P.Lin
- Nervilia purpureotincta T.C.Hsu
- Nervilia septemtrionarius T.P.Lin
- Nervilia tahanshanensis T.P.Lin & W.M.Lin – southern Taiwan
- Nervilia taitoensis (Hayata) Schltr. – southern Taiwan (T'aitung)
- Nervilia taiwaniana var. ratis (T.P.Lin & Y.N.Chang) T.P.Lin
- Oberonia formosana Hayata
- Oberonia linguae T.P.Lin & Y.N.Chang
- Oberonia segawae T.C.Hsu & S.W.Chung – central and southern Taiwan
- Odontochilus bisaccatus (Hayata) Hayata ex T.P.Lin
- Odontochilus brevistylis subsp. candidus (T.P.Lin & C.C.Hsu) T.P.Lin
- Odontochilus formosanus T.C.Hsu
- Odontochilus gouanyuanensis (S.S.Ying) S.S.Ying
- Odontochilus humilis S.S.Ying
- Odontochilus integrus (Fukuy.) T.Yukawa – Lan Yü
- Oreorchis bilamellata Fukuy. – central and southern Taiwan
- Oreorchis wumanae T.P.Lin
- Peristylus gracilis subsp. insularis T.C.Hsu – Lan Yü
- Phalaenopsis formosana (Christenson) J.M.H.Shaw – southeastern Taiwan, including islands
- Phreatia morii Hayata
- Phreatia taiwaniana Fukuy.
- Platanthera alboflora S.S.Ying
- Platanthera brevicalcarata subsp. brevicalcarata
- Platanthera devolii (T.P.Lin & T.W.Hu) T.P.Lin & K.Inoue – northern and central Taiwan
- Platanthera formosana (T.P.Lin & K.Inoue) Efimov
- Platanthera hohuanshanensis S.S.Ying
- Platanthera longicalcarata Hayata – north-central and central Taiwan
- Platanthera nantousylvatica T.P.Lin
- Platanthera pachyglossa Hayata – central and south-central Taiwan
- Platanthera peichatieniana S.S.Ying – northern Taiwan (Beicha Shan)
- Platanthera quadricalcarata T.P.Lin
- Platanthera taiwanensis (S.S.Ying) S.C.Chen, S.W.Gale & P.J.Cribb – central and southern Taiwan
- Rhomboda lalashanensis S.S.Ying
- Sarcophyton taiwanianum (Hayata) Garay – southern Taiwan
- Spiranthes nivea T.P.Lin & W.M.Lin
  - Spiranthes nivea var. nivea – southern Taiwan
  - Spiranthes nivea var. papillata T.C.Hsu & Suetsugu – northeastern Taiwan
- Tainia dunnii f. caterva (T.P.Lin & W.M.Lin) T.P.Lin
- Tainia elliptica Fukuy. – northern Taiwan
- Tainia hohuanshanensis S.S.Ying
- Tainia hualienia S.S.Ying – eastern Taiwan
- Tipularia odorata Fukuy. – northern and central Taiwan
- Tuberolabium kotoense Yamam. – southern Taiwan including Lan Yü
- Vanda lamellata var. taiwuensis S.S.Ying
- Zeuxine arisanensis Hayata
- Zeuxine flava var. pingtungensis (T.C.Hsu) T.P.Lin
- Zeuxine kantokeiensis Tatew. & Masam. – central Taiwan
- Zeuxine lalashanensis S.S.Ying
- Zeuxine niijimae Tatew. & Masam. – central Taiwan (Nantou)
- Zeuxine yehii T.C.Hsu

=== Orobanchaceae ===
- Euphrasia nankotaizanensis Yamam.
- Euphrasia tarokoana Ohzoi – Hualian Xian
- Euphrasia transmorrisonensis Hayata
  - Euphrasia transmorrisonensis var. durietziana (Ohwi) T.C.Huang & M.J.Wu
  - Euphrasia transmorrisonensis var. transmorrisonensis
- Pedicularis ikomae Sasaki – northeastern Taiwan
- Pedicularis nanfutashanensis T.Yamaz.
- Pedicularis refracta var. transmorrisonensis (Hayata) Hurus. – north-central Taiwan
- Striga crispata Sheng Z.Yang

=== Oxalidaceae ===
- Oxalis daitunensis S.S.Ying
- Oxalis griffithii subsp. taimonii (Yamam.) S.Aoki & J.Murata
- Oxalis taitastricta S.S.Ying

=== Papaveraceae ===
- Corydalis campulicarpa Hayata

=== Pentaphylacaceae ===
- Adinandra formosana Hayata
  - Adinandra formosana var. formosana
  - Adinandra formosana var. obtusissima (Hayata ex Yamam.) H.Keng – southern Taiwan
- Adinandra lasiostyla Hayata – central and southern Taiwan
- Adinandra taiwanensis S.S.Ying
- Cleyera japonica var. taipinensis Key – northern and central Taiwan
- Cleyera lipingensis var. taipinensis (H.Keng) T.L.Ming – northern and central Taiwan
- Cleyera longicarpa (Yamam.) Masam. – northern Taiwan
- Eurya chichaoyangensis S.S.Ying
- Eurya citrifolia S.S.Ying
- Eurya crenatifolia (Yamam.) Kobuski – northern and eastern Taiwan
- Eurya glaberrima Hayata
- Eurya guanwuensis S.S.Ying
- Eurya leptophylla Hayata – central and eastern Taiwan
- Eurya rengechiensis Yamam. – Taizhong
- Eurya septata Chi C.Wu, Z.F.Hsu & C.H.Tsou
- Eurya shaolinchiensis S.S.Ying
- Eurya taianensis S.S.Ying
- Eurya taitungensis C.E.Chang – Hualian

=== Phyllanthaceae ===
- Flueggea taiwanensis S.S.Ying
- Glochidion lanyuense Gang Yao & S.X.Luo – Lan Yü
- Phyllanthus niinamii Hayata
- Phyllanthus oligospermus subsp. oligospermus

=== Pinaceae ===
- Abies kawakamii (Hayata) Ito – central Taiwan
- Keteleeria davidiana var. formosana (Hayata) Hayata
- Picea morrisonicola Hayata – central Taiwan
- Pinus armandi var. mastersiana (Hayata) Hayata – Ali-shan and Yu-shan
- Pinus morrisonicola Hayata
- Pinus taiwanensis Hayata
  - Pinus taiwanensis var. fragilissima (Businský) Farjon – eastern Taiwan (Kuan Shan)
  - Pinus taiwanensis var. taiwanensis

=== Piperaceae ===
- Peperomia tairukouensis S.S.Ying
- Piper kwashoense Hayata – southern Taiwan
- Piper lanyuense K.N.Kung & Kun C.Chang
- Piper okamotoi M.Hiroe
- Piper taiwanense T.T.Lin & S.Y.Lu

=== Pittosporaceae ===
- Pittosporum daphniphylloides var. daphniphylloides
- Pittosporum tobira var. calvescens Ohwi – northern Taiwan
- Pittosporum viburnifolium Hayata – southern Taiwan

=== Plantaginaceae ===
- Callitriche raveniana Lansdown
- Veronica morrisonicola Hayata
- Veronica oligosperma Hayata
- Veronica shichengensis (S.S.Ying) S.S.Ying
- Veronica taiwanica T.Yamaz. – Ilan Xian
- Veronica wulingensis S.S.Ying
- Veronicastrum formosanum (Masam.) T.Yamaz. – Hualian Xian
- Veronicastrum loshanense Tien T.Chen & F.S.Chou – eastern Taiwan

=== Plumbaginaceae ===
- Limonium wrightii var. luteum (H.Hara) H.Hara

=== Poaceae ===
- Ampelocalamus naibunensis (Hayata) T.H.Wen
- Arundinella taiwanica Veldkamp
- Arundo formosana var. gracilis Hack. – northern and western Taiwan
- Bambusa odashimae Hatus. ex Ohrnb.
- Bambusa utilis W.C.Lin
- Brachypodium kawakamii Hayata
- Digitaria fauriei Ohwi
- Elymus formosanus (Honda) Á.Löve
- Eragrostis fauriei Ohwi
- Festuca hondae E.B.Alexeev
- Helictotrichon abietetorum (Ohwi) Ohwi
- Lolium formosanum (Honda) Banfi – northeastern Taiwan
- Microstegium fauriei (Hayata) Honda
- Mnesithea laevis var. chenii (C.C.Hsu) de Koning & Sosef
- Panicum taiwanense S.S.Ying
- Poa nankoensis Ohwi
- Poa takasagomontana Ohwi
- Poa tenuicula Ohwi
- Spodiopogon formosanus Rendle

=== Podocarpaceae ===
- Podocarpus nakaii Hayata

=== Polygalaceae ===
- Polygala arcuata Hayata – central and southern Taiwan
- Polygala sandiaochiaoensis S.S.Ying
- Polygala taiwanensis S.S.Ying

=== Polygonaceae ===
- Koenigia yatagaiana (T.Mori) T.C.Hsu & S.W.Chung
- Persicaria pilushanensis (Y.C.Liu & C.H.Ou) C.F.Kuo ex T.C.Hsu & S.W.Chung
- Polygonum hohuanshanense S.S.Ying
- Polygonum ilanense Y.C.Liu & C.H.Ou
- Polygonum loshanense S.S.Ying
- Polygonum taiwanense S.S.Ying

=== Polypodiaceae ===
- Arachniodes pseudoaristata (Tagawa) Ohwi
- Bolbitis lianhuachihensis Y.S.Chao, Y.F.Huang & H.Y.Liu
- Bolbitis × nanjenensis C.M.Kuo (B. appendiculata × B. heteroclita)
- Cyrtomium simadae (Tagawa) Y.H.Chang
- Cyrtomium taiwanianum Tagawa
- Davallia chrysanthemifolia Hayata
- Dryopteris × holttumii Li Bing Zhang (D. apiciflora × D. maximowicziana)
- Dryopteris kwanzanensis Tagawa
- Dryopteris pseudolunanensis Tagawa
- Dryopteris pseudosieboldii Hayata
- Dryopteris subatrata Tagawa
- Dryopteris subexaltata (Christ) C.Chr.
- Dryopteris tenuipes (Rosenst.) Seriz.
- Goniophlebium raishaense (Rosenst.) L.Y.Kuo
- Grammitis moorei (Parris & Ralf Knapp) Christenh.
- Grammitis nuda Tagawa
- Grammitis taiwanensis (Parris & Ralf Knapp) Christenh.
- Lepisorus kawakamii (Hayata) Tagawa
- Lepisorus megasorus Ching
- Lepisorus monilisorus (Hayata) Tagawa
- Lepisorus pseudoussuriensis Tagawa
- Loxogramme biformis Tagawa
- Loxogramme remote-frondigera Hayata
- Polystichum × gemmilachenense Miyam. & T.Nakam.
- Polystichum integripinnum Hayata
- Polystichum parvipinnulum Tagawa
- Polystichum pseudodeltodon Tagawa
- Polystichum × pseudoparvipinnulum Miyam. & T.Nakam.
- Polystichum pseudostenophyllum Tagawa
- Polystichum × silviamontanum Miyam. & T.Nakam.
- Polystichum subapiciflorum Hayata
- Polystichum subobliquum Tagawa
- Polystichum taizhongense H.S.Kung
- Selliguea echinospora (Tagawa) Fraser-Jenk.
- Selliguea falcatopinnata (Hayata) H.Ohashi & K.Ohashi – southern Taiwan and Lan Yü
- Selliguea taiwanensis (Tagawa) H.Ohashi & K.Ohashi
- Tectaria subfuscipes (Tagawa) C.M.Kuo

=== Primulaceae ===
- Ardisia cornudentata Mez
  - Ardisia cornudentata subsp. cornudentata
  - Ardisia cornudentata subsp. morrisonensis (Hayata) Yuen P.Yang
  - Ardisia cornudentata var. stenosepala (Hayata) Yuen P.Yang
- Ardisia violacea (T.Suzuki) W.Z.Fang & K.Yao
- Lysimachia chingshuiensis C.I Peng & C.M.Hu – Ch'ing-shui Shan
- Lysimachia taiwaniana T.Suzuki ex M.T.Kao
- Maesa hengchunensis S.S.Ying
- Maesa hotungensis S.S.Ying
- Maesa lanyuensis Yuen P.Yang
- Maesa perlaria var. formosana (Mez) Yuen P.Yang
- Maesa tairukouensis S.S.Ying
- Primula miyabeana T.Itô & Kawak.

=== Proteaceae ===
- Helicia rengetiensis Masam.
- Helicia yingtzulinia S.S.Ying

=== Pteridaceae ===
- Adiantum formosanum Tagawa
- Adiantum meishanianum F.S.Hsu ex Yea C.Liu & W.L.Chiou
- Adiantum menglianense Y.Y.Qian – south-central Taiwan
- Adiantum taiwanianum Tagawa
- Antrophyum castaneum H.Itô
- Haplopteris heterophylla C.W.Chen, Y.H.Chang & Yea C.Liu
- Pteris angustipinna Tagawa
- Pteris austrotaiwanensis Y.S.Chao – southern Taiwan
- Pteris incurvata Y.S.Chao, H.Y.Liu & W.L.Chiou
- Pteris longipinna Hayata
- Pteris rugosifolia Y.S.Chao

=== Ranunculaceae ===
- Aconitum formosanum Tamura – northern Taiwan
- Aconitum fukutomei Hayata
- Actaea taiwanensis J.Compton, Hedd. & T.Y.Yang
- Aquilegia kozakii Masam. – northeastern Taiwan (Mt. Taipingshan)
- Calathodes polycarpa Ohwi
- Clematis akoensis Hayata – southern Taiwan
- Clematis chinensis var. tatushanensis T.Y.A.Yang
- Clematis formosana Kuntze – eastern and southern Taiwan
- Clematis lishanensis (T.Y.A.Yang & T.C.Huang) Luferov – central Taiwan
- Clematis morii Hayata – central Taiwan
- Clematis parviloba var. bartlettii (Yamam.) W.T.Wang – central Taiwan
- Clematis psilandra Kitag. – central Taiwan
- Clematis tamurae T.Y.A.Yang & T.C.Huang
- Clematis terniflora var. garanbiensis (Hayata) M.C.Chang – southern Taiwan
- Clematis tsugetorum Ohwi – northern Taiwan
- Dichocarpum arisanense (Hayata) W.T.Wang & P.K.Hsiao
- Dichocarpum uniflorum S.S.Ying
- Ranunculus cheirophyllus Hayata
- Ranunculus formosa-montanus Ohwi – Nanhu Dashan
- Ranunculus junipericola Ohwi
- Ranunculus matsudae Hayata ex Masam.
- Ranunculus morii (Yamam.) Ohwi – northern Taiwan
- Ranunculus nankotaizanus Ohwi – Nanhu Dashan
- Ranunculus taisanensis Hayata
- Ranunculus taiwanensis Y.C.Liu & F.Y.Lu
- Thalictrum lecoyeri var. debilistylum W.T.Wang
- Thalictrum myriophyllum Ohwi – northern Taiwan
- Thalictrum oshimae Masam.
- Thalictrum rubescens Ohwi – northern Taiwan
- Thalictrum sessile Hayata
- Thalictrum urbaini Hayata
  - Thalictrum urbaini var. majus T.Shimizu
  - Thalictrum urbaini var. urbaini
- Trollius taihasenzanensis Masam.

=== Rhamnaceae ===
- Berchemia arisanensis Y.C.Liu & F.Y.Lu
- Berchemia fenchifuensis C.M.Wang & S.Y.Lu
- Berchemia paniculata S.S.Ying
- Rhamnus formosana Matsum.
- Rhamnus nakaharae (Hayata) Hayata
- Rhamnus pilushanensis Y.C.Liu & C.M.Wang
- Rhamnus salixiophylla S.S.Ying
- Rhamnus utilis var. chingshuiensis (T.Shimizu) T.Yamaz.
- Sageretia randaiensis Hayata – northern and central Taiwan
- Ventilago elegans Hemsl.

=== Rosaceae ===
- Argentina tugitakensis (Masam.) Soják
- Cotoneaster chingshuiensis Kun C.Chang & Chih C.Wang
- Cotoneaster hualiensis J.Fryer & B.Hylmö
- Cotoneaster konishii Hayata
- Cotoneaster morrisonensis Hayata
- Cotoneaster nantouensis J.Fryer & B.Hylmö
- Cotoneaster rosiflorus Kun C.Chang & F.Y.Lu
- Cotoneaster siyuanensis S.S.Ying
- Cotoneaster taiwanensis J.Fryer & B.Hylmö
- Cotoneaster tetrapetalus S.S.Ying
- Filipendula kiraishiensis Hayata
- Fragaria hayatae Makino
- Fragaria tayulinensis S.S.Ying
- Macromeles formosana Koidz.
- Photinia chingshuiensis (T.Shimizu) T.S.Liu & H.J.Su
- Photinia serratifolia var. ardisiifolia (Hayata) H.Ohashi – eastern Taiwan
- Photinia serratifolia var. daphniphylloides (Hayata) L.T.Lu – eastern Taiwan
- Photinia serratifolia var. lasiopetala (Hayata) H.Ohash – central Taiwan
- Potentilla morrisonensis Hayata
- Pourthiaea lucida Decne.
- Prinsepia scandens Hayata
- Prunus chiliangensis S.S.Ying
- Prunus guanwuensis S.S.Ying
- Prunus tayulinensis S.S.Ying
- Prunus transarisanensis Hayata
- Pyracantha koidzumii (Hayata) Rehder
- Pyrus alpinotaiwaniana S.S.Ying
- Rhaphiolepis indica f. impressivena (Masam.) S.S.Ying
- Rhaphiolepis indica var. shilanensis Yuen P.Yang & H.Y.Liu
- Rhaphiolepis indica var. tashiroi Hayata – northern and southern Taiwan
- Rosa hohuanlinparvifolia S.S.Ying
- Rosa morrisonensis Hayata – Yushan
- Rosa pricei Hayata
- Rosa shaolinchiensis S.S.Ying
- Rosa taiwanensis Nakai
- Rosa yilanalpina S.S.Ying
- Rubus arachnoideus Y.C.Liu & F.Y.Lu – eastern Taiwan
- Rubus cuifengensis S.S.Ying
- Rubus glandulosocalycinus Hayata – central and northern Taiwan
- Rubus hohuanshanensis S.S.Ying
- Rubus kawakamii Hayata
- Rubus lanyuensis Hung T.Chang
- Rubus liui Yuen P.Yang & S.Y.Lu – northeastern Taiwan
- Rubus parviaraliifolius Hayata
- Rubus parvifolius var. toapiensis (Yamam.) Hosok. – eastern Taiwan
- Rubus siyuanensis S.S.Ying
- Rubus taitoensis Hayata
  - Rubus taitoensis var. aculeatiflorus (Hayata) H.Ohashi & C.F.Hsieh
  - Rubus taitoensis var. taitoensis
- Rubus taiwanicola Koidz. & Ohwi – central Taiwan
- Rubus tayulinensis S.S.Ying
- Rubus yuenfengensis S.S.Ying
- Rubus yuliensis Y.C.Liu & F.Y.Lu – eastern Taiwan
- Sorbus randaiensis (Hayata) Koidz.
- Spiraea japonica var. formosana (Hayata) Masam.
- Spiraea morrisonicola Hayata
  - Spiraea morrisonicola var. hayatana (H.L.Li) Businský
  - Spiraea morrisonicola var. morrisonicola
- Spiraea prunifolia var. pseudoprunifolia (Hayata ex Nakai) H.L.Li
- Spiraea tarokoensis Hayata – eastern Taiwan
- Spiraea tatakaensis I.S.Chen – central Taiwan

=== Rubiaceae ===
- Conjugatovarium S.S.Ying
  - Conjugatovarium lalashanianum S.S.Ying
- Damnacanthus angustifolius Hayata
- Galium alboflorum S.S.Ying
- Galium echinocarpum Hayata – central Taiwan
- Galium formosense Ohwi – Gaoxiong
- Galium guanwuense S.S.Ying
- Galium hohuanshanense S.S.Ying
- Galium lishanense S.S.Ying
- Galium minutissimum T.Shimizu – Hualian
- Galium morii Hayata – Jiayi
- Galium nanhumontanum S.S.Ying
- Galium nankotaizanum Ohwi – mountains of Taiwan
- Galium shengkuangense S.S.Ying
- Galium siyuanianum S.S.Ying
- Galium taiwanense Masam. – northern Taiwan mountains
- Galium takasagomontanum Masam.
- Galium tarokoense Hayata
- Lasianthus simizui (Tang S.Liu & J.M.Chao) H.Zhu
- Leptopetalum taiwanense (S.F.Huang & J.Murata) Shih H.Chen & M.J.Wu – Taiwan including Lü Tao
- Mussaenda acalycophylla S.S.Ying
- Mussaenda darenensis S.S.Ying
- Mussaenda horenensis S.S.Ying
- Neanotis formosana (Hayata) W.H.Lewis
- Oldenlandia butensis (Masam.) Govaerts – Yilan
- Ophiorrhiza hayatana Ohwi
- Rubia linii J.M.Chao
- Scleromitrion sirayanum T.C.Hsu & Z.H.Chen
- Shaolinchiana S.S.Ying
  - Shaolinchiana lalashaniana S.S.Ying
  - Shaolinchiana taiwaniana S.S.Ying
  - Shaolinchiana tungyanshaniana S.S.Ying
- Tangshuia S.S.Ying
  - Tangshuia pitouchaoensis S.S.Ying
- Theligonum formosanum (Ohwi) Ohwi & T.S.Liu – western Taiwan (Pingtung: Tawushan)
- Wendlandia erythroxylon Cowan

=== Rutaceae ===
- Glycosmis erythrocarpa (Hayata) Hayata
- Skimmia japonica subsp. distincte-venulosa (Hayata) T.C.Ho
- Skimmia japonica var. orthoclada (Hayata) Masam.
- Zanthoxylum wutaiense I.S.Chen – Pingdong

=== Sabiaceae ===
- Sabia transarisanensis Hayata

=== Salicaceae ===
- Salix doii Hayata
- Salix fulvopubescens Hayata
- Salix kunyangensis S.S.Ying
- Salix kusanoi (Hayata) C.K.Schneid
- Salix morrisonicola Kimura
  - Salix morrisonicola var. morrisonicola
  - Salix morrisonicola var. takasagoalpina (Koidz.) F.Y.Lu, C.H.Ou, Y.T.Chen, Y.S.Chi, K.C.Lu & Y.H.Tseng
- Salix okamotoana Koidz.
- Salix pilushanensis S.S.Ying
- Salix tagawana Koidz.
- Salix taiwanalpina Kimura

=== Santalaceae ===
- Viscum taiwanianum S.S.Ying

=== Sapindaceae ===
- Acer albopurpurascens Hayata
- Acer buergerianum var. formosanum (Hayata ex Koidz.) Sasaki – northern and central Taiwan
- Acer caudatifolium Hayata
- Acer morrisonense Hayata
- Acer serrulatum Hayata – northern and central Taiwan
- Acer tutcheri subsp. formosanum A.E.Murray
- Koelreuteria elegans subsp. formosana (Hayata) F.G.Mey.

=== Saxifragaceae ===
- Asimitellaria formosana (Hayata) R.A.Folk & Y.Okuyama
- Astilbe longicarpa (Hayata) Hayata
- Astilbe macroflora Hayata – central Taiwan
- Chrysosplenium hebetatum Ohwi
- Chrysosplenium lanuginosum var. formosanum (Hayata) H.Hara
- Chrysosplenium taiwanianum S.S.Ying

=== Schisandraceae ===
- Illicium arborescens Hayata
- Illicium × rubellum S.Y.Lu ex W.J.Huang & S.W.Chung
- Schisandra arisanensis subsp. arisanensis

=== Scrophulariaceae ===
- Scrophularia formosana H.L.Li – Taidong Xian
- Scrophularia yoshimurae T.Yamaz.

=== Selaginellaceae ===
- Selaginella devolii H.M.Chang, P.F.Lu & W.L.Chiou
- Selaginella helvetica subsp. pseudonipponica (Tagawa) H.M.Chang, W.L.Chiou & J.C.Wang

=== Simaroubaceae ===
- Ailanthus altissima var. tanakae (Hayata) Kaneh. & Sasaki – northern Taiwan

=== Smilacaceae ===
- Smilax horridiramula Hayata – central and eastern Taiwan
- Smilax insularis T.C.Hsu & S.W.Chung – southern Taiwan
- Smilax luei T.Koyama – central Taiwan
- Smilax nantoensis T.Koyama – central Taiwan
- Smilax taipeiensis T.C.Hsu & S.W.Chung – northern Taiwan
- Smilax taiwanensis S.S.Ying
- Smilax tungyuanensis S.S.Ying

=== Solanaceae ===
- Solanum chingchunense S.S.Ying
- Solanum peikuoense S.S.Ying

=== Staphyleaceae ===
- Staphylea formosana (Nakai) Byng & Christenh.

=== Styracaceae ===
- Alniphyllum pterospermum Matsum.
- Styrax suberifolius var. hayataianus (Perkins) K.Mori

=== Symplocaceae ===
- Symplocos juiyenensis C.C.Wang & C.H.Ou – central Taiwan
- Symplocos koidzumiana Tatew. & B.Yoshim.
- Symplocos migoi Nagam.
- Symplocos nokoensis (Hayata) Kaneh.
- Symplocos shilanensis Y.C.Liu & F.Y.Lu
- Symplocos sonoharae var. formosana C.C.Wang
- Symplocos sumuntia var. modesta (Brand) Noot.
- Symplocos taiwanensis S.S.Ying

=== Taxaceae ===
- Amentotaxus formosana H.L.Li – southeastern Taiwan

=== Theaceae ===
- Camellia chinmeiae S.L.Lee & T.Y.A.Yang
- Camellia guanwuensis S.S.Ying
- Camellia hsinpeiensis S.S.Ying
- Camellia tungyanshanensis S.S.Ying

=== Thymelaeaceae ===
- Daphne arisanensis Hayata
- Daphne chingshuishaniana S.S.Ying – Ch'ing-shui Shan
- Daphne morrisonensis C.E.Chang – Mt. Yushan
- Daphne nana Tagawa – eastern Taiwan
- Daphne yangtoushanensis S.S.Ying
- Wikstroemia mononectaria Hayata
- Wikstroemia taiwanensis C.E.Chang

=== Ulmaceae ===
- Ulmus uyematsui Hayata – central Taiwan

=== Urticaceae ===
- Chamabainia guanwuensis S.S.Ying
- Chamabainia meifenggensis (S.S.Ying) S.S.Ying
- Dendrocnide kotoensis (Hayata ex Yamam.) B.L.Shih & Yuen P.Yang – Taidong
- Elatostema acuteserratum B.L.Shih & Yuen P.Yang – southeastern Taiwan including Lan Yü
- Elatostema amoenum S.S.Ying
- Elatostema caudifolium S.S.Ying
- Elatostema elongatopeduncellatum S.S.Ying
- Elatostema guanwuense S.S.Ying
- Elatostema hirtellipedunculata B.L.Shih & Yuen P.Yang
- Elatostema × hybrida Yu H.Tseng & J.M.Hu (E. lineolatum × E. platyphyllum)
- Elatostema hypoglaucum B.L.Shih & Yuen P.Yang
- Elatostema lalashanense S.S.Ying
- Elatostema liutangshuii S.S.Ying
- Elatostema nanhumontanum S.S.Ying
- Elatostema pauciflorum S.S.Ying
- Elatostema rivulare B.L.Shih & Yuen P.Yang
- Elatostema siyuanwukouense S.S.Ying
- Elatostema strigillosum B.L.Shih & Yuen P.Yang – Taidong
- Elatostema subcoriaceum B.L.Shih & Yuen P.Yang – Lan Yü
- Elatostema taiwanense S.S.Ying
- Elatostema taoyuanense S.S.Ying
- Elatostema tungyanshanense S.S.Ying
- Elatostema villosum B.L.Shih & Yuen P.Yang – southern Taiwan
- Laportea taiwanensis S.S.Ying
- Parietaria taiwaniana S.S.Ying
- Pilea funkikensis Hayata
- Pilea loshanensis S.S.Ying
- Pilea matsudae Yamam.
- Pilea rotundinucula Hayata
- Pilea somae Hayata – southern Taiwan
- Pilea taiwanensis S.S.Ying
- Pilea yingshaoyaoana S.S.Ying
- Pouzolzia sanguinea var. formosana (H.L.Li) Friis & Wilmot-Dear
- Pouzolzia taiwaniana C.I Peng & S.W.Chung
- Urtica taiwaniana S.S.Ying – central Taiwan
- Urtica thunbergiana subsp. perserrata

=== Viburnaceae ===
- Viburnum formosanum subsp. formosanum
- Viburnum hayatae I.M.Turner
- Viburnum odoratissimum var. arboricola (Hayata) Yamam.
- Viburnum parvifolium Hayata
- Viburnum pilushanicum S.S.Ying
- Viburnum plicatum var. formosanum Y.C.Liu & C.H.Ou – northern Taiwan
- Viburnum taiwanianum Hayata – central and southern Taiwan

=== Violaceae ===
- Viola adenothrix Hayata
  - Viola adenothrix var. adenothrix
  - Viola adenothrix var. tsugitakaensis (Masam.) J.C.Wang & T.C.Huang
- Viola betonicifolia var. yuanfengia S.S.Ying
- Viola formosana Hayata
  - Viola formosana var. formosana
  - Viola formosana var. kawakamii (Hayata) Y.S.Chen & Q.E.Yang
- Viola lungtungensis S.S.Ying
- Viola nagasawae Makino & Hayata
  - Viola nagasawae var. nagasawae
  - Viola nagasawae var. pricei (W.Becker) J.C.Wang & T.C.Huang
- Viola obtusa var. tsuifengensis T.Hashim. – Nantou
- Viola pilushanensis S.S.Ying
- Viola pitouchaoensis S.S.Ying
- Viola pubipetala S.S.Ying
- Viola sandaiojiaoensis S.S.Ying
- Viola senzanensis Hayata
- Viola shaoyoukengensis S.S.Ying
- Viola shinchikuensis Yamam.
- Viola wulinfarmensis S.S.Ying
- Viola xibaoensis S.S.Ying

=== Vitaceae ===
- Cissus pingtungensis S.S.Ying
- Pseudocayratia pengiana T.W.Hsu & J.Wen
- Tetrastigma lanyuense C.E.Chang

=== Xyridaceae ===
- Xyris formosana Hayata

=== Zingiberaceae ===
- Alpinia × ilanensis S.C.Liu & J.C.Wang (A. japonica × A. pricei) – northeastern Taiwan
- Alpinia kawakamii Hayata – southern Taiwan
- Alpinia koshunensis Hayata – southern Taiwan
- Alpinia kusshakuensis Hayata (perhaps A. shimadae × A. uraiensis) – northern Taiwan
- Alpinia lalashanensis S.S.Ying
- Alpinia mesanthera Hayata
- Alpinia nantoensis F.Y.Lu & Y.W.Kuo
- Alpinia oui Y.H.Tseng & Chih C.Wang
- Alpinia pricei Hayata – eastern Taiwan
- Alpinia sessiliflora Kitam. – central Taiwan
- Alpinia shimadae Hayata
- Alpinia shoukaensis S.S.Ying
- Alpinia tonrokuensis Hayata – northern Taiwan
- Alpinia uraiensis Hayata – northern Taiwan
- Zingiber chengii Y.H.Tseng, C.M.Wang & Y.C.Lin
- Zingiber kawagoei Hayata
- Zingiber pleiostachyum K.Schum. – southern Taiwan
- Zingiber shuanglongense C.L.Yeh & S.W.Chung

=== Cultivated crops endemic to Taiwan ===
- Spodiopogon formosanus Rendle
- Symplocos trichoclada

== See also ==
- List of protected species in Taiwan
- Category:Endemic flora of Taiwan
- Category:Endemic fauna of Taiwan
