= Carabus masuzoi =

Scientific classification
- Kingdom: Animalia
- Phylum: Arthropoda
- Class: Insecta
- Order: Coleoptera
- Suborder: Adephaga
- Family: Carabidae
- Genus: Carabus
- Species: C. masuzoi

Binomial name
- Carabus masuzoi (Imura & Sato, 1989)

Synonyms
- Apotomopterus (Taiwanocarabus) masuzoi Imura & Sato, 1989

Species of beetle

Carabus masuzoi is a species of ground beetle, family of Carabidae. It is endemic to Taiwan, and was first found in mid-altitude mountains of central Taiwan. Its body is black colored with longitudinal indents on its elytra, and is capable of flight. Its morphology differs between different habitat types.
