= Conjugatovarium =

Scientific classification
- Kingdom: Plantae
- Clade: Tracheophytes
- Clade: Angiosperms
- Clade: Eudicots
- Clade: Asterids
- Order: Gentianales
- Family: Rubiaceae
- Genus: Conjugatovarium; S.S.Ying (2023)
- Species: C. lalashanianum

Binomial name
- Conjugatovarium lalashanianum S.S.Ying (2023)

Genus of flowering plants

Conjugatovarium lalashanianum is a species of flowering plant in the family Rubiaceae. It is the sole species in genus Conjugatovarium. It is endemic to Taiwan.
