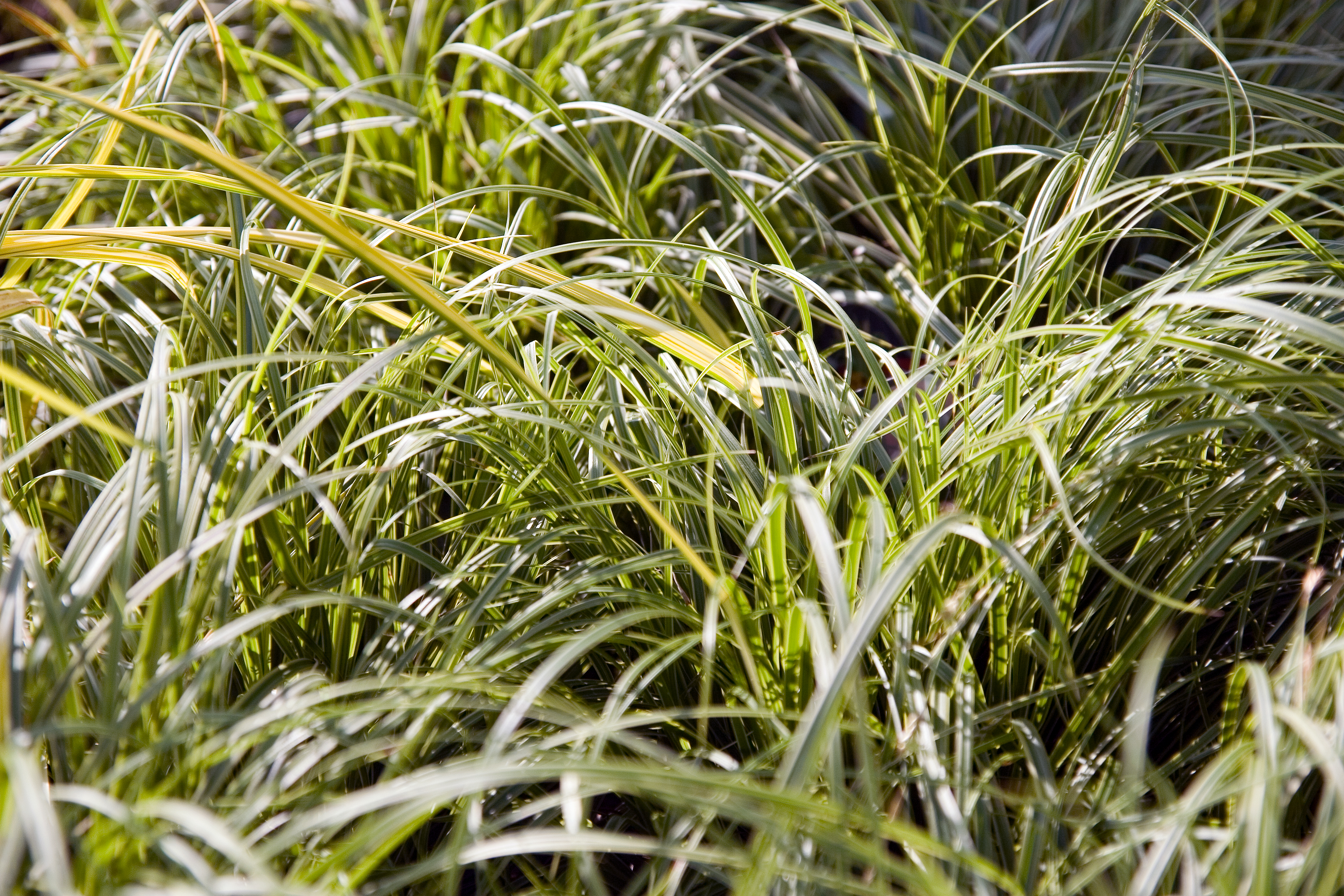
- 'Kaga-nishiki' cultivar

Scientific classification
- Kingdom: Plantae
- Clade: Tracheophytes
- Clade: Angiosperms
- Clade: Monocots
- Clade: Commelinids
- Order: Poales
- Family: Cyperaceae
- Genus: Carex
- Species: C. dolichostachya

Binomial name
- Carex dolichostachya Hayata

Synonyms
- List: Carex qimenensis S.W.Su & S.M.Xu; Carex rankanensis Hayata; Carex trichosperma Ohwi; Diplocarex matsudae Hayata

= Carex dolichostachya =

Species of grass-like plant

Carex dolichostachya is a species of flowering plant in the sedge genus Carex, family Cyperaceae. It is native to eastern Asia; central and southeast China, Taiwan, the Philippines, Korea, the Ryukyu Islands, and Japan. Its popular cultivar 'Kaga-nishiki' is sold in the US by the trade designation Gold Fountains.

== Subtaxa ==
The following subtaxa are accepted:

- Carex dolichostachya subsp. dolichostachya
- Carex dolichostachya f. imbecillis (Ohwi) T.Koyama – Kyushu, Japan
- Carex dolichostachya subsp. trichosperma (Ohwi) T.Koyama – Alishan Range, Taiwan
