= Carex ayako-maedae =

Scientific classification
- Kingdom: Plantae
- Clade: Tracheophytes
- Clade: Angiosperms
- Clade: Monocots
- Clade: Commelinids
- Order: Poales
- Family: Cyperaceae
- Genus: Carex
- Species: C. ayako-maedae

Binomial name
- Carex ayako-maedae T.Koyama

Species of grass-like plant

Carex ayako-maedae is a sedge of the Cyperaceae family that is native to Taiwan.

== See also ==
- List of Carex species
