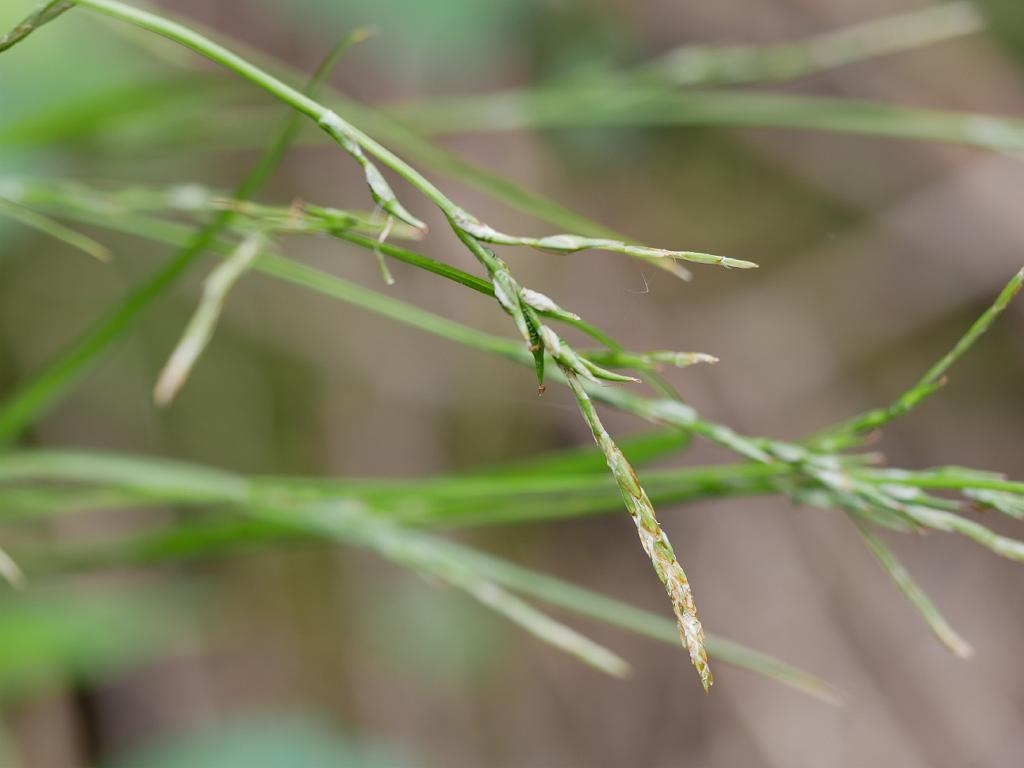

Scientific classification
- Kingdom: Plantae
- Clade: Tracheophytes
- Clade: Angiosperms
- Clade: Monocots
- Clade: Commelinids
- Order: Poales
- Family: Cyperaceae
- Genus: Carex
- Species: C. dissitiflora

Binomial name
- Carex dissitiflora Franch.

= Carex dissitiflora =

Species of plant

Carex dissitiflora is a tussock-forming species of perennial sedge in the family Cyperaceae. It is native to parts of Japan and Taiwan.

The plant was first formally described by the botanist Adrien René Franchet in 1895 as a part of the work Bulletin de la Societe Philomatique de Paris. There are two subspecies;

- Carex dissitiflora subsp. dissitiflora
- Carex dissitiflora subsp. taiwanensis (Ohwi) T.Koyama

== See also ==
- List of Carex species
