= Tangshuia =

Scientific classification
- Kingdom: Plantae
- Clade: Tracheophytes
- Clade: Angiosperms
- Clade: Eudicots
- Clade: Asterids
- Order: Gentianales
- Family: Rubiaceae
- Genus: Tangshuia; S.S.Ying (2022)
- Species: T. pitouchaoensis

Binomial name
- Tangshuia pitouchaoensis S.S.Ying (2022)

Genus of plants

Tangshuia is a genus of flowering plants belonging to the family Rubiaceae. It contains a single species, Tangshuia pitouchaoensis. It is an annual native to Taiwan.
