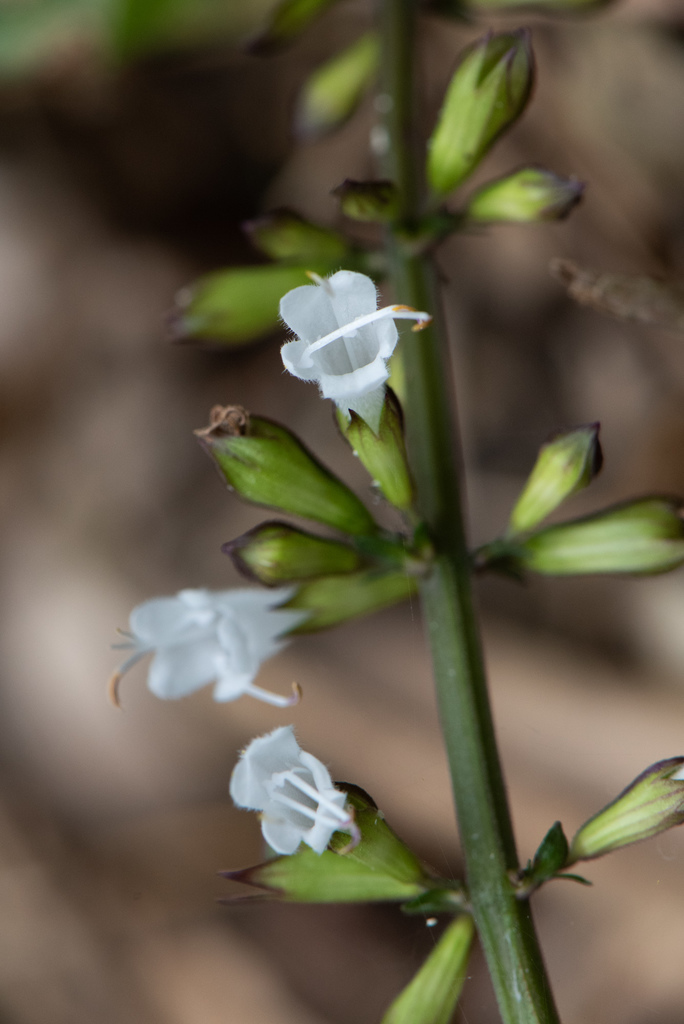

Scientific classification
- Kingdom: Plantae
- Clade: Embryophytes
- Clade: Tracheophytes
- Clade: Spermatophytes
- Clade: Angiosperms
- Clade: Eudicots
- Clade: Asterids
- Order: Lamiales
- Family: Lamiaceae
- Genus: Salvia
- Species: S. hayatae

Binomial name
- Salvia hayatae Makino ex Hayata

Varieties
- S. hayatae var. hayatae; S. hayatae var. pinnata Hayata

= Salvia hayatae =

Species of herb

Salvia hayatae is an annual herb that is native to the foothills of Taiwan. The stems of S. hayatae reach 20 to 45 cm (7.9 to 17.7 in) tall, with mostly basal leaves. Inflorescences are 2–5 flowered verticillasters, widely spaced at the bottom and crowded at the top, in terminal racemes or panicles.

There are two named varieties: S. hayatae var. hayatae has leaves that are 2-pinnately compound, while S. hayatae var. pinnata has leaves that are 1-pinnately compound.
