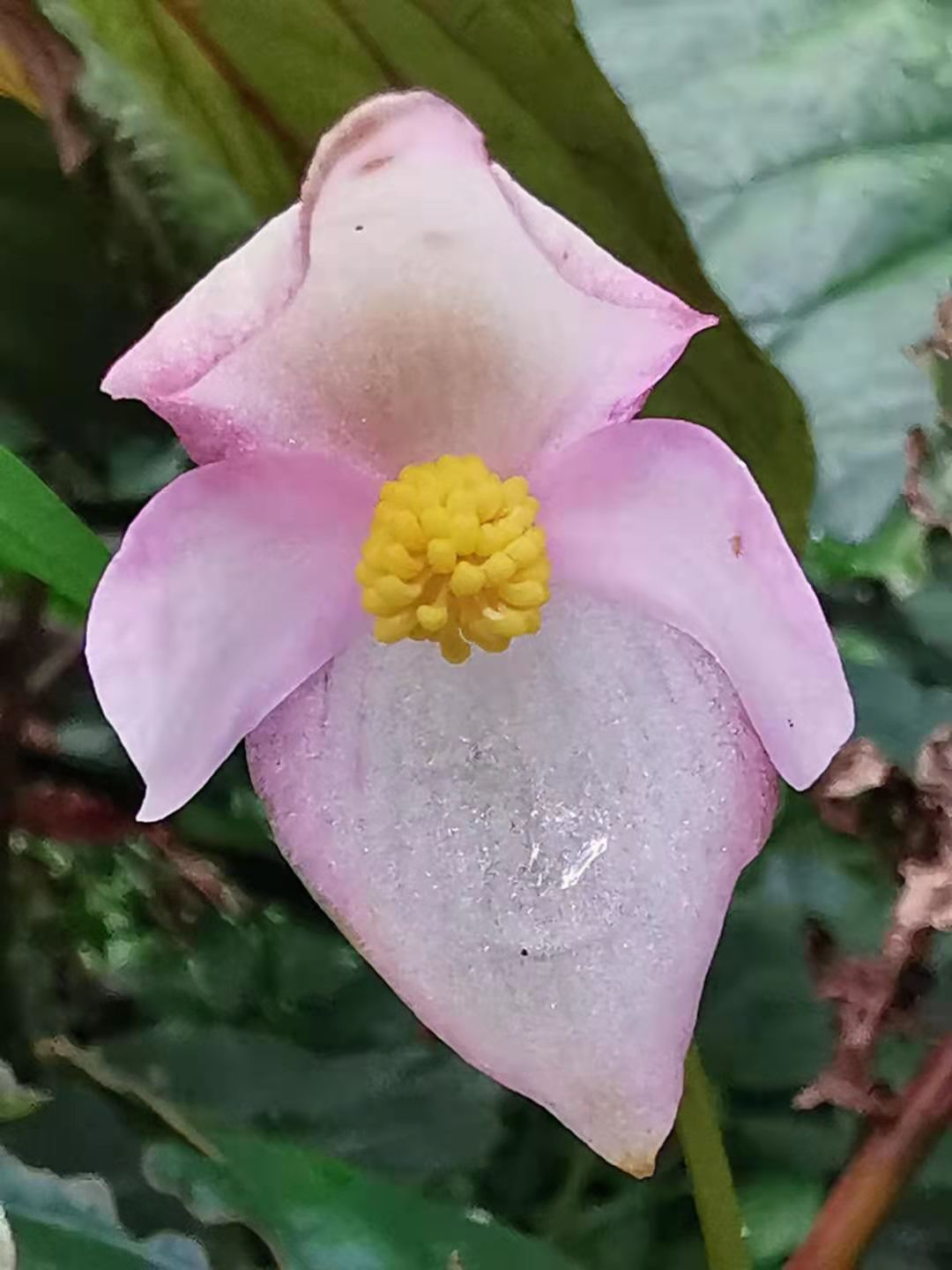
- Close-up of flower
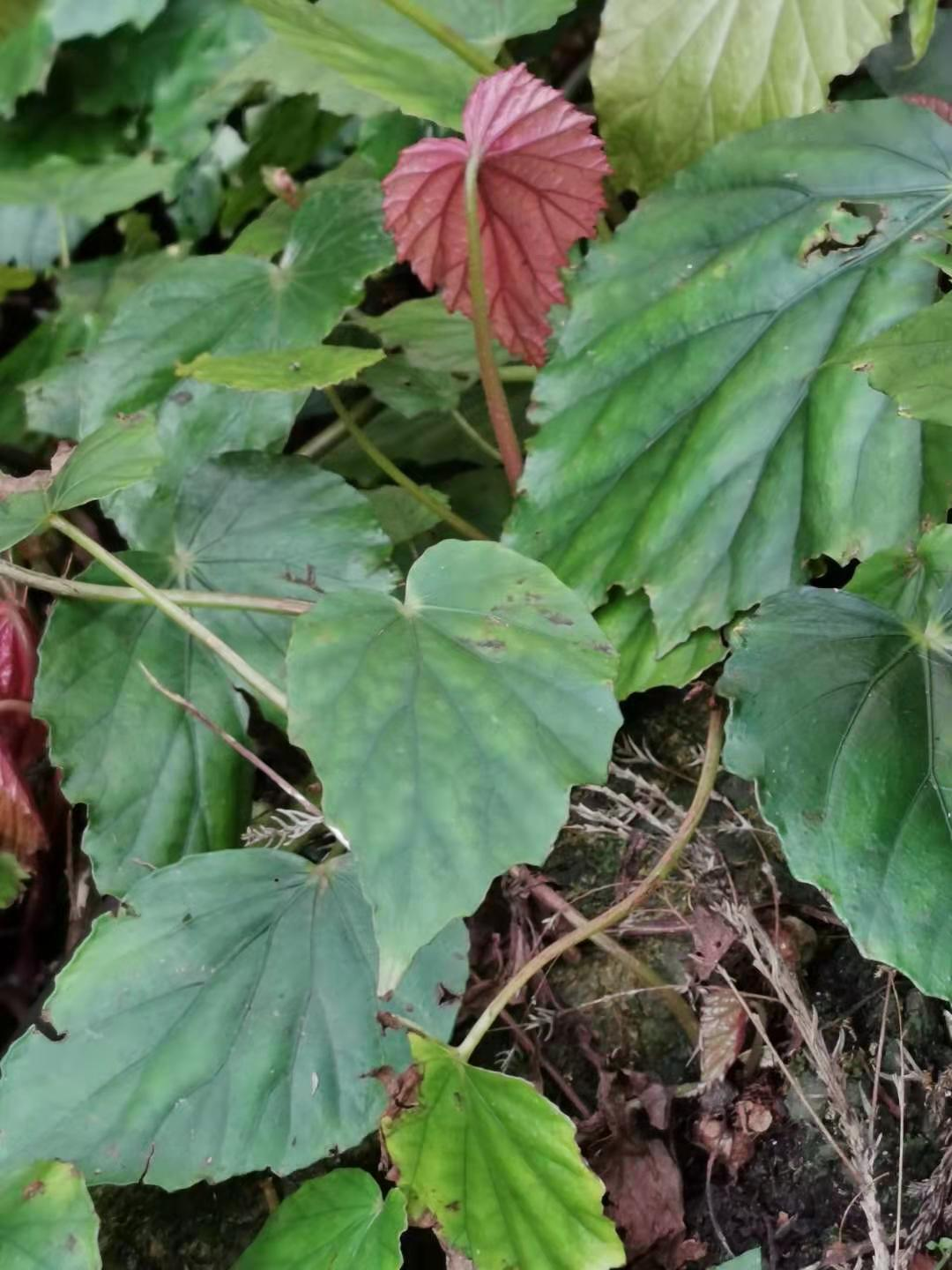
- Foliage

Scientific classification
- Kingdom: Plantae
- Clade: Tracheophytes
- Clade: Angiosperms
- Clade: Eudicots
- Clade: Rosids
- Order: Cucurbitales
- Family: Begoniaceae
- Genus: Begonia
- Species: B. chitoensis

Binomial name
- Begonia chitoensis Tang S.Liu & M.J.Lai

Synonyms
- Begonia formosana var. chitoensis (Tang S.Liu & M.J.Lai) S.S.Ying

= Begonia chitoensis =

Species of plant

Begonia chitoensis, the hardy Taiwan begonia, is a species of flowering plant in the family Begoniaceae, native to central and northern Taiwan. It is found growing in forests at elevations from 400 to 2,200 m (1,300 to 7,200 ft). As its common name suggests, it is hardy to USDA zone 7b.
