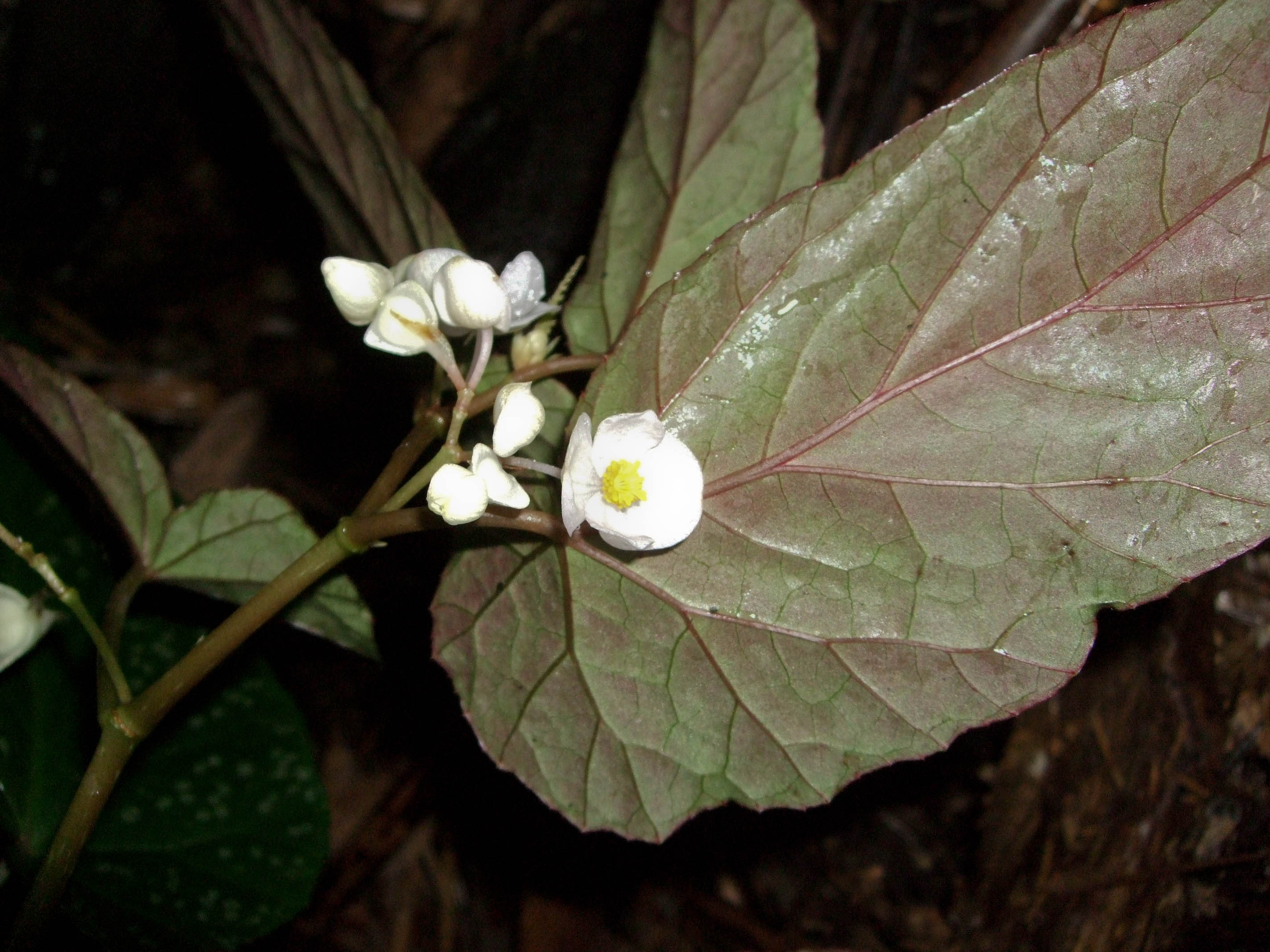

Scientific classification
- Kingdom: Plantae
- Clade: Tracheophytes
- Clade: Angiosperms
- Clade: Eudicots
- Clade: Rosids
- Order: Cucurbitales
- Family: Begoniaceae
- Genus: Begonia
- Species: B. taiwaniana

Binomial name
- Begonia taiwaniana Hayata

= Begonia taiwaniana =

Species of flowering plant

Begonia taiwaniana is a species of flowering plant found in Taiwan.
