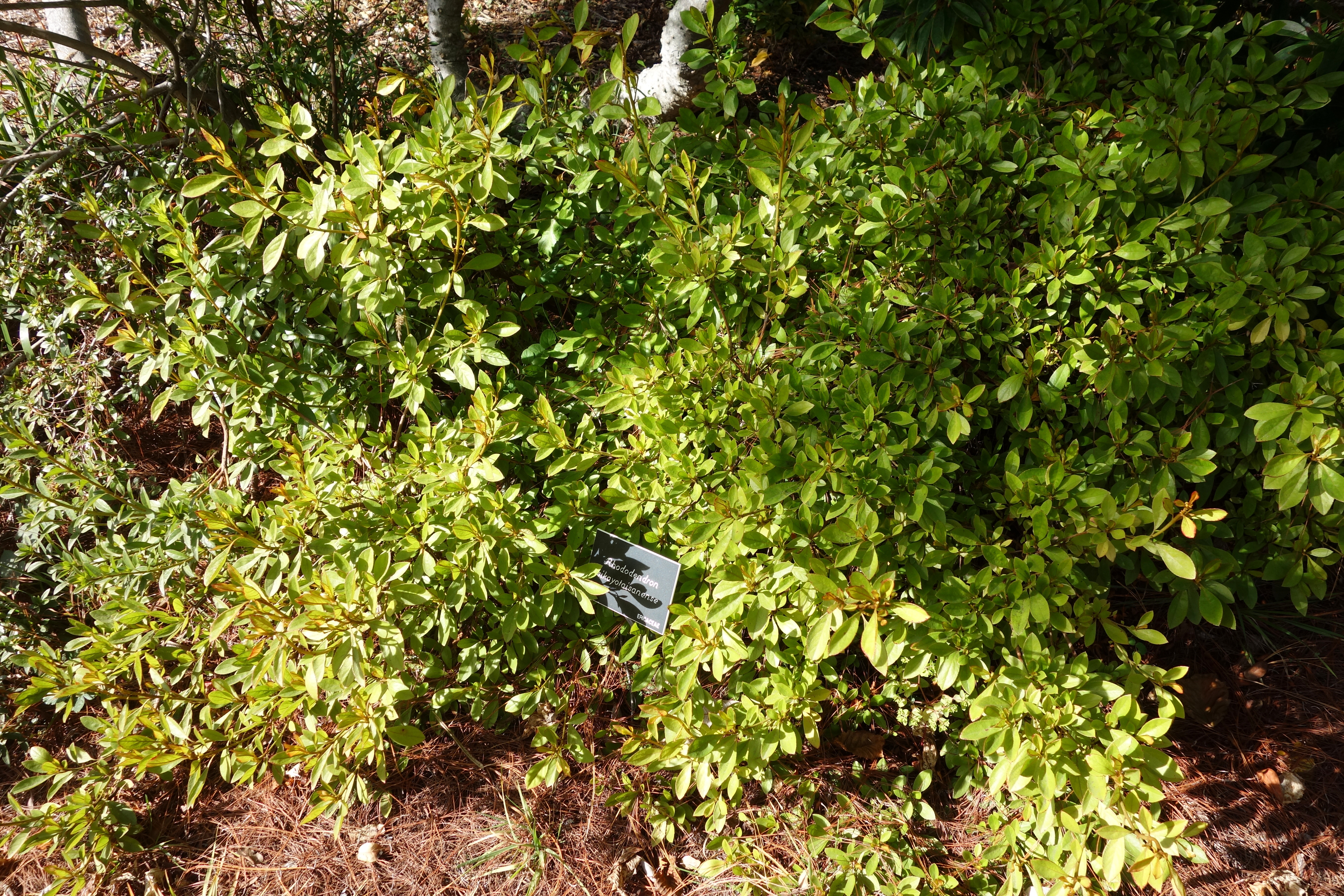

Scientific classification
- Kingdom: Plantae
- Clade: Tracheophytes
- Clade: Angiosperms
- Clade: Eudicots
- Clade: Asterids
- Order: Ericales
- Family: Ericaceae
- Genus: Rhododendron
- Species: R. sikayotaizanense

Binomial name
- Rhododendron sikayotaizanense Masam.

= Rhododendron sikayotaizanense =

Species of plant

Rhododendron sikayotaizanense (志佳阳杜鹃) is a rhododendron species native to Taiwan. It is a shrub with small, leathery leaves that are oblong to ovate-oblong, 0.4–1.4 cm (0.16–0.55 in) × 0.2–0.6 cm (0.079–0.236 in) in size. Flowers are red.
