= Quercus liaoi =

Conservation status
- Data Deficient (IUCN 3.1)

Scientific classification
- Kingdom: Plantae
- Clade: Embryophytes
- Clade: Tracheophytes
- Clade: Spermatophytes
- Clade: Angiosperms
- Clade: Eudicots
- Clade: Rosids
- Order: Fagales
- Family: Fagaceae
- Genus: Quercus
- Subgenus: Quercus subg. Cerris
- Section: Quercus sect. Cyclobalanopsis
- Species: Q. liaoi

Binomial name
- Quercus liaoi C.F.Shen

Species of flowering plant

Quercus liaoi is a species of oak. It is a tree endemic to Taiwan. Little is known about the species' habitat or population, other than that it grows in subtropical and temperate montane forests.
