= Salix doii =

Scientific classification
- Kingdom: Plantae
- Clade: Embryophytes
- Clade: Tracheophytes
- Clade: Spermatophytes
- Clade: Angiosperms
- Clade: Eudicots
- Clade: Rosids
- Order: Malpighiales
- Family: Salicaceae
- Genus: Salix
- Species: S. doii

Binomial name
- Salix doii Hayata

Species of willow

Salix doii is a shrub from the genus of the willow (Salix) with mostly 3 to 4 centimeters long leaf blades. The natural range of the species is in Taiwan.

== Description ==
Salix doii grows as a shrub up to 3 meters (9.8 ft) high. The branches are hairy to a greater or lesser extent. The leaves have a 0.8 to 1.5 centimeter long, downy hairy petiole. The leaf blade is oblong-lanceolate, 3 to 4 centimeters long and about 1 centimeter wide. The leaf margin is entire, the leaf base wedge-shaped-rounded to rounded, the leaf end pointed. The upper side of the leaf is sparsely hairy with shaggy hair, the underside with downy hair. Ten lateral nerves are formed on each side of the median artery.

The male inflorescences are 2.5 to 3, rarely up to 4 centimeters long, catkins. The peduncle is short and has one or two scaly, small leaves. The bracts are elongated or elliptical, downy hairy and ciliate and about half as long as the stamens. Male flowers have a short-cylindrical adaxial nectar gland. There will be two detached stamensformed, the stamens are finely haired near the base. The female catkins are about 3 centimeters long, when the fruit is ripe, 6 to 8 centimeters long and have a diameter of about 1.5 centimeters. The peduncle is about 1.5 centimeters long and has two or three small leaves. The bracts resemble those of the male inflorescences. Female flowers have an adaxial nectar gland. The ovary is narrow-ovate, finely hairy and long stalks, the stylus is short, the scar lapped four times. The fruits are slightly hairy capsules.

== Range ==
The natural range is on Taiwan. There the species grows in open areas and near rivers at altitudes of 2,000 to 2,800 meters (6,600 to 9,200 ft).

== Taxonomy ==
Salix doii is a kind from the kind of willow (Salix), in the family of the pasture plants (Salicaceae). There, it is the section Fulvopubescentes assigned. It was first scientifically described in 1915 by Hayata Bunzo. Synonyms of the species are Salix eriostroma Hayata, Salix fulvopubescens var. Doii (Hayata) KC Yang & TC Huang and Salix morii Hayata.

== Literature ==
- Wu Zheng-yi, Peter H. Raven (Ed.): Flora of China. Volume 4: Cycadaceae through Fagaceae. Science Press / Missouri Botanical Garden Press, Beijing / St. Louis 1999, ISBN 0-915279-70-3, pp. 190, 191 (English).
