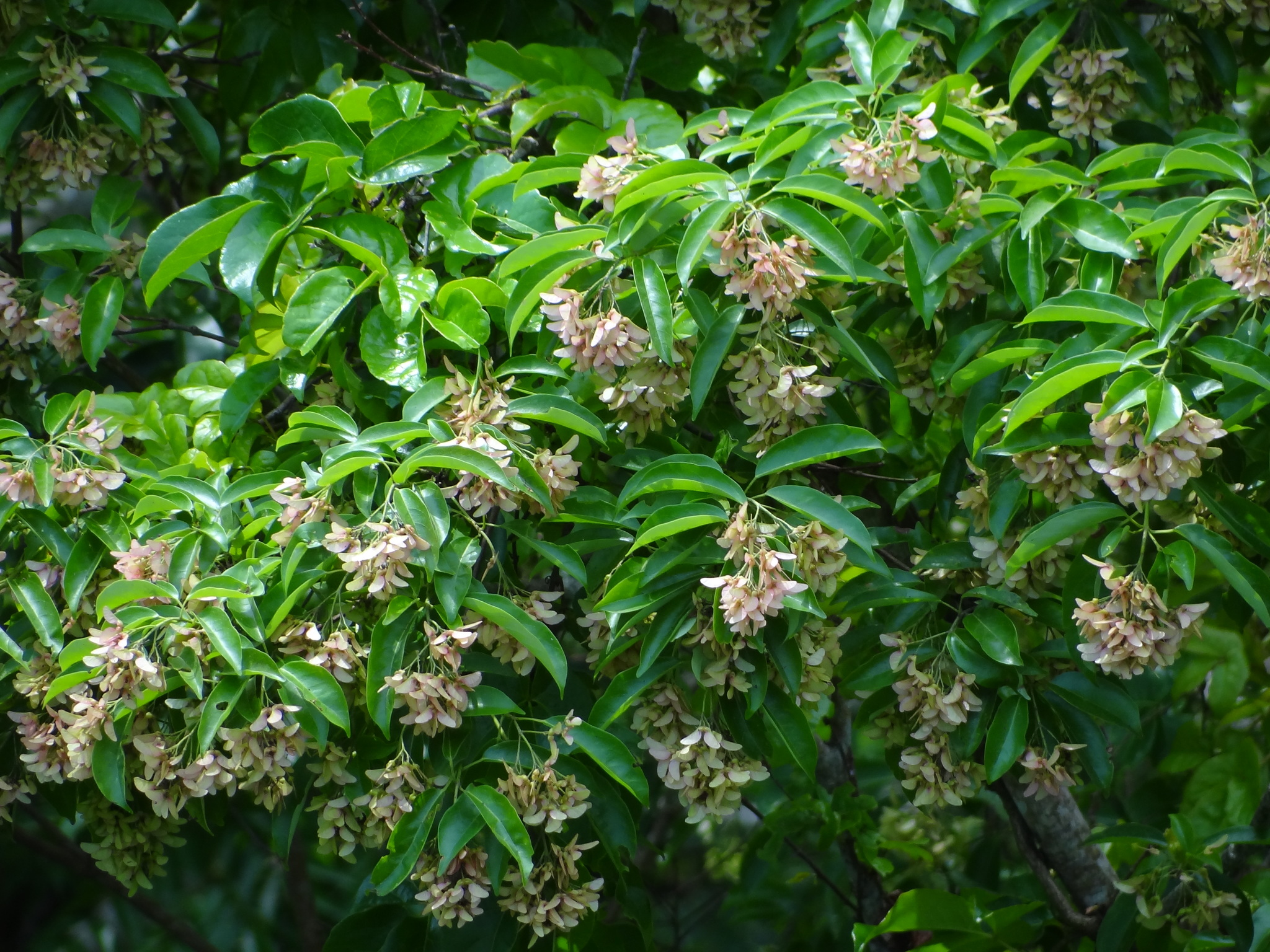

Scientific classification
- Kingdom: Plantae
- Clade: Tracheophytes
- Clade: Angiosperms
- Clade: Eudicots
- Clade: Rosids
- Order: Sapindales
- Family: Sapindaceae
- Genus: Acer
- Species: A. albopurpurascens

Binomial name
- Acer albopurpurascens Hayata (1911)

Synonyms
- Acer hypoleucum Hayata (1913); Acer litseifolium Hayata (1913); Acer oblongum var. albopurpurascens (Hayata) S.S.Ying (1998)

= Acer albopurpurascens =

Species of flowering plant

Acer albopurpurascens is a species of maple. It is a tree endemic to Taiwan.
