= Daphne esquirolii =

Scientific classification
- Kingdom: Plantae
- Clade: Tracheophytes
- Clade: Angiosperms
- Clade: Eudicots
- Clade: Rosids
- Order: Malvales
- Family: Thymelaeaceae
- Genus: Daphne
- Species: D. esquirolii

Binomial name
- Daphne esquirolii H.Lév.

Synonyms
- Daphne leuconeura Rehder; Daphne leuconeura var. mairei H.Lév. & Rehder; Stellera mairei Lecomte; Wikstroemia leuconeura (Rehder) Domke; Wikstroemia mairei (Lecomte) Domke

Species of shrub

Daphne esquirolii is a shrub, of the family Thymelaeaceae. It is deciduous, and is found in Sichuan and Yunnan.

== Description ==
The shrub grows to a height of 0.5 to 1.5 m. Its flowers are small, and grow in groups. It does not produce visible fruit. It is generally found at altitudes from 700 to 2,000 m, but sometimes as high as 3,400 m.

== Taxonomy ==
In 1997, Josef Halda included Daphne pedunculata in D. esquirolii as subsp. pedunculata. As of October 2025, this was not accepted by Plants of the World Online or the Flora of China.
