= Daphne wangiana =

Scientific classification
- Kingdom: Plantae
- Clade: Tracheophytes
- Clade: Angiosperms
- Clade: Eudicots
- Clade: Rosids
- Order: Malvales
- Family: Thymelaeaceae
- Genus: Daphne
- Species: D. wangiana

Binomial name
- Daphne wangiana (Hamaya) Halda

Synonyms
- Daphne holosericea var. wangiana Hamaya

Species of plant

Daphne wangiana is a species of flowering plant in the family Thymelaeaceae, endemic to the southeast of Tibet.

== Description ==
Daphne wangiana is a short shrub growing to about 30 cm tall. Its leaves are alternate. The leaf blade is more-or-less linear, about 1.5 to 2.5 mm wide. The flowers are borne in terminal inflorescences. Like all Daphne species, the flowers are without petals. The calyx is green, forming a tube 3 to 6 mm long by about 1.5 mm wide, with four unequal lobes about 2 to 3 mm long. The eight stamens are arranged in two whorls. The fruit is a yellowish green drupe, ovoid in shape and about 5 mm long.

== Taxonomy ==
Daphne wangiana was first described in 1963 as Daphne holosericea var. wangiana. However, the flower of D. wangiana consists of a four-lobed calyx, unlike that of D. holosericea which has five lobes. Along with other differences, this supports the raising of the taxon to a full species by Josef Halda in 2000.
