= Daphne pachyphylla =

Scientific classification
- Kingdom: Plantae
- Clade: Tracheophytes
- Clade: Angiosperms
- Clade: Eudicots
- Clade: Rosids
- Order: Malvales
- Family: Thymelaeaceae
- Genus: Daphne
- Species: D. pachyphylla

Binomial name
- Daphne pachyphylla D.Fang

Species of plant

Daphne pachyphylla is a species of flowering plant in the family Thymelaeaceae, native to China (west Guangxi). It was first described in 2001.

== Description ==
Daphne pachyphylla is an evergreen shrub, growing to about 70 cm tall. Its branches are dark gray, with sparse brownish hairs when young. The leaves are alternate and have a petiole about 2 to 5 mm long. The leathery leaf blade is narrowly oblong or elliptical, about 5 to 11 cm long and 15 to 38 mm wide, occasionally less. It is brownish underneath. The four-lobed flowers are borne in terminal inflorescences on reduced lateral branches. Each inflorescence has 5 to 15 flowers. The calyx is white. The eight stamens are arranged in two whorls.

== Taxonomy ==
Daphne pachyphylla was first described in 2001. It is one of a group of species that includes D. bholua and D. papyracea. It can be distinguished by the brownish undersides of the thickly leathery leaf blades which have ciliate margins and tufted apices.

== Distribution and habitat ==
Daphne pachyphylla is native to west Guangxi in China. It is found in torests on limestone hills at altitudes of 1,200 to 1,300 m.
