= Daphne rhynchocarpa =

Scientific classification
- Kingdom: Plantae
- Clade: Tracheophytes
- Clade: Angiosperms
- Clade: Eudicots
- Clade: Rosids
- Order: Malvales
- Family: Thymelaeaceae
- Genus: Daphne
- Species: D. rhynchocarpa

Binomial name
- Daphne rhynchocarpa C.Y.Chang

Species of shrub

Daphne rhynchocarpa is a shrub, of the family Thymelaeaceae. It is native to China, specifically Southwest Yunnan.

== Description ==
The shrub is evergreen, and grows up to a height of 3 m. Its branches are gray-brown in color. It is often found in forests at an altitude of around 2500 m.
