= Daphne modesta =

Scientific classification
- Kingdom: Plantae
- Clade: Tracheophytes
- Clade: Angiosperms
- Clade: Eudicots
- Clade: Rosids
- Order: Malvales
- Family: Thymelaeaceae
- Genus: Daphne
- Species: D. modesta

Binomial name
- Daphne modesta Rehder

Species of shrub

Daphne modesta is a shrub, of the family Thymelaeaceae. It is native to China, specifically Sichuan and Yunnan.

== Description ==
Daphne modesta is small and deciduous. It grows to 30 to 50 cm in height, with small elliptical leaves about 1.5 to 3.5 cm in length and 0.3 to 0.7 cm in width. It has small long flowers, usually golden-yellow in color.
