= Daphne tenuiflora =

Scientific classification
- Kingdom: Plantae
- Clade: Tracheophytes
- Clade: Angiosperms
- Clade: Eudicots
- Clade: Rosids
- Order: Malvales
- Family: Thymelaeaceae
- Genus: Daphne
- Species: D. tenuiflora

Binomial name
- Daphne tenuiflora Bureau & Franch.

Synonyms
- Stellera tenuiflora (Bureau & Franch.) Lecomte; Wikstroemia tenuiflora (Bureau & Franch.) Domke

Species of shrub

Daphne tenuiflora is a small shrub, of the family Thymelaeaceae. D. tenuiflora is native to China (Sichuan and Yunnan) and Myanmar.

Daphne tenuiflora is an evergreen shub, reaching about 0.5 m tall. It has long slender branches. It is often found in mountain forests and shrubby slopes at around 2,700–3,500 m in altitude.
