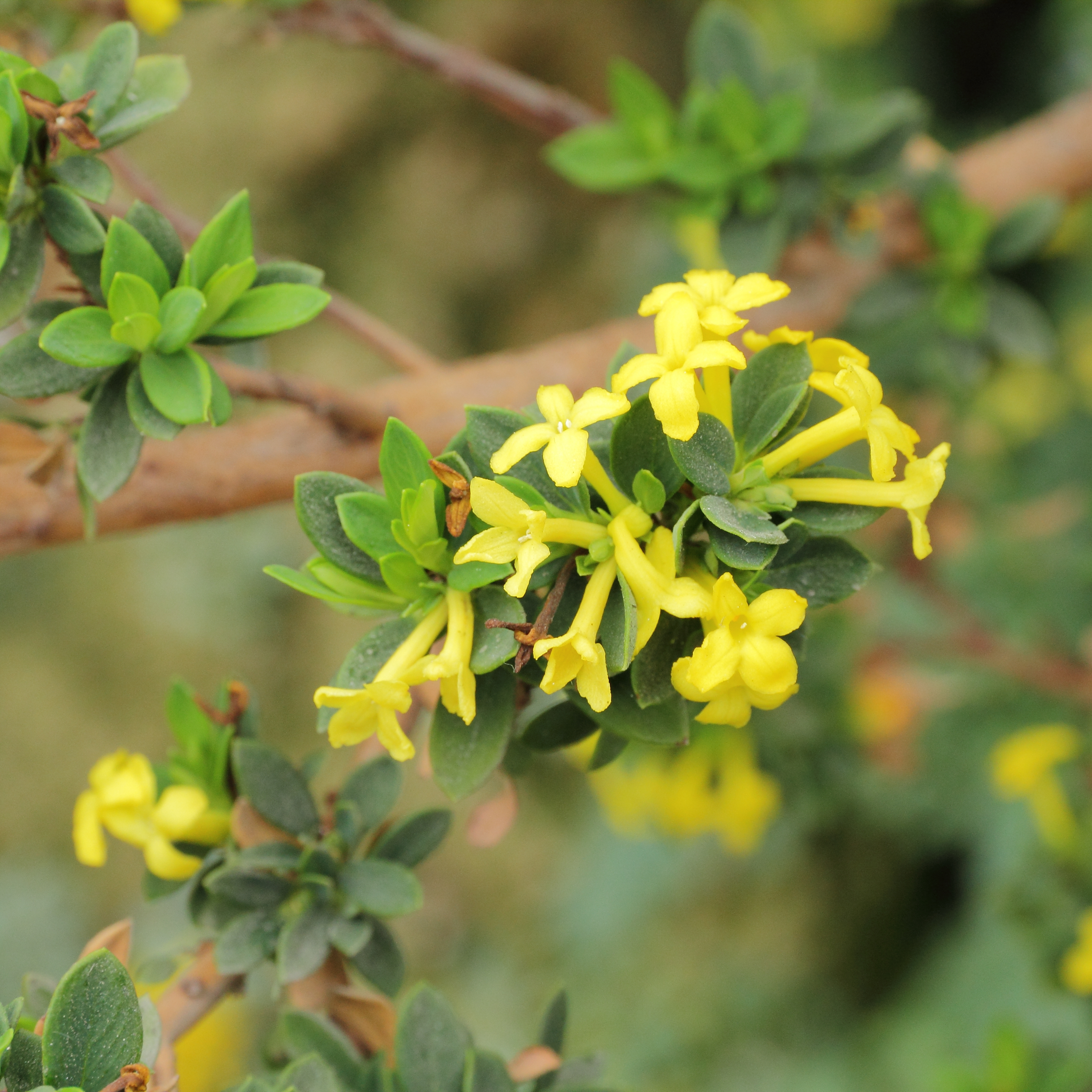

Scientific classification
- Kingdom: Plantae
- Clade: Tracheophytes
- Clade: Angiosperms
- Clade: Eudicots
- Clade: Rosids
- Order: Malvales
- Family: Thymelaeaceae
- Genus: Daphne
- Species: D. aurantiaca

Binomial name
- Daphne aurantiaca Diels.

= Daphne aurantiaca =

Species of shrub

Daphne aurantiaca (syn. Daphne calcicola) is a shrub of the family Thymelaeaceae. It is native to China, specifically Sichuan and Yunnan.

== Description ==
The shrub is evergreen, and grows from 0.6 to 1.2 meters tall. Its different variants grow either erect or more prostrate, accounting for the variance in height. It is often found on slopes and ledges, particularly the faces of limestone cliffs. It was introduced to European gardens by George Forrest in 1906, from collections in the Lijiang Range in NW Yunnan. He described it as "One of the most beautiful plants in western Yunnan".

== Varieties ==
There are two varieties:

- Daphne aurantiaca var. aurantiaca is taller and grows erect
- Daphne aurantiaca var. calcicola grows more prostrate and irregularly: it has been treated as a separate species, Daphne calcicola: its compact growth makes it more attractive to gardeners
