= Daphne jinzhaiensis =

Scientific classification
- Kingdom: Plantae
- Clade: Tracheophytes
- Clade: Angiosperms
- Clade: Eudicots
- Clade: Rosids
- Order: Malvales
- Family: Thymelaeaceae
- Genus: Daphne
- Species: D. jinzhaiensis

Binomial name
- Daphne jinzhaiensis D.C.Zhang & J.Z.Shao

Synonyms

Species of plant

Daphne jinzhaiensis is a species of flowering plant in the family Thymelaeaceae, native to China (Anhui). It was first described in 1840.

Daphne jinzhaiensis differs from Daphne genkwa in its terminal 3–5-flowered racemes, each flower having a tube 10–12 mm long.
