= Daphne xichouensis =

Scientific classification
- Kingdom: Plantae
- Clade: Tracheophytes
- Clade: Angiosperms
- Clade: Eudicots
- Clade: Rosids
- Order: Malvales
- Family: Thymelaeaceae
- Genus: Daphne
- Species: D. xichouensis

Binomial name
- Daphne xichouensis H.F.Zhou ex C.Y.Chang

Synonyms
- Daphne papyracea var. xichouensis (H.F.Zhou ex C.Y.Chang) Halda

Species of plant

Daphne xichouensis is a species of flowering plant in the family Thymelaeaceae, native to China (southeast Yunnan). It was first described in 1985.

Daphne xichouensis has reddish-white flowers and is found at 1,500–1,800 m on moist shrubby slopes.
