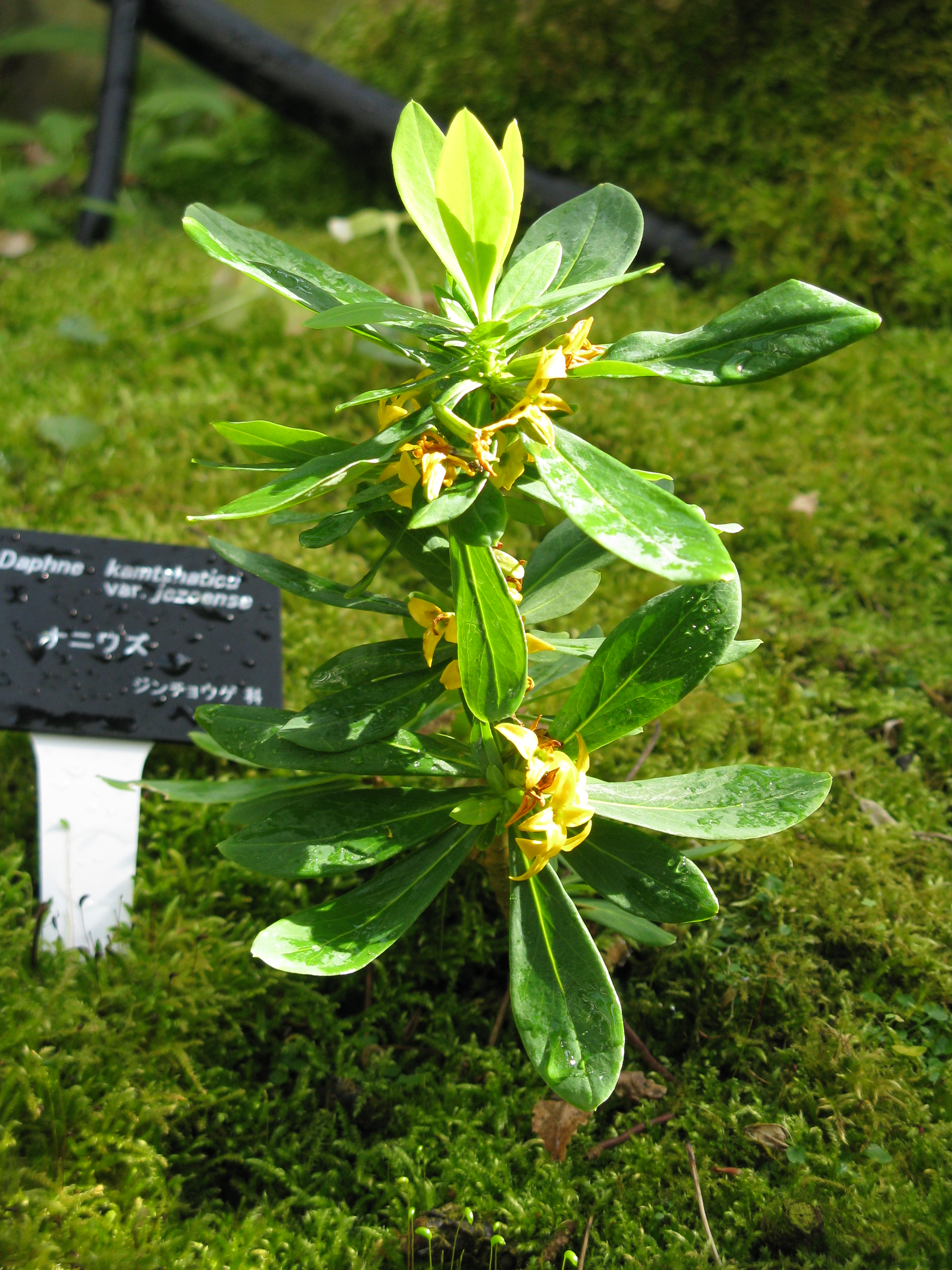

Scientific classification
- Kingdom: Plantae
- Clade: Tracheophytes
- Clade: Angiosperms
- Clade: Eudicots
- Clade: Rosids
- Order: Malvales
- Family: Thymelaeaceae
- Genus: Daphne
- Species: D. kamtschatica

Binomial name
- Daphne kamtschatica Maxim.

Synonyms
- Daphne koreana Nakai; Daphne pseudomezereum var. koreana (Nakai) Hamaya

= Daphne kamtschatica =

Species of shrub

Daphne kamtschatica is a species of shrub in the family Thymelaeaceae. It is native to parts of Korea and Japan, as well as Kamchatka.

== Description ==
The shrub is deciduous, and grows from 30 to 50 cm tall. It has oblong leaves and small greenish flowers.
