= Daphne rosmarinifolia =

Scientific classification
- Kingdom: Plantae
- Clade: Tracheophytes
- Clade: Angiosperms
- Clade: Eudicots
- Clade: Rosids
- Order: Malvales
- Family: Thymelaeaceae
- Genus: Daphne
- Species: D. rosmarinifolia

Binomial name
- Daphne rosmarinifolia Rehder

Species of shrub

Daphne rosmarinifolia is a shrub, of the family Thymelaeaceae. It is native to China, specifically Gansu, parts of Sichuan, and Yunnan.

== Description ==
The shrub is evergreen, and grows from 0.3 to 1.0 m tall. Its yellowish green branches grow dense. It is often found on shrubby slopes at altitudes of 2500 to 3800 m.
