= Daphne rodriguezii =

Conservation status
- Endangered (IUCN 3.1)

Scientific classification
- Kingdom: Plantae
- Clade: Tracheophytes
- Clade: Angiosperms
- Clade: Eudicots
- Clade: Rosids
- Order: Malvales
- Family: Thymelaeaceae
- Genus: Daphne
- Species: D. rodriguezii

Binomial name
- Daphne rodriguezii Texidor

Synonyms
- Daphne vellaeoides J.J.Rodr.

Species of shrub

Daphne rodriguezii is a shrub, of the family Thymelaeaceae. It is endemic to Menorca, one of the Balearic Islands that belongs to Spain.

== Description ==
The shrub grows to about half a metre in height. It is evergreen. It grows small white flowers, and orange fruits. It grows at altitudes between 5 and 80 metres.

== Conservation ==
In the European Union it has been designated as a 'priority species' under Annex II of the Habitats Directive since 1992, which means areas in which it occurs can be declared Special Areas of Conservation, if these areas belong to one of the number of habitats listed in Annex I of the directive.
