= Daphne arisanensis =

Scientific classification
- Kingdom: Plantae
- Clade: Tracheophytes
- Clade: Angiosperms
- Clade: Eudicots
- Clade: Rosids
- Order: Malvales
- Family: Thymelaeaceae
- Genus: Daphne
- Species: D. arisanensis

Binomial name
- Daphne arisanensis Hayata

Species of shrub

Daphne arisanensis is a shrub of the family Thymelaeaceae. It is endemic to Taiwan.

== Description ==
The shrub is evergreen, and grows from 2 to 3 m tall. Its branches are grayish and slender. The plant bears orange fruits. It is found in forests up to an altitude of around 3,000 m.
