= Daphne erosiloba =

Scientific classification
- Kingdom: Plantae
- Clade: Tracheophytes
- Clade: Angiosperms
- Clade: Eudicots
- Clade: Rosids
- Order: Malvales
- Family: Thymelaeaceae
- Genus: Daphne
- Species: D. erosiloba

Binomial name
- Daphne erosiloba C.Y.Chang

Species of shrub

Daphne erosiloba is a shrub, of the family Thymelaeaceae. It is endemic to China, specifically western Sichuan.

== Description ==
The shrub is deciduous, and grows from 0.5 to 1.0 meters tall. Its branches are slender and dense, but do not bear fruit. It is often found in sunny herbaceous slopes at around 3,200–3,800 meters in altitude.
