= Daphne morrisonensis =

Scientific classification
- Kingdom: Plantae
- Clade: Tracheophytes
- Clade: Angiosperms
- Clade: Eudicots
- Clade: Rosids
- Order: Malvales
- Family: Thymelaeaceae
- Genus: Daphne
- Species: D. morrisonensis

Binomial name
- Daphne morrisonensis C.E.Chang

Species of plant

Daphne morrisonensis is a species of flowering plant in the family Thymelaeaceae, native to Taiwan. It was first described in 1993.

== Description ==
Daphne morrisonensis is a evergreen shrub, growing to 2 to 3 m high. It has hairless (glabrous) branches and leaves. The leaves are alternate and have either no petiole or a very short one. The thick leaf blades are narrow, about 4 to 7 cm long and 0.3 to 0.4 cm wide. The four-lobed flowers are borne in terminal or axillary inflorescences with up to seven flowers.

== Distribution and habitat ==
Daphne morrisonensis is native to the Mount Yushan in Taiwan. It occurs on rocky slopes in open mountain forests.
