= Daphne gracilis =

Scientific classification
- Kingdom: Plantae
- Clade: Tracheophytes
- Clade: Angiosperms
- Clade: Eudicots
- Clade: Rosids
- Order: Malvales
- Family: Thymelaeaceae
- Genus: Daphne
- Species: D. gracilis

Binomial name
- Daphne gracilis E.Pritz.

Species of shrub

Daphne gracilis is a shrub, of the family Thymelaeaceae. It is native to China, specifically Chongqing.

== Description ==
The shrub is evergreen, and grows from 0.3 to 1.5 meters tall. Its yellowish brown or purplish branches grow dense, tall, and slender. It is often found on slopes at altitudes of 1000 to 1300 meters.
