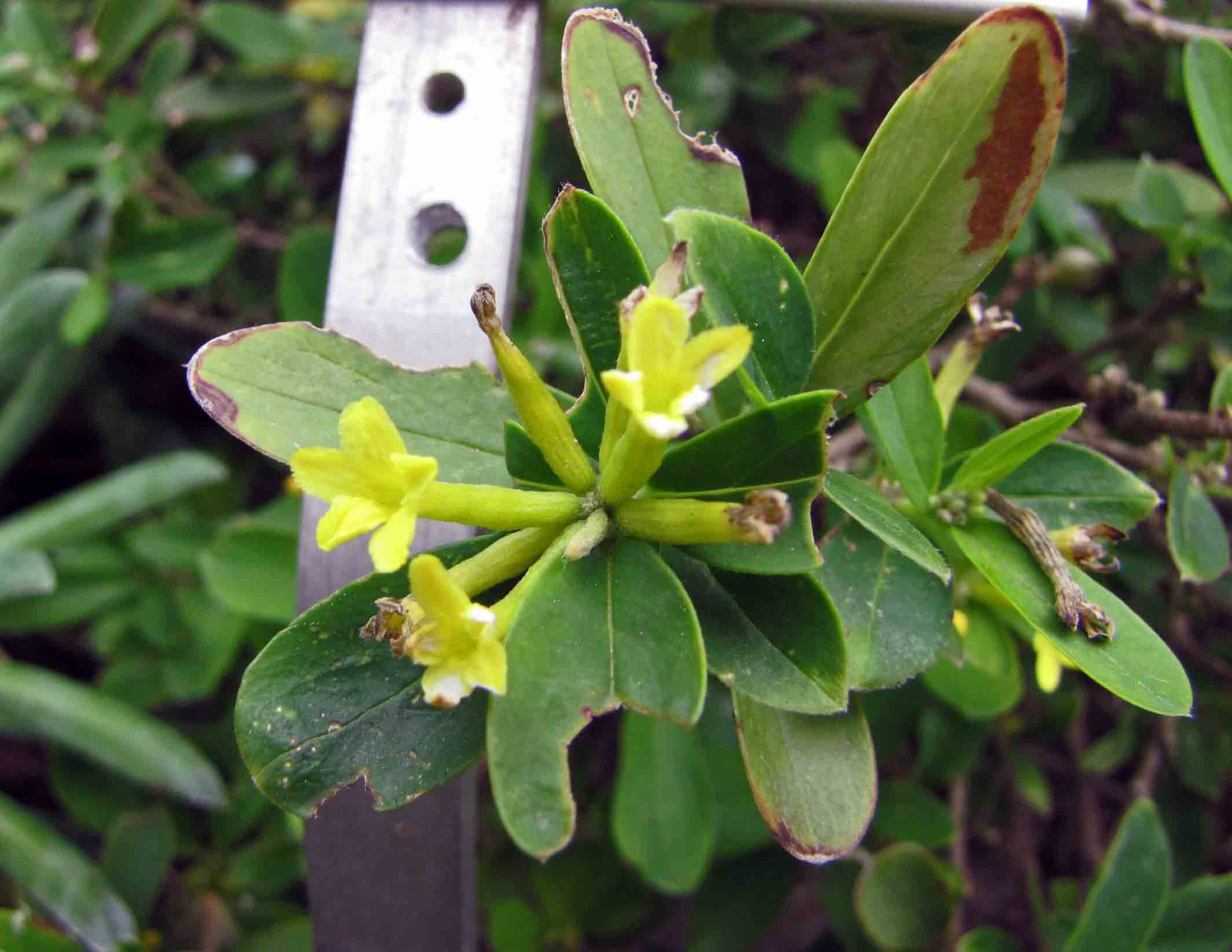

Scientific classification
- Kingdom: Plantae
- Clade: Tracheophytes
- Clade: Angiosperms
- Clade: Eudicots
- Clade: Rosids
- Order: Malvales
- Family: Thymelaeaceae
- Genus: Daphne
- Species: D. gemmata

Binomial name
- Daphne gemmata E.Pritz. ex Diels

= Daphne gemmata =

Species of shrub

Daphne gemmata is a shrub, of the family Thymelaeaceae. It is native to China, specifically Sichuan and Yunnan.

== Description ==
The shrub is normally deciduous, and grows from 0.3 to 1.0 meters tall. Its yellowish brown or purplish branches are broom-like. It is often found on cliffs and dry sunny banks at altitudes of 400 to 1500 meters.
