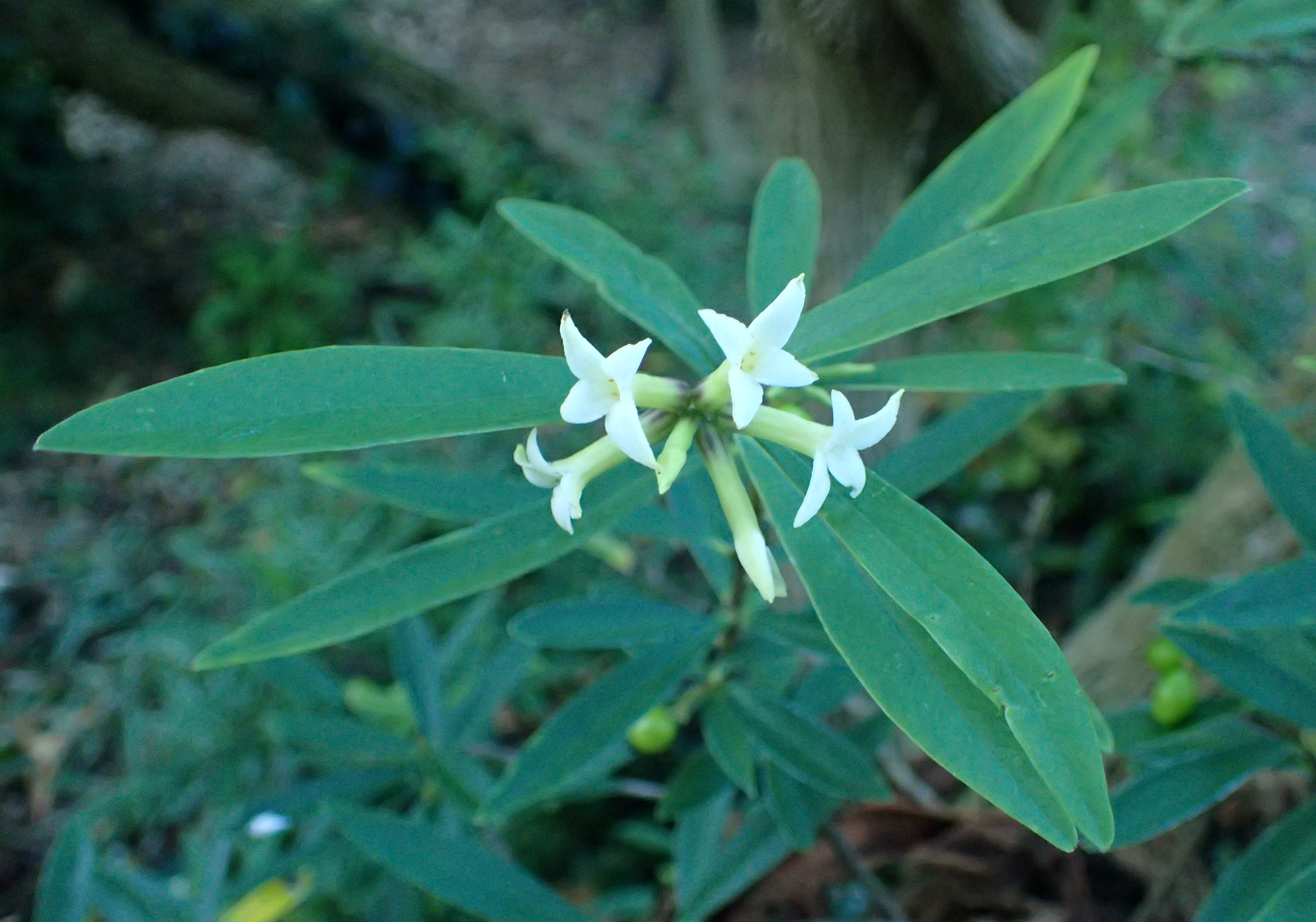

Scientific classification
- Kingdom: Plantae
- Clade: Tracheophytes
- Clade: Angiosperms
- Clade: Eudicots
- Clade: Rosids
- Order: Malvales
- Family: Thymelaeaceae
- Genus: Daphne
- Species: D. acutiloba

Binomial name
- Daphne acutiloba Rehder

= Daphne acutiloba =

Species of shrub

Daphne acutiloba is a shrub, of the family Thymelaeaceae. It is evergreen, and is found in China, specifically Hubei, Sichuan, and Yunnan.

== Description ==
The shrub grows to a height of 0.5 to 2 m. It grows small white flowers in clusters. It is very similar to Daphne longilobata in appearance. It is found at altitudes ranging from 1400 to 3000 m.
