= Daphne chingshuishaniana =

Scientific classification
- Kingdom: Plantae
- Clade: Tracheophytes
- Clade: Angiosperms
- Clade: Eudicots
- Clade: Rosids
- Order: Malvales
- Family: Thymelaeaceae
- Genus: Daphne
- Species: D. chingshuishaniana

Binomial name
- Daphne chingshuishaniana S.S.Ying

Species of plant

Daphne chingshuishaniana is a species of flowering plant in the family Thymelaeaceae, native to Taiwan. It was first described in 1988.

== Description ==
Daphne chingshuishaniana is a evergreen shrub, growing to about 2 m high. It has erect yellowish green branches that are hairless. Its leaves are alternate and have a short petiole, 2 to 3 mm long. The leaf blades are leathery, about 1.5 to 2.5 cm long and 1 to 1.5 cm wide. The flowers are borne in terminal inflorescences with six to nine flowers. Like all Daphne species, the flowers are without petals, being formed from four fused sepals. Flowering is in June in the native habitat of the species.

== Distribution and habitat ==
Daphne chingshuishaniana is native to east Taiwan. It grows on shrubby slopes near the summits of mountains at elevations around 2,200 m.
