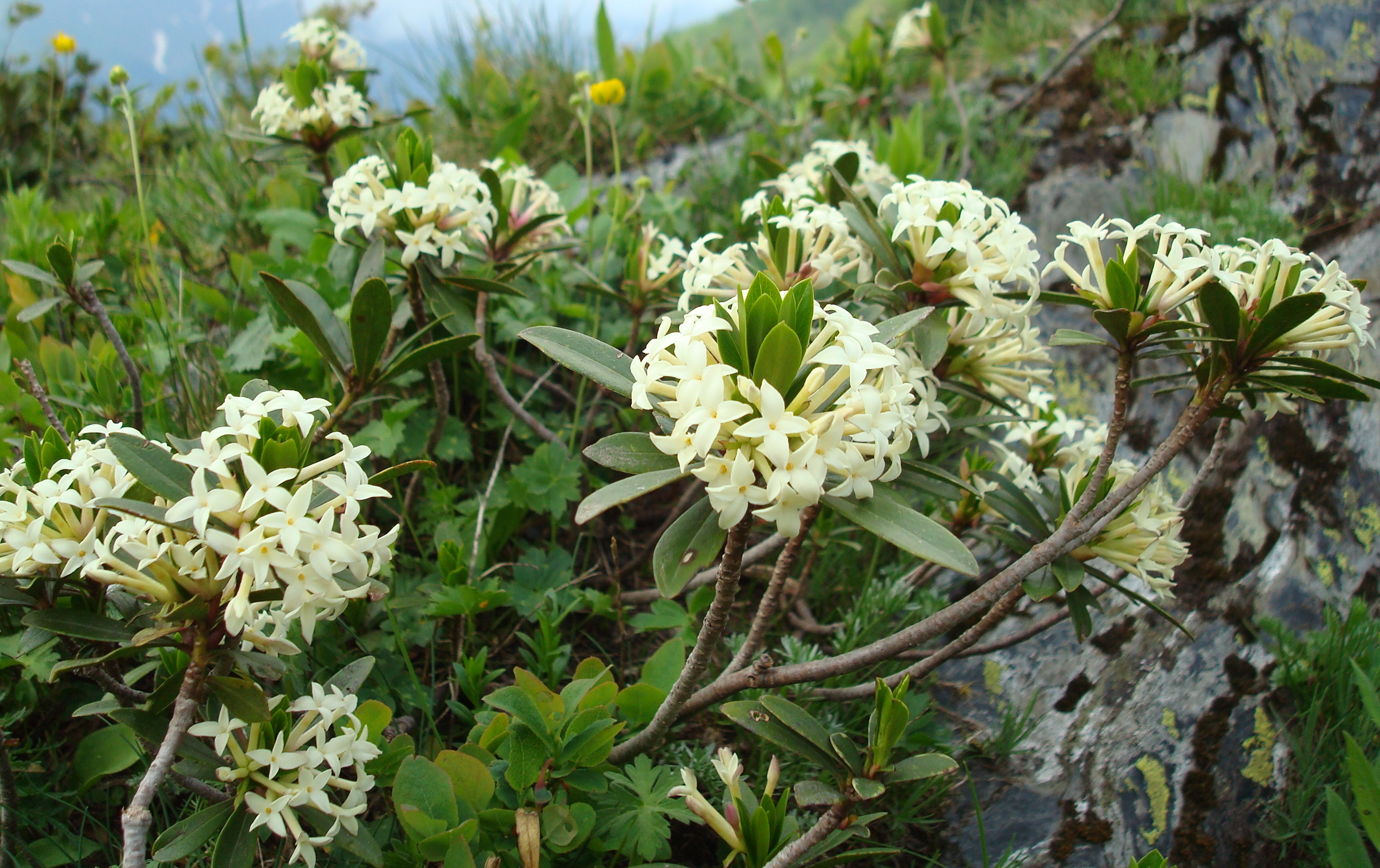

Scientific classification
- Kingdom: Plantae
- Clade: Tracheophytes
- Clade: Angiosperms
- Clade: Eudicots
- Clade: Rosids
- Order: Malvales
- Family: Thymelaeaceae
- Genus: Daphne
- Species: D. glomerata

Binomial name
- Daphne glomerata Lam.

= Daphne glomerata =

Species of shrub

Daphne glomerata is a shrub, of the family Thymelaeaceae. It is evergreen, and is found in Turkey and Caucasus.

== Description ==
The shrub grows to a height of 20 cm and a width of 1 m. It grows small white flowers, in clusters of up to 30, and red fruits. It blooms from early to mid summer.
