= Daphne limprichtii =

Scientific classification
- Kingdom: Plantae
- Clade: Tracheophytes
- Clade: Angiosperms
- Clade: Eudicots
- Clade: Rosids
- Order: Malvales
- Family: Thymelaeaceae
- Genus: Daphne
- Species: D. limprichtii

Binomial name
- Daphne limprichtii H.J.P.Winkl.

Species of shrub

Daphne limprichtii is a species in the family Thymelaeaceae.
