= Daphne angustiloba =

Scientific classification
- Kingdom: Plantae
- Clade: Tracheophytes
- Clade: Angiosperms
- Clade: Eudicots
- Clade: Rosids
- Order: Malvales
- Family: Thymelaeaceae
- Genus: Daphne
- Species: D. angustiloba

Binomial name
- Daphne angustiloba Rehder

Synonyms
- Wikstroemia angustiloba (Rehder) Domke

Species of plant

Daphne angustiloba is a species of flowering plant in the family Thymelaeaceae, native to China (west and southwest Sichuan) and northern Myanmar. It was first described by Alfred Rehder in 1916.
