= Daphne championii =

Scientific classification
- Kingdom: Plantae
- Clade: Tracheophytes
- Clade: Angiosperms
- Clade: Eudicots
- Clade: Rosids
- Order: Malvales
- Family: Thymelaeaceae
- Genus: Daphne
- Species: D. championii

Binomial name
- Daphne championii Benth.

Species of shrub

Daphne championii is a shrub, of the family Thymelaeaceae. It is native to China, specifically Guangxi, Guangdong, and other provinces in China.

== Description ==
The shrub is evergreen and grows from 0.5 to 1.0 m tall. Its branches are dense, slender, and elongated. It flowers from February to April and grows on low mountains at altitudes ranging from 200 to 650 m.
