= Daphne emeiensis =

Scientific classification
- Kingdom: Plantae
- Clade: Tracheophytes
- Clade: Angiosperms
- Clade: Eudicots
- Clade: Rosids
- Order: Malvales
- Family: Thymelaeaceae
- Genus: Daphne
- Species: D. emeiensis

Binomial name
- Daphne emeiensis C.Y.Chang

Synonyms
- Daphne bholua subsp. emeiensis (C.Y.Chang) Halda

Species of plant

Daphne emeiensis is a species of flowering plant in the family Thymelaeaceae, endemic to China (Sichuan). It was first described in 1986. Daphne emeiensis is evergreen, and grows from 0.5 to 1.0 m tall. It is often found in forests and at edges of forests at altitudes of 800 to 1,120 m.
