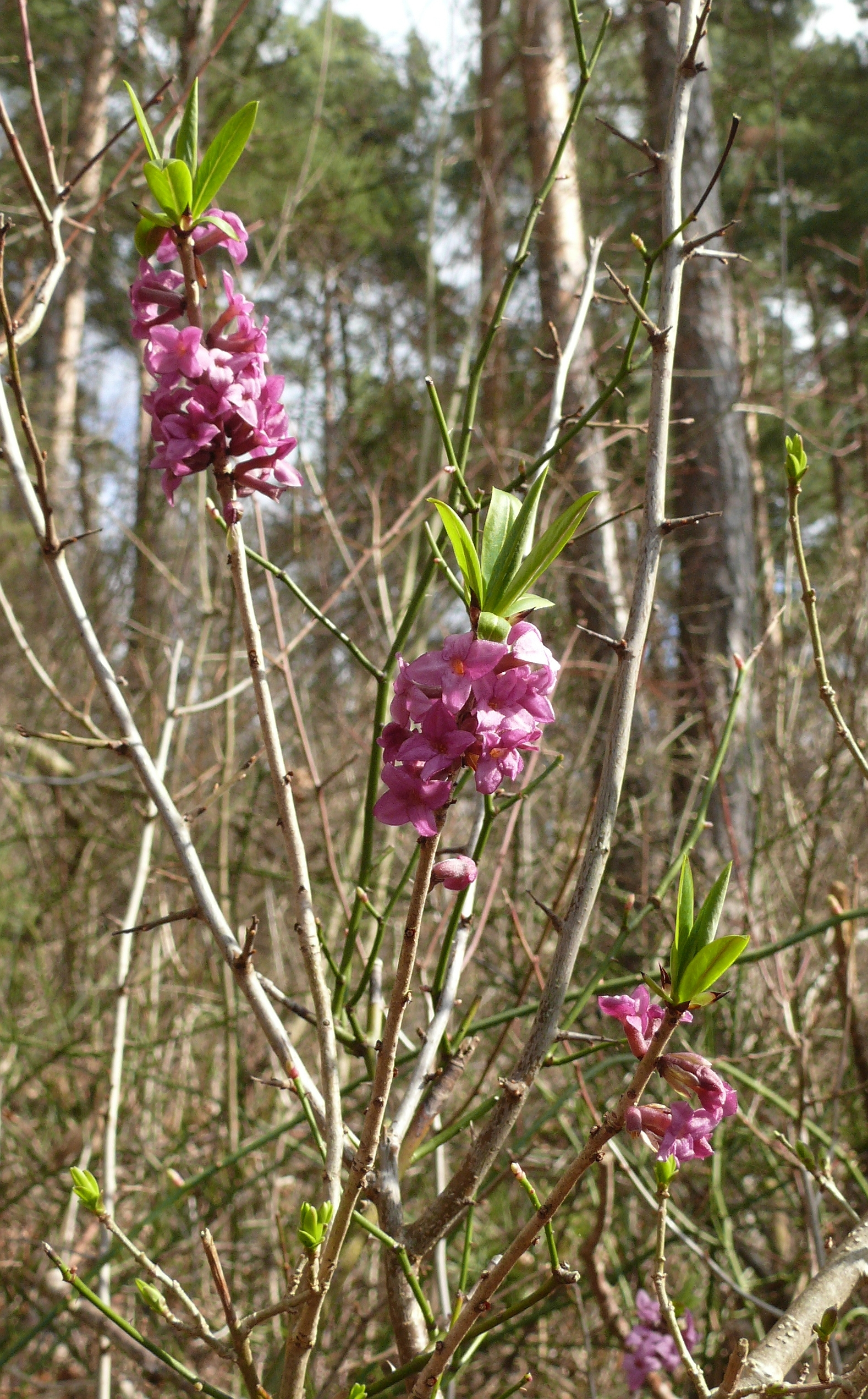
- Daphne mezereum in flower

Scientific classification
- Kingdom: Plantae
- Clade: Embryophytes
- Clade: Tracheophytes
- Clade: Spermatophytes
- Clade: Angiosperms
- Clade: Eudicots
- Clade: Rosids
- Order: Malvales
- Family: Thymelaeaceae
- Subfamily: Thymelaeoideae
- Genus: Daphne; L.

Species
- See text

Synonyms
- Daphmanthus F.K.Ward; Farreria Balf.f. & W.W.Sm. ex Farrer; Laureola Hill; Mezereum C.A.Mey.; Mistralia Fourr.; Nemoctis Raf.; Pentathymelaea Lecomte; Thymelaea All.; Tumelaia Raf.

= Daphne (plant) =

Genus of flowering plants

Daphne /ˈdæfni/ (Ancient Greek: δάφνη, romanized: daphne, "laurel") is a genus of between 70 and 95 species of deciduous and evergreen shrubs in the family Thymelaeaceae, native to Asia, Europe and north Africa. They are noted for their scented flowers and often brightly coloured berries. Two species are used to make paper. Many species are grown in gardens as ornamental plants; the smaller species are often used in rock gardens. All parts of daphnes are poisonous for humans, especially the berries, though birds eat these freely to disperse the seeds.

== Description ==
Daphne species are shrubs, with upright or prostrate stems. Upright species may grow to 1.5 m (5 ft), with D. gnidium reported to 2 m (7 ft), and D. bholua to 4 m (13 ft). Their leaves are undivided, mostly arranged spirally or alternately (although opposite in D. genkwa), and have short petioles (stalks). The leaves tend to be clustered towards the end of the stems and are of different shapes, although always longer than wide. The leaf surface may be smooth (glabrous) or hairy.

Many species flower in late winter or very early spring. The flowers are grouped into clusters (inflorescences), either in the leaf axils towards the end of the stems or forming terminal heads. The inflorescences lack bracts. The individual flowers completely lack petals, and are formed by four (rarely five) petaloid sepals, tubular at the base with free lobes at the apex. They range in colour from white, greenish yellow or yellow to bright pink and purple. Most of the evergreen species have greenish flowers, while the deciduous species tend to have pink flowers. There are twice the number of stamens as sepals, usually eight, arranged in two series. Stamens either have short filaments or lack filaments altogether and are usually held inside the sepal tube. The style is short or absent, and the stigma is head-shaped (capitate).

The ovary has a single chamber (locule). The fruit is one-seeded, and is either a fleshy berry, or a dry and leathery drupe. When ripe the fruit is usually red or yellow, sometimes black.

== Taxonomy ==
The genus Daphne was first described by Carl Linnaeus in 1753 in Species Plantarum. Linnaeus included ten species, including Daphne mezereum, Daphne laureola and Daphne cneorum. Some of his species are now placed in other related genera (e.g. Linnaeus's Daphne thymelaea is now Thymelaea sanamunda). The type species of the genus is Daphne laureola. The number of species in the genus varies considerably between different authorities. The Flora of China states there are about 95 species, 41 of which are endemic to China, and the Euro+Med Plantbase accepts 21 species in the Western Palaearctic region. Some of these species were reduced to subspecies or varieties by Josef Halda in a series of papers from 1997 onwards, culminating in a monograph on the genus. Version 1.1 of The Plant List accepts 83 species.

=== Phylogeny and generic limits ===
A 2002 study based on chloroplast DNA placed Daphne in a group of related genera; however there was only one species representing each genus.

- - Edgeworthia
  - - - Wikstroemia
      - Stellera
    - - Diarthron
      - - Thymelaea
        - Daphne

A study published in 2009 included an extra species of Wikstroemia and suggested that this genus was paraphyletic with respect to Stellera, but otherwise agreed with the cladogram above. The distinction between Wikstroemia and Daphne is difficult to make; Halda included Wikstroemia within Daphne. The cladogram shown above suggests that other genera would need to be included as well to make Daphne monophyletic.

Two further studies in 2022 and 2023, revealed that Wikstroemia and Daphne formed two closely related but distinct groups, though some species (D. genkwa, D. angustiloba, D. aurantiaca, D. holosericea) would need to be transferred from Daphne to Wikstroemia (and possibly others in the reverse direction) to give reciprocally monophyletic genera; and additionally, that one species (Daphne championii) should be transferred to another genus, with its closest relative among the species analysed being Edgeworthia chrysantha. The necessary formal new combinations were however not made in either paper.

=== Species ===
As of October 2025, Plants of the World Online accepted the following species:

- Daphne acutiloba Rehder
- Daphne alpina L.
- Daphne altaica Pall.
- Daphne angustiloba Rehder
- Daphne arbuscula Čelak.
- Daphne arisanensis Hayata
- Daphne aurantiaca Diels
- Daphne axillaris (Merr. & Chun) Chun & C.F.Wei
- Daphne axilliflora (Keissl.) Pobed.
- Daphne baksanica Pobed.
- Daphne bholua Buch.-Ham. ex D.Don
- Daphne blagayana Freyer
- Daphne brevituba H.F.Zhou ex C.Y.Chang
- Daphne caucasica Pall.
- Daphne championii Benth.
- Daphne chingshuishaniana S.S.Ying
- Daphne cneorum L.
- Daphne depauperata H.F.Zhou ex C.Y.Chang
- Daphne domini Halda
- Daphne emeiensis C.Y.Chang
- Daphne erosiloba C.Y.Chang
- Daphne esquirolii H.Lév.
- Daphne feddei H.Lév.
- Daphne gemmata E.Pritz.
- Daphne genkwa Siebold & Zucc.
- Daphne giraldii Nitsche
- Daphne glomerata Lam.
- Daphne gnidioides Jaub. & Spach
- Daphne gnidium L.
- Daphne gracilis E.Pritz.
- Daphne grueningiana H.J.P.Winkl.
- Daphne hekouensis H.W.Li & Y.M.Shui
- Daphne holosericea (Diels) Hamaya
- Daphne jarmilae Halda
- Daphne jasminea Sm.
- Daphne jejudoensis M.Kim
- Daphne jezoensis Maxim.
- Daphne jinyunensis C.Yung Chang
- Daphne jinzhaiensis D.C.Zhang & J.Z.Shao
- Daphne kamtschatica Maxim.
- Daphne kingdon-wardii Halda
- Daphne kiusiana Miq.
- Daphne kosaninii (Stoj.) Stoj.
- Daphne kurdica (Bornm.) Bornm.
- Daphne laciniata Lecomte
- Daphne laureola L.
- Daphne leishanensis H.F.Zhou ex C.Y.Chang
- Daphne limprichtii H.J.P.Winkl.
- Daphne longilobata (Lecomte) Turrill
- Daphne longituba C.Yung Chang
- Daphne ludlowii D.G.Long & Rae
- Daphne luzonica C.B.Rob.
- Daphne macrantha Ludlow
- Daphne malyana Blečić
- Daphne mezereum L.
- Daphne miyabeana Makino
- Daphne modesta Rehder
- Daphne morrisonensis C.E.Chang
- Daphne mucronata Royle
- Daphne myrtilloides Nitsche
- Daphne nana Tagawa
- Daphne odora Thunb.
- Daphne ogisui C.D.Brickell, B.Mathew & Yin Z.Wang
- Daphne oleoides Schreb.
- Daphne pachyphylla D.Fang
- Daphne papyracea Wall. ex G.Don
- Daphne pedunculata H.F.Zhou ex C.Y.Chang
- Daphne penicillata Rehder
- Daphne petraea Leyb.
- Daphne pontica L.
- Daphne pseudomezereum A.Gray
- Daphne pseudosericea Pobed.
- Daphne purpurascens S.C.Huang
- Daphne retusa Hemsl.
- Daphne rhynchocarpa C.Y.Chang
- Daphne rodriguezii Texidor
- Daphne rosmarinifolia Rehder
- Daphne sericea Vahl
- Daphne sojakii Halda
- Daphne sophia Kolenicz.
- Daphne souliei (Lecomte) Aymonin
- Daphne stapfii Bornm. & Keissl.
- Daphne striata Tratt.
- Daphne sureil W.W.Sm. & Cave
- Daphne tangutica Maxim.
- Daphne taurica Kotov
- Daphne taylorii Halda
- Daphne tenuiflora Bureau & Franch.
- Daphne thanguensis J.Ghosh, Midday, S.K.Dey & D.Maity
- Daphne transcaucasica Pobed.
- Daphne tripartita H.F.Zhou ex C.Y.Chang
- Daphne velenovskyi Halda
- Daphne wangiana (Hamaya) Halda
- Daphne wolongensis C.D.Brickell & B.Mathew
- Daphne xichouensis H.F.Zhou ex C.Y.Chang
- Daphne yangtoushanensis S.S.Ying
- Daphne yunnanensis H.F.Zhou ex C.Y.Chang

=== Hybrids ===
Hybrids accepted by Plants of the World Online are:

- Daphne × hauseri Halda
- Daphne × hendersonii Hodgkin ex C.D.Brickell & B.Mathew – natural hybrid D. petraea × D. cneorum
- Daphne × houtteana Lindl. & Paxton
- Daphne × juraseki Halda
- Daphne × neapolitana (Lindl.) Loudon
- Daphne × rossetii H.Correvon & Halda
- Daphne × savensis Daksk., Seliškar & Vreš
- Daphne × sillingeri Halda
- Daphne × thauma Farrer – natural hybrid D. petraea × D. striata

Numerous artificial hybrids are cultivated as ornamental plants. These include:

- D. × burkwoodii – D. cneorum × D. caucasica
- D. × napolitana Lodd. has gained the Royal Horticultural Society's Award of Garden Merit – origin not known
- D. × susannae C.D.Brickell – artificial hybrid D. arbuscula × D. sericea (syn. D. collina); the correct name may be D. × medfordensis Halda
- D. × schlyteri – artificial hybrid D. cneorum × D. arbuscula

== Distribution ==
Daphne is a Eurasian genus, being native to central and southern Europe and Asia, from Britain to Japan. Some species are also found in north Africa. A number of species have been introduced into other areas for cultivation, with two, D. mezereum and D. laureola, having become naturalised in North America.

== Uses ==
Two species, Daphne bholua and Daphne papyracea, both called lokta, are harvested in Nepal and Bhutan for paper production.

Many species are cultivated as ornamental shrubs in gardens. The smaller species are used as rock garden plants or, in the case of those more difficult to grow, as plants for the alpine house. It is recommended that they are grown in well drained but moisture-retentive soil, avoiding strongly acid conditions. Most species prefer a sunny position, although some are woodland plants (e.g. D. mezereum and D. pontica). Propagation is by seed, cuttings or layering.

=== Award of garden merit ===
The following species, hybrids and cultivars are recipients of the Royal Horticultural Society's Award of Garden Merit:

- Daphne arbuscula
- Daphne bholua 'Jacqueline Postill'
- Daphne bholua var. glacialis 'Gurkha'
- Daphne × burkwoodii 'Somerset'
- Daphne cneorum 'Eximia'
- Daphne × rollsdorfii 'Wilhelm Schacht'
- Daphne tangutica Retusa Group
- Daphne × transatlantica Eternal Fragrance = 'Blafra' PBR

== Toxicity ==
All parts of daphnes are toxic, the berries being particularly so. One active compound is daphnin, a glycoside, combining glucose with daphnetin. Some species have been shown to contain a further toxin, mezerein. Symptoms of ingestion include burning sensations and lesions of the mouth and upper digestive tract, gastroenteritis and diarrhoea, and in severe cases, damage to the kidneys (nephritis), irregular heart rhythm, and coma.

== Allergenicity ==
Daphnes have an OPALS allergy scale rating of 5 out of 10, indicating moderate potential to cause allergic reactions, exacerbated by over-use of the same plant throughout a garden. The sap and berry juice can cause dermatitis and the scent may affect the odor-sensitive.

== Gallery ==
Variation in flower and fruit colour

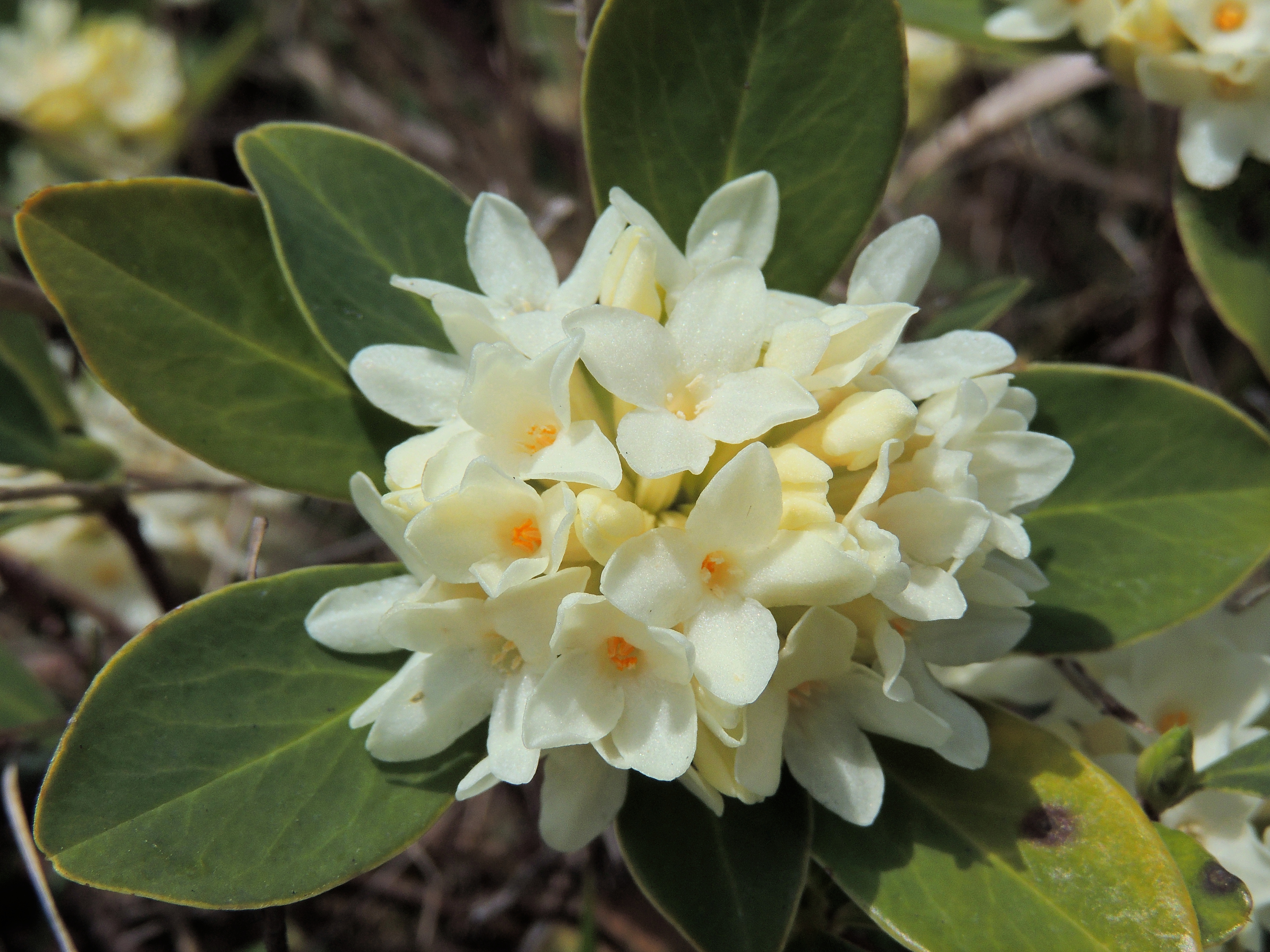
Daphne blagayana

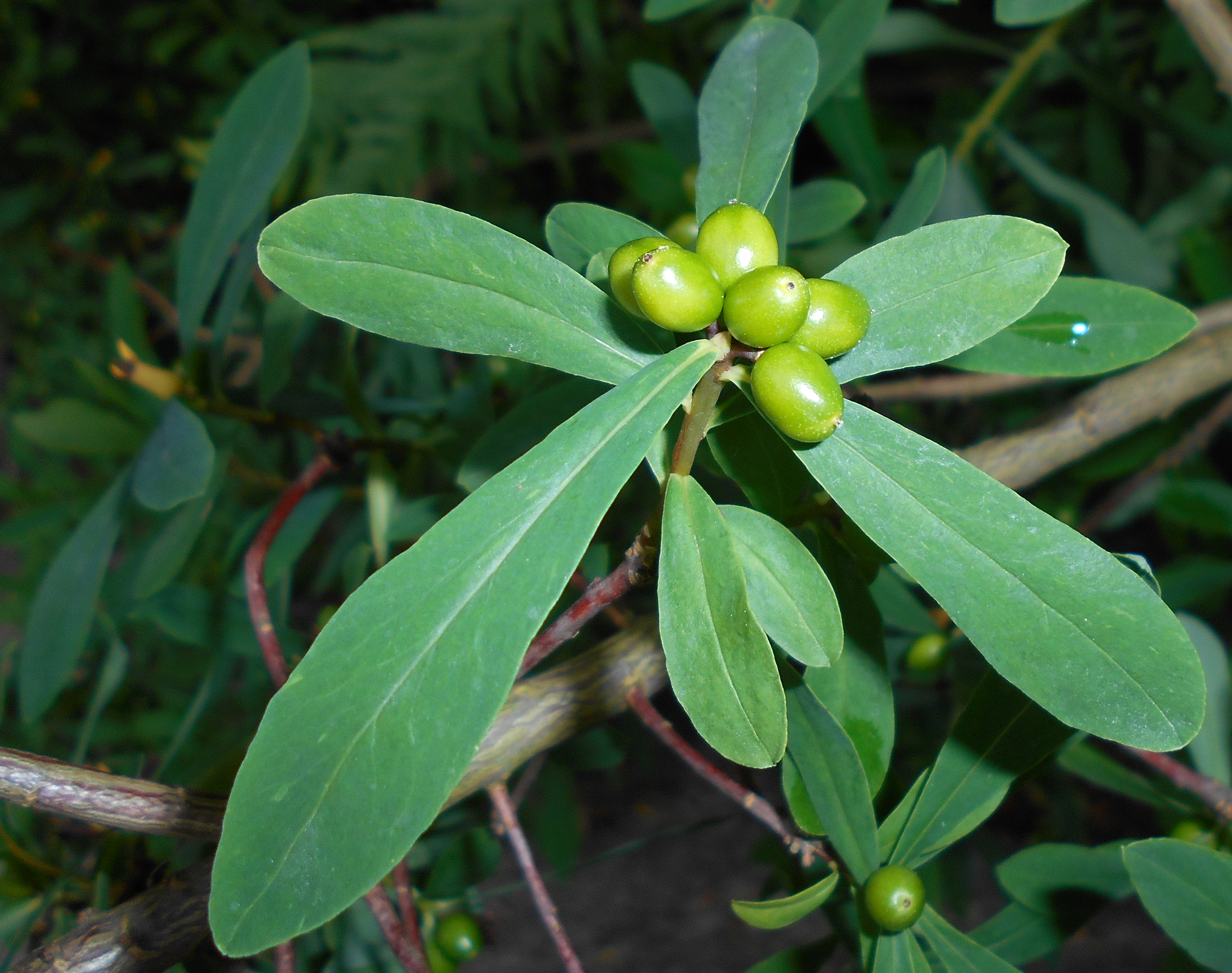
Daphne giraldii – unripe fruit

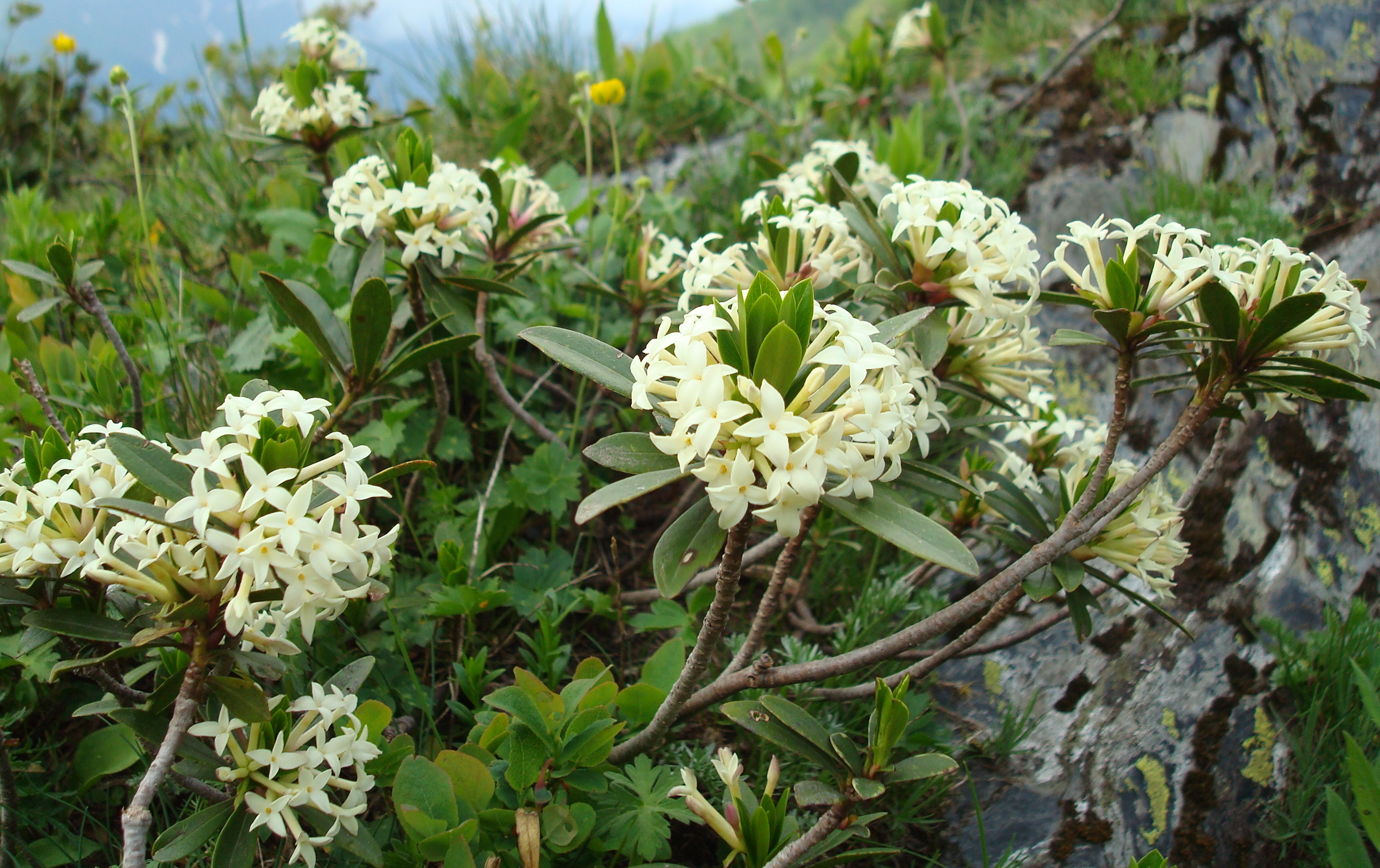
Daphne glomerata

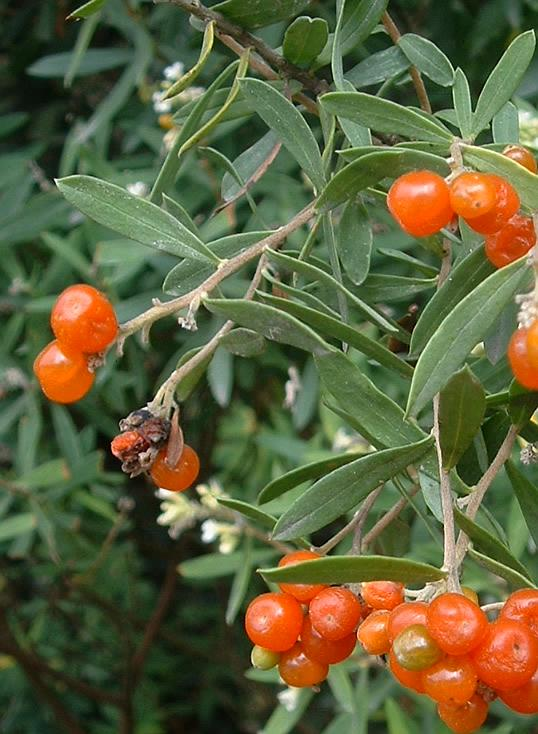
Daphne gnidium – ripe fruit

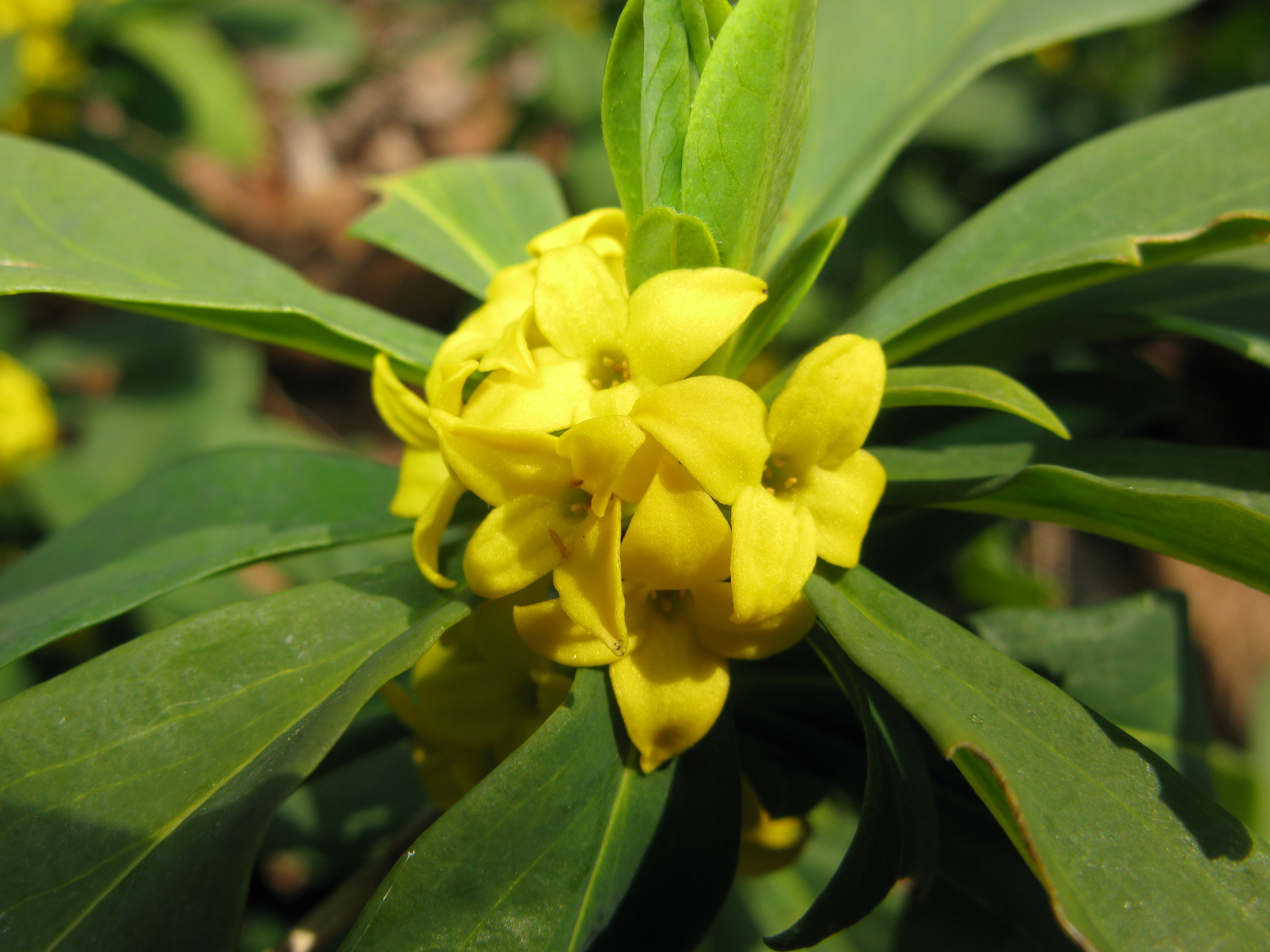
Daphne jezoensis

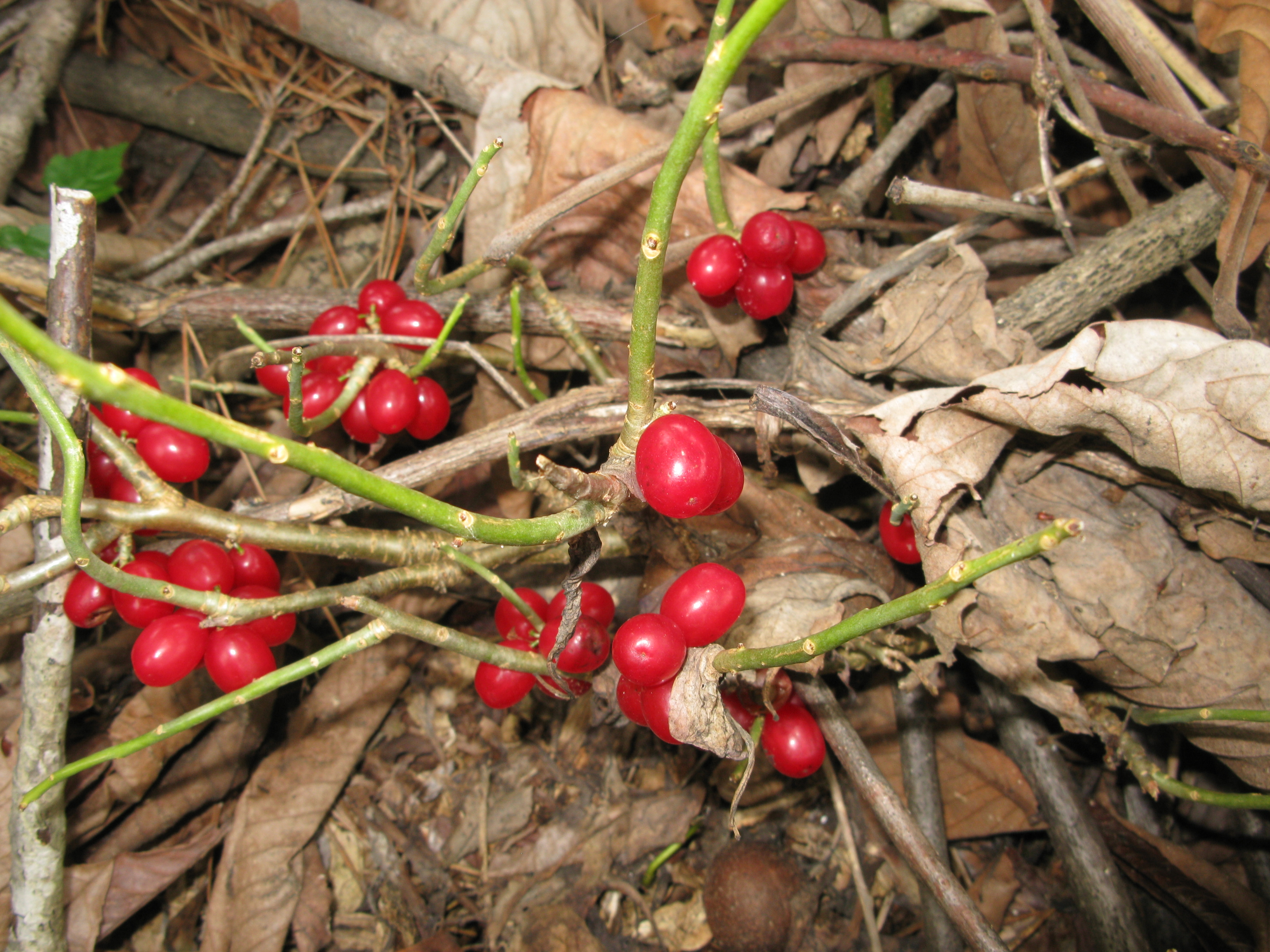
Daphne jezoensis – ripe fruit

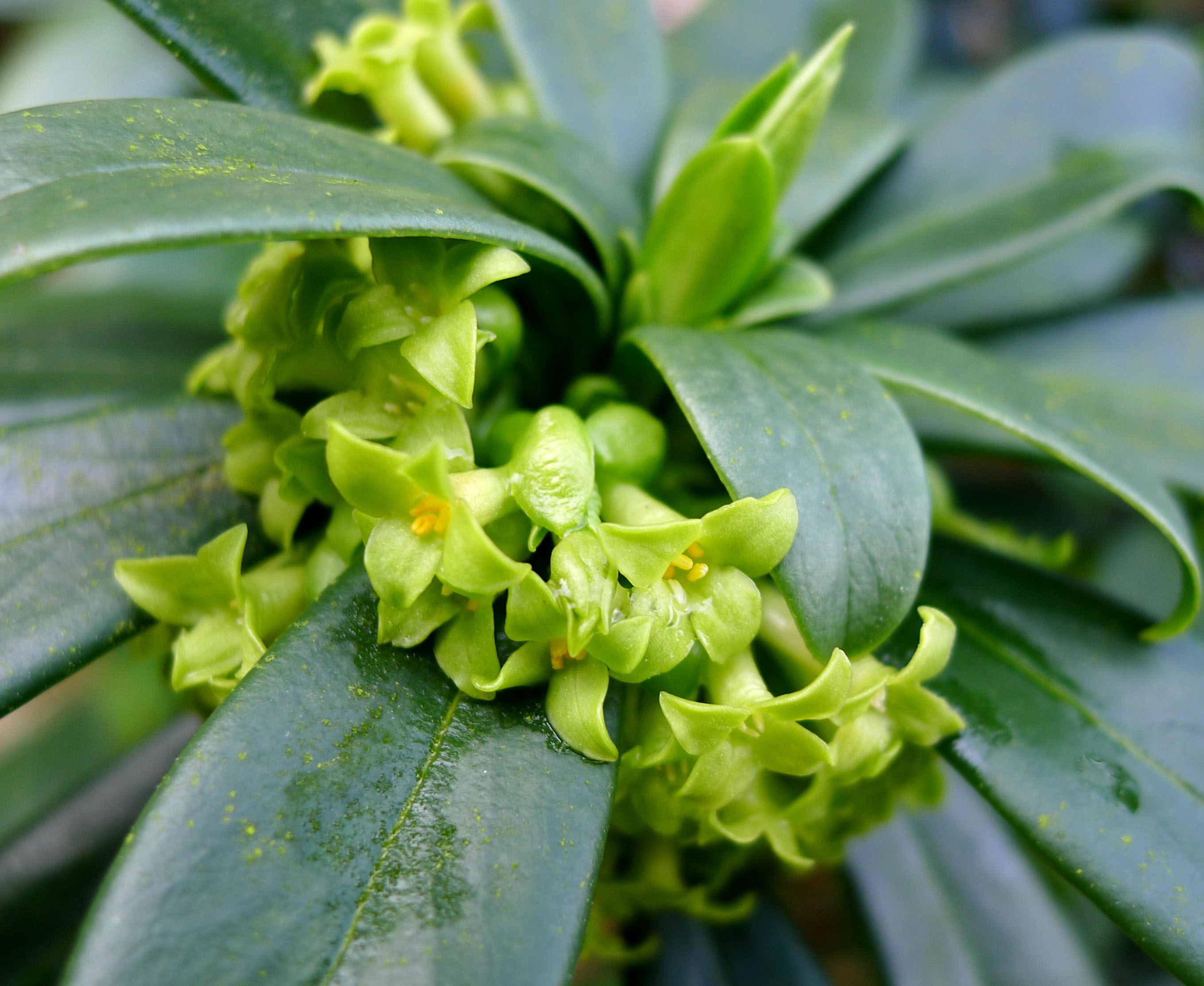
Daphne laureola

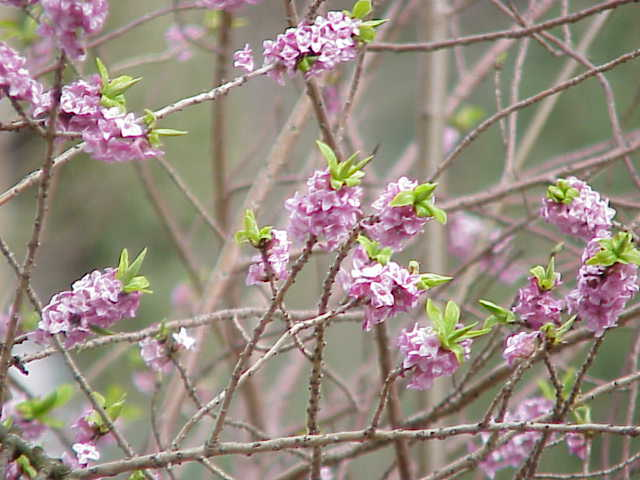
Daphne mezereum – deciduous

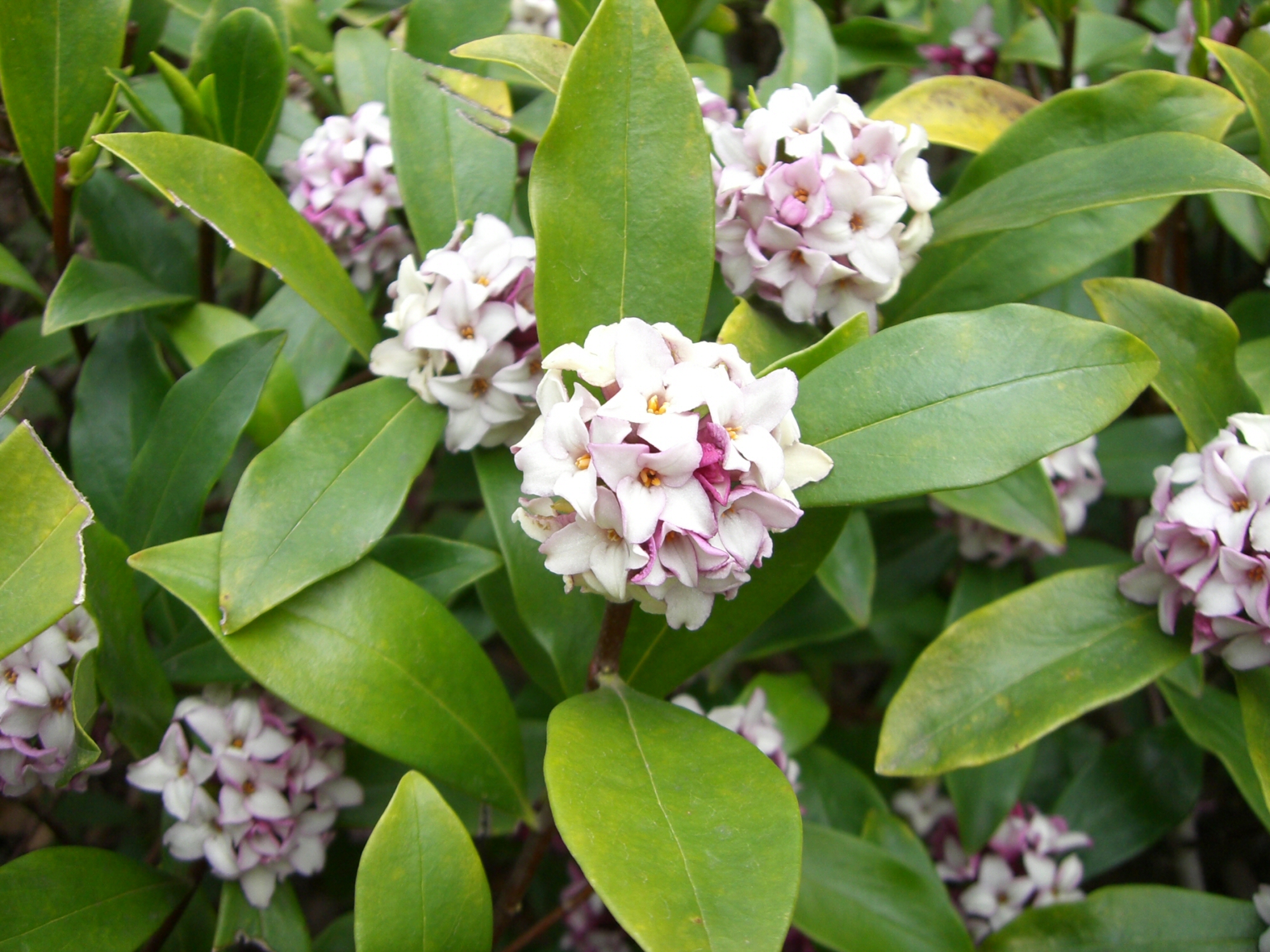
Daphne odora

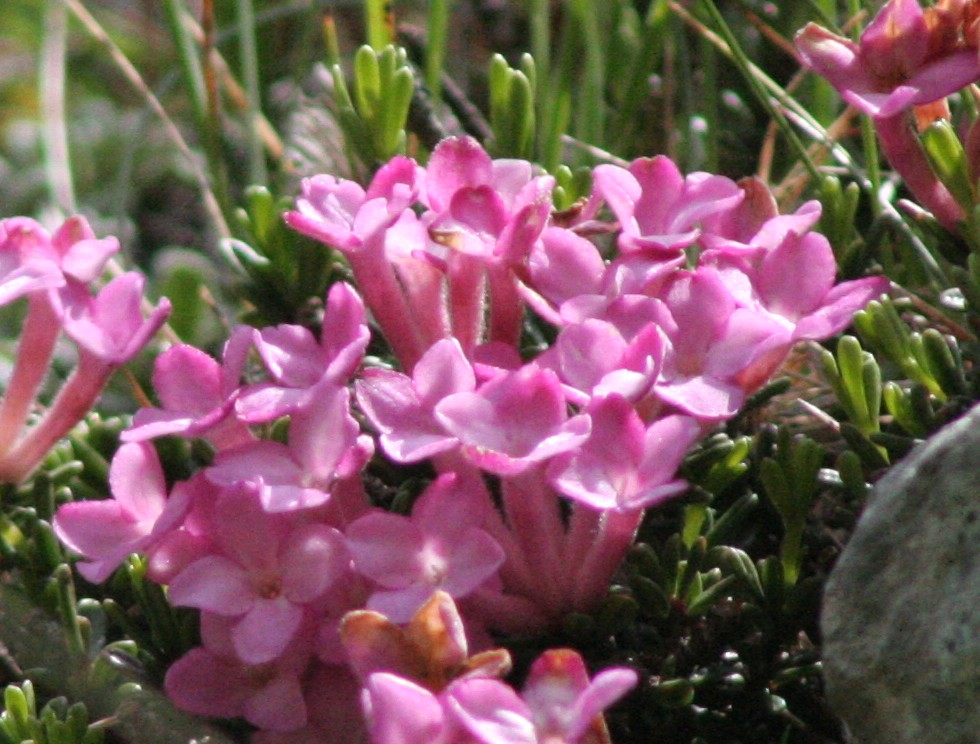
Daphne petraea

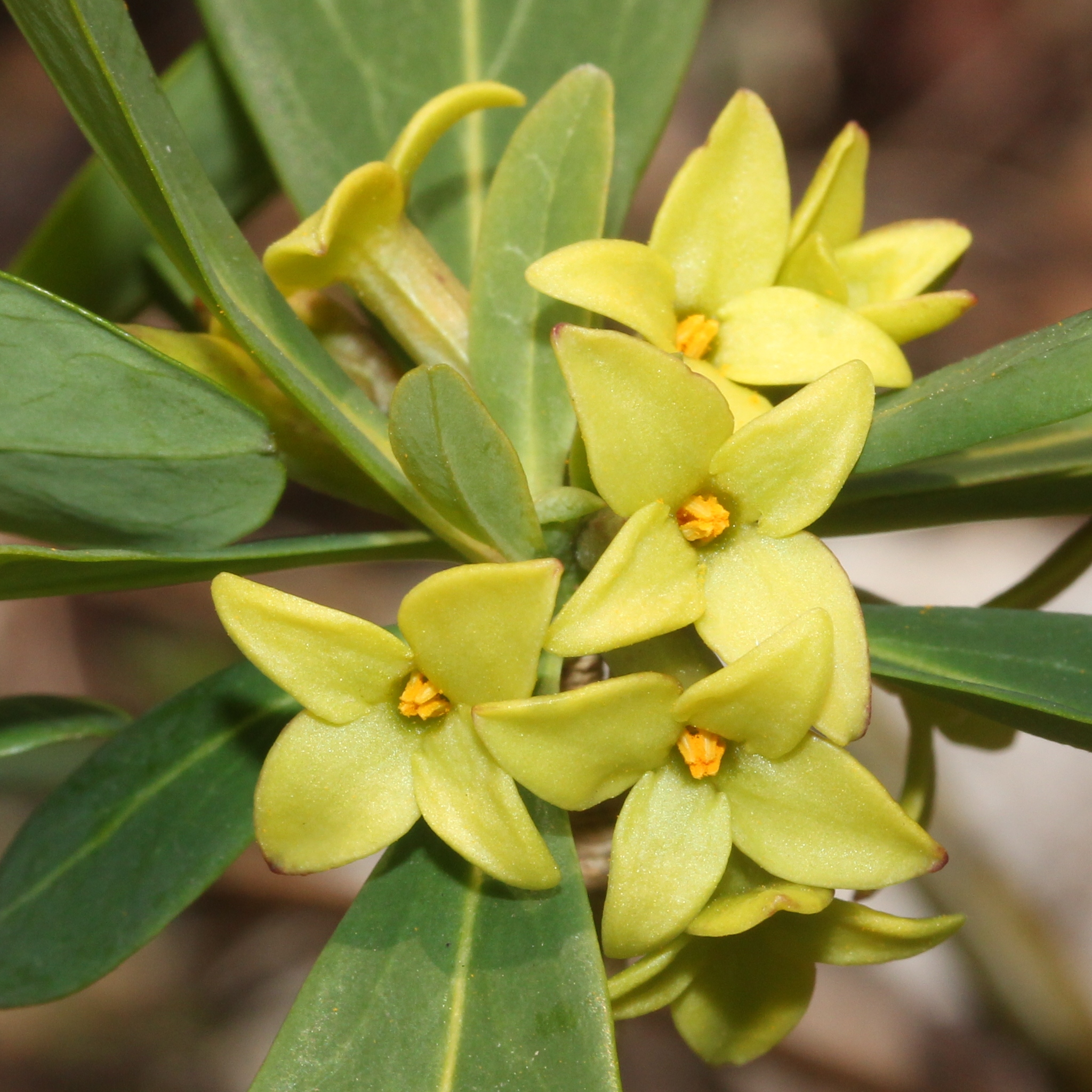
Daphne pseudomezereum

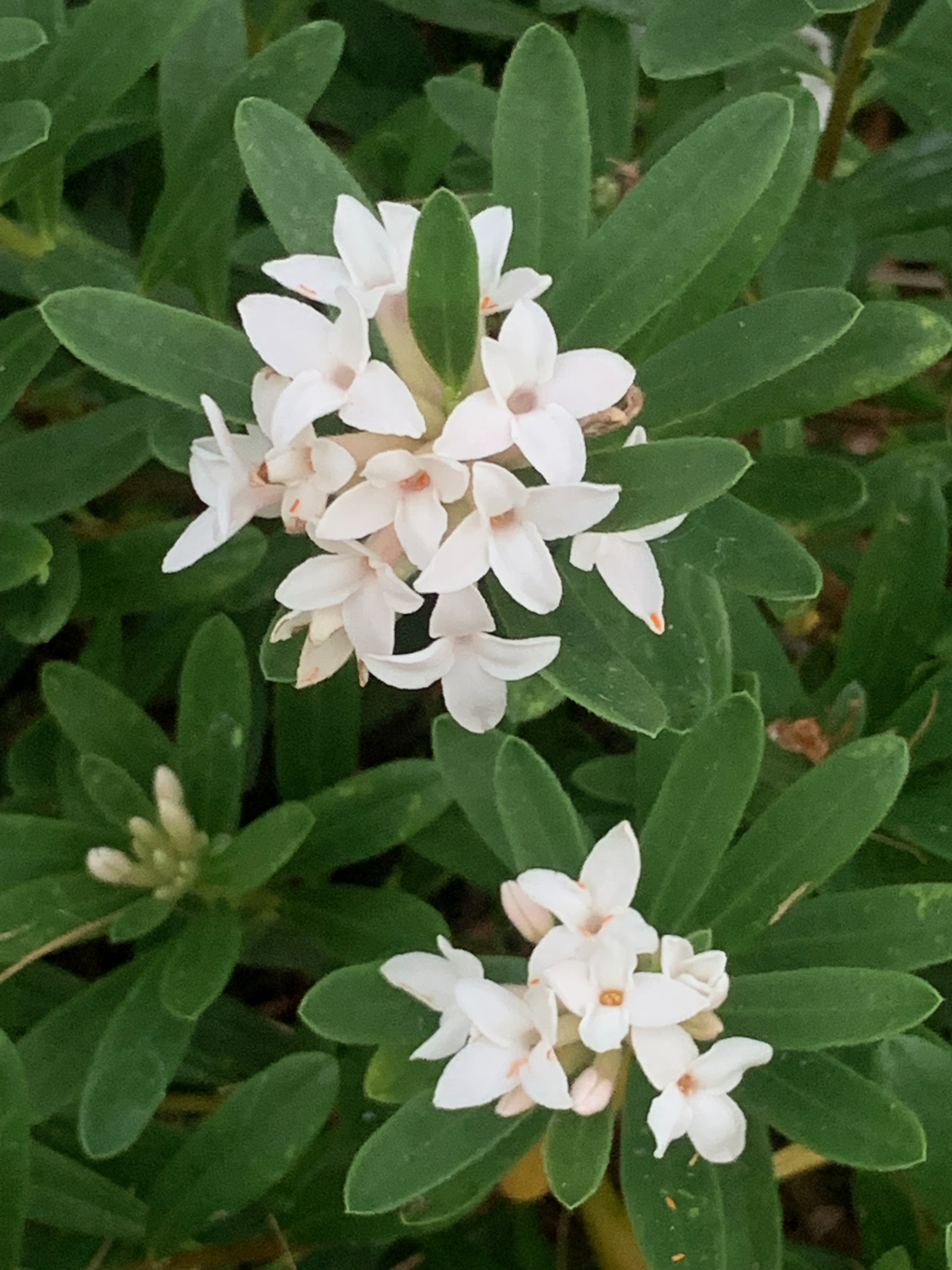
Daphne × transatlantica Eternal Fragrance = 'Blafra'

== Bibliography ==
- Brickell, C.D. & Mathew, B. (1976), Daphne: The Genus in the Wild and in Cultivation, Woking: The Alpine Garden Society, OCLC 832501497
- Halda, Josef J. & Haldová, Jarmila (2001), The Genus Daphne, Dobré: SEN, ISBN 978-80-86483-00-9
- White, Robin (2006), Daphnes: A Practical Guide for Gardeners, Portland, UK: Timber Press, ISBN 978-0-88192-752-8
