= Daphne kurdica =

Scientific classification
- Kingdom: Plantae
- Clade: Tracheophytes
- Clade: Angiosperms
- Clade: Eudicots
- Clade: Rosids
- Order: Malvales
- Family: Thymelaeaceae
- Genus: Daphne
- Species: D. kurdica

Binomial name
- Daphne kurdica (Bornm.) Bornm.

Synonyms
- Daphne oleoides var. kurdica Bornm.; Daphne oleoides subsp. kurdica (Bornm.) Bornm.

Species of plant

Daphne kurdica is a species of flowering plant in the family Thymelaeaceae, native to Iran and Turkey. It was first described by Josheph Bornmüller in 1909 as Daphne oleoides var. kurdica. Bornmüller later raised in to a subspecies and then in 1916 to a full species.
