= Daphne yunnanensis =

Scientific classification
- Kingdom: Plantae
- Clade: Tracheophytes
- Clade: Angiosperms
- Clade: Eudicots
- Clade: Rosids
- Order: Malvales
- Family: Thymelaeaceae
- Genus: Daphne
- Species: D. yunnanensis

Binomial name
- Daphne yunnanensis H.F.Zhou ex C.Y.Chang

Synonyms
- Daphne papyracea subsp. yunnanensis (H.F.Zhou ex C.Y.Chang) Halda

Species of plant

Daphne yunnanensis is a species of flowering plant in the family Thymelaeaceae, native to China (southwest Yunnan). It was first described in 1985.

Daphne yunnanensis is distinguished from Daphne papyracea by the shape of its leaves which usually have tips that are pointed to heart-shaped (acuminate-caudate) and the shape of the disk which is almost divided into four parts, having two bifid lobes. It occurs in montane forests.
