= Daphne brevituba =

Scientific classification
- Kingdom: Plantae
- Clade: Tracheophytes
- Clade: Angiosperms
- Clade: Eudicots
- Clade: Rosids
- Order: Malvales
- Family: Thymelaeaceae
- Genus: Daphne
- Species: D. brevituba

Binomial name
- Daphne brevituba H.F.Zhou ex C.Y.Chang

Species of shrub

Daphne brevituba is a shrub, of the family Thymelaeaceae. It is endemic to western and central Yunnan in China.

== Description ==
The shrub is evergreen, and grows to 1.0 meters tall. Its branches are pale-yellow, light brown, and nearly cylindrical in shape. Its leaves alternate, and are usually clustered at apices of branches.

It is often found in valley woodland areas at around 2,000 meters in altitude. It flowers from March to April and bears fruit from April to May.
