= Daphne sureil =

Scientific classification
- Kingdom: Plantae
- Clade: Tracheophytes
- Clade: Angiosperms
- Clade: Eudicots
- Clade: Rosids
- Order: Malvales
- Family: Thymelaeaceae
- Genus: Daphne
- Species: D. sureil

Binomial name
- Daphne sureil W.W.Sm. & Cave.

Species of shrub

Daphne sureil is a shrub, of the family Thymelaeaceae. It is native to China, specifically Xizang, and other regions in close proximity, including Bangladesh and Bhutan.

== Description ==
The shrub is evergreen, and grows up to 2.5 m tall. Its grayish brown branches are arranged in an ascending fashion. It is often found in tropical cloud forests at an altitude of 1800 to 2800 m.
