= Daphne penicillata =

Scientific classification
- Kingdom: Plantae
- Clade: Tracheophytes
- Clade: Angiosperms
- Clade: Eudicots
- Clade: Rosids
- Order: Malvales
- Family: Thymelaeaceae
- Genus: Daphne
- Species: D. penicillata

Binomial name
- Daphne penicillata Rehder

Species of shrub

Daphne penicillata is a shrub, of the family Thymelaeaceae. It is native to China, specifically Sichuan.

== Description ==
The shrub's yellowish or grayish brown branches grow densely. It is often found on arid slopes and in forests at altitudes of 1200 to 1700 m.
