= Daphne jinyunensis =

Scientific classification
- Kingdom: Plantae
- Clade: Tracheophytes
- Clade: Angiosperms
- Clade: Eudicots
- Clade: Rosids
- Order: Malvales
- Family: Thymelaeaceae
- Genus: Daphne
- Species: D. jinyunensis

Binomial name
- Daphne jinyunensis C.Y.Chang

Synonyms
- Daphne papyracea subsp. jinyunensis (C.Yung Chang) Halda

Species of plant

Daphne jinyunensis is a species of flowering plant in the family Thymelaeaceae, native to China (Chongqing). It was first described in 1985.

Daphne jinyunensis has dark, very finely hairy branches, inflorescences with few flowers and very small bracteoles. Its flowers are 6–8 mm long and 3–4 mm across. It is found in open forests on rocky slopes.
