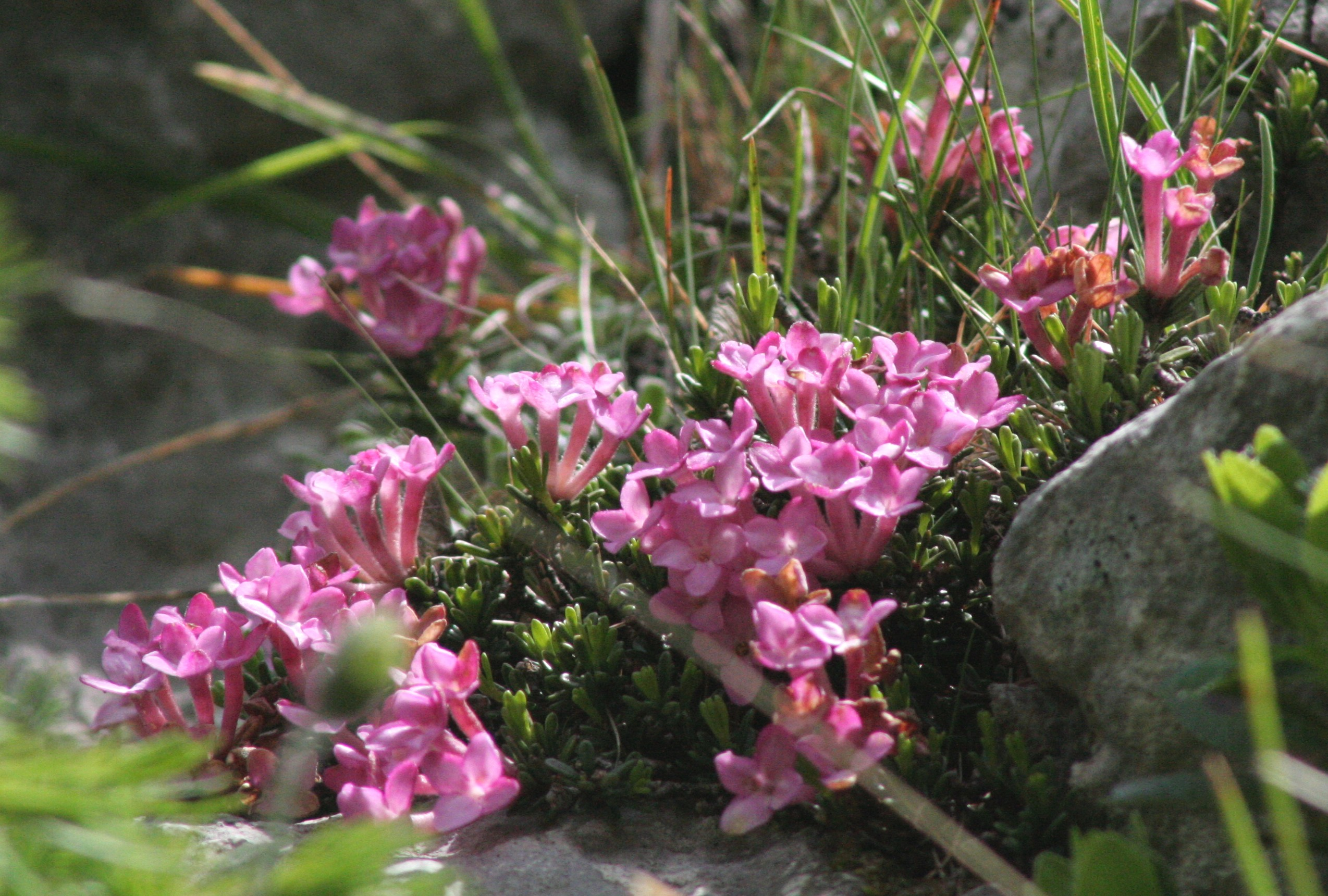

Scientific classification
- Kingdom: Plantae
- Clade: Tracheophytes
- Clade: Angiosperms
- Clade: Eudicots
- Clade: Rosids
- Order: Malvales
- Family: Thymelaeaceae
- Genus: Daphne
- Species: D. petraea

Binomial name
- Daphne petraea Leyb.

= Daphne petraea =

Species of shrub

Daphne petraea is a shrub, of the family Thymelaeaceae. It is endemic to Italy.

== Description ==
The shrub may grow either with a prostrate or an erect habit. It grows to a height of 15 cm. It also has pink or red flowers which grow to be 9 to 15 mm long and 6 to 10 mm wide.
