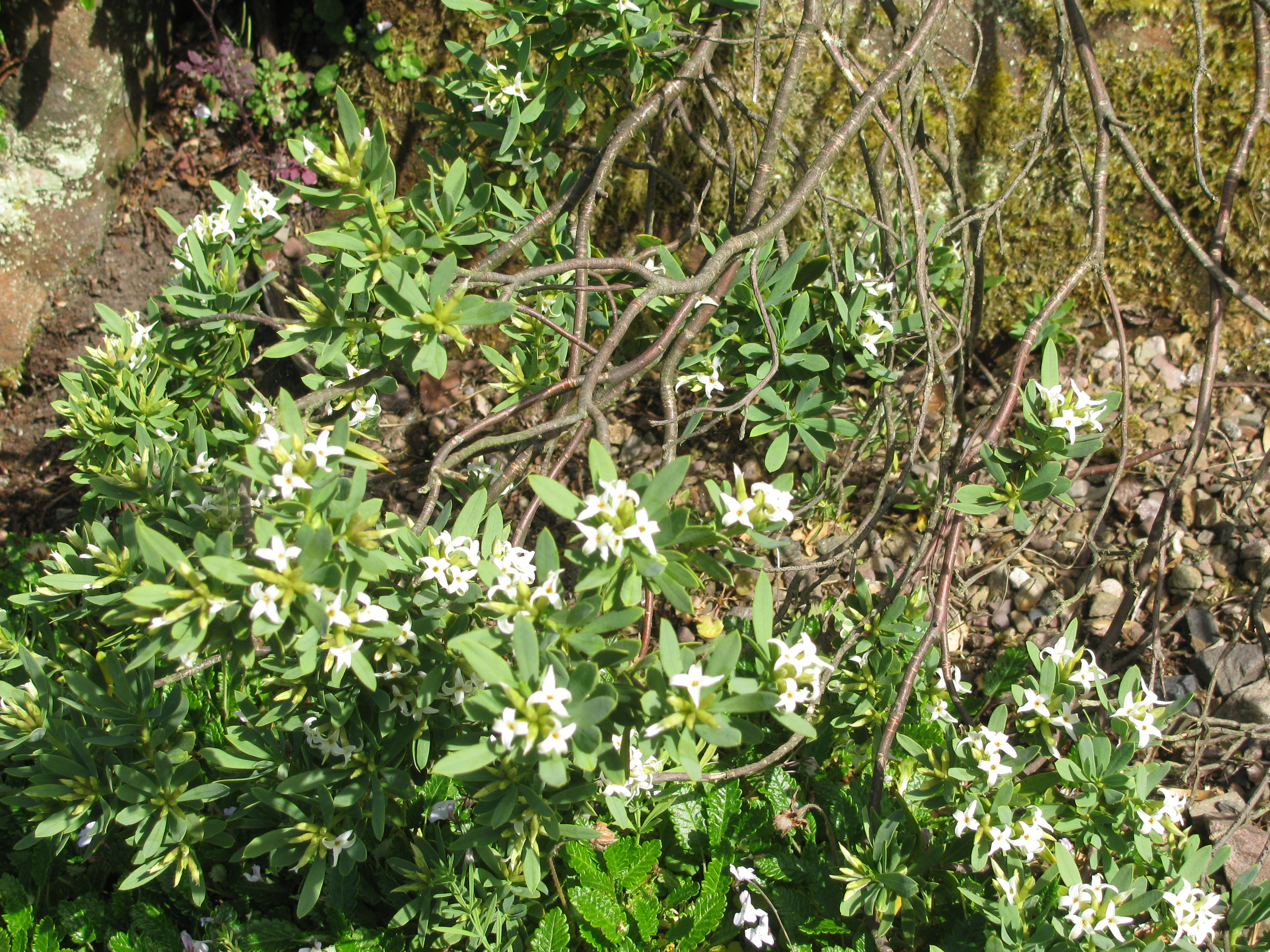

Scientific classification
- Kingdom: Plantae
- Clade: Tracheophytes
- Clade: Angiosperms
- Clade: Eudicots
- Clade: Rosids
- Order: Malvales
- Family: Thymelaeaceae
- Genus: Daphne
- Species: D. gnidioides

Binomial name
- Daphne gnidioides Jaub. & Spach

= Daphne gnidioides =

Species of shrub

Daphne gnidioides is a shrub, of the family Thymelaeaceae. It is found in the northeastern Mediterranean.

== Description ==
The shrub grows to a height of 0.5 to 3.5 m. Its leaves range from 0.4 to 0.7 cm wide and 2.5 to 4.0 cm long. Its flowers are white, and grow in groups of 5 to 8. It grows at altitudes ranging from 5 to 150 m, and flowers from September to November.
