= Daphne laciniata =

Scientific classification
- Kingdom: Plantae
- Clade: Tracheophytes
- Clade: Angiosperms
- Clade: Eudicots
- Clade: Rosids
- Order: Malvales
- Family: Thymelaeaceae
- Genus: Daphne
- Species: D. laciniata

Binomial name
- Daphne laciniata Lecomte

Species of plant

Daphne laciniata is a species of flowering plant in the family Thymelaeaceae, native to China (Yunnan). It was first described by Paul Henri Lecomte in 1916.

Daphne laciniata is an evergreen shrub, and grows from 0.8 to 1.5 m tall. It is often found in forests at an altitude between 1,000 and 1,500 meters.
