= Daphne pseudosericea =

Scientific classification
- Kingdom: Plantae
- Clade: Tracheophytes
- Clade: Angiosperms
- Clade: Eudicots
- Clade: Rosids
- Order: Malvales
- Family: Thymelaeaceae
- Genus: Daphne
- Species: D. pseudosericea

Binomial name
- Daphne pseudosericea Pobed.

Synonyms
- Daphne circassica Woronow ex Pobed.; Daphne sericea subsp. circassica (Woronow ex Pobed.) Halda; Daphne sericea subsp. pseudosericea (Pobed.) Halda; Daphne woronowii Kolak.

Species of plant

Daphne pseudosericea is a species of flowering plant in the family Thymelaeaceae, native to the North Caucasus and the Transcaucasus. It was first described by Yevgenia Pobedimova in 1950.
