= Daphne longituba =

Scientific classification
- Kingdom: Plantae
- Clade: Tracheophytes
- Clade: Angiosperms
- Clade: Eudicots
- Clade: Rosids
- Order: Malvales
- Family: Thymelaeaceae
- Genus: Daphne
- Species: D. longituba

Binomial name
- Daphne longituba C.Y.Chang

Synonyms
- Daphne papyracea var. longituba (C.Yung Chang) Halda

Species of plant

Daphne longituba is a species of flowering plant in the family Thymelaeaceae, native to China (northeast Guangxi). It was first described in 1985.

Daphne longituba differs from Daphne papyracea in the length of the flowers, which are 10–14 mm long. It is found in forests and valleys at 1,000–1,200 m.
