= Daphne taylorii =

Scientific classification
- Kingdom: Plantae
- Clade: Tracheophytes
- Clade: Angiosperms
- Clade: Eudicots
- Clade: Rosids
- Order: Malvales
- Family: Thymelaeaceae
- Genus: Daphne
- Species: D. taylorii

Binomial name
- Daphne taylorii Halda

Species of plant

Daphne taylorii is a species of flowering plant in the family Thymelaeaceae, endemic to southeast Tibet. It was first described by Josef Halda in 2000.

== Description ==
Daphne taylorii is a short shrub, usually growing to about 30 to 50 cm high, occasionally up to 1 m. It has reddish brown branches that are densely covered with hairs. The leaves are alternate and have a short petiole. The leathery leaf blades are dark glossy green on the upper surfaces, dull pale green on the lower surfaces, and are about 2.5 to 5.5 cm long by 0.9 to 2.2 cm wide. The flowers are borne in terminal inflorescences with two to five flowers, occasionally eight. Like all Daphne species, the flowers are without petals. They are formed from four sepals fused at the base to form a tube 7 to 12 long, purplish on the outside with two white lobes and white on the inside. The eight stamens are arranged in two whorls. The fruit is a red drupe, ovoid in shape and 8 to 10 mm long.

== Distribution and habitat ==
Daphne taylorii is endemic to southeast Tibet. It is found in deep shade at the base of cliffs at altitudes of around 3,500 m.
