= Daphne feddei =

Scientific classification
- Kingdom: Plantae
- Clade: Tracheophytes
- Clade: Angiosperms
- Clade: Eudicots
- Clade: Rosids
- Order: Malvales
- Family: Thymelaeaceae
- Genus: Daphne
- Species: D. feddei

Binomial name
- Daphne feddei H.Lév.

Species of shrub

Daphne feddei is a shrub, of the family Thymelaeaceae. It is native to China, specifically Sichuan, Guizhou, and Yunnan.

== Description ==
The shrub is evergreen, and grows from 0.6 to 2.0 meters tall. Its pale yellowish green branches are sparse. It bears white flowers and red fruits. It is often found in forests and shrubby slopes at around 1800–2600 meters in altitude.
