= Daphne macrantha =

Scientific classification
- Kingdom: Plantae
- Clade: Tracheophytes
- Clade: Angiosperms
- Clade: Eudicots
- Clade: Rosids
- Order: Malvales
- Family: Thymelaeaceae
- Genus: Daphne
- Species: D. macrantha

Binomial name
- Daphne macrantha Ludlow

Species of shrub

Daphne macrantha is a shrub, of the family Thymelaeaceae. It is native to China, specifically northeastern Xizang.

== Description ==
The shrub is evergreen, and grows up to 30 cm tall. Its branches creep and are purplish red or brown. It is often found among rocks on north-facing open hillsides at 4200–4300 m in altitude.
