= Daphne leishanensis =

Scientific classification
- Kingdom: Plantae
- Clade: Tracheophytes
- Clade: Angiosperms
- Clade: Eudicots
- Clade: Rosids
- Order: Malvales
- Family: Thymelaeaceae
- Genus: Daphne
- Species: D. leishanensis

Binomial name
- Daphne leishanensis H.F.Zhou ex C.Y.Chang

Synonyms
- Daphne genkwa subsp. leishanensis (H.F.Zhou ex C.Y.Chang) Halda

Species of plant

Daphne leishanensis is a species of flowering plant in the family Thymelaeaceae, native to South-Central China (Guizhou). It was first described in 1985.

Daphne leishanensis differs from Daphne genkwa by having blackish-purple older branches and reddish flowers 6–7 mm long. It grows on rocky slopes with bushes at altitudes ranging from 900 to 1,200 m.
