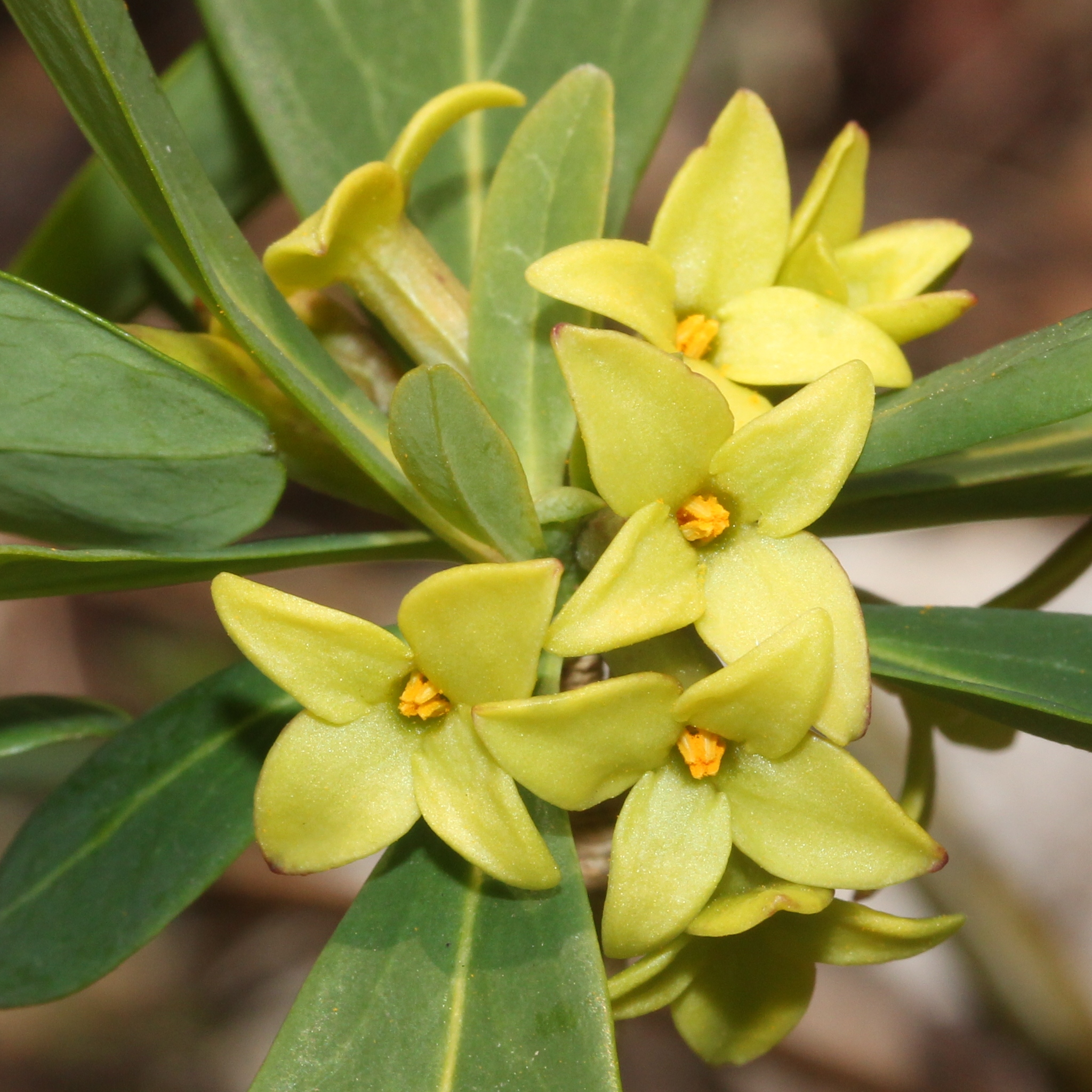

Scientific classification
- Kingdom: Plantae
- Clade: Tracheophytes
- Clade: Angiosperms
- Clade: Eudicots
- Clade: Rosids
- Order: Malvales
- Family: Thymelaeaceae
- Genus: Daphne
- Species: D. pseudomezereum

Binomial name
- Daphne pseudomezereum A.Gray

= Daphne pseudomezereum =

Species of shrub

Daphne pseudomezereum is a shrub, of the family Thymelaeaceae. It is native to Japan, specifically Honshu, and Korea.

== Description ==
The shrub is wintergreen, and grows to about 1 m tall. It flowers green in March and April and is deciduous in the summer. Some variants found in Korea are deciduous in the winter instead.
