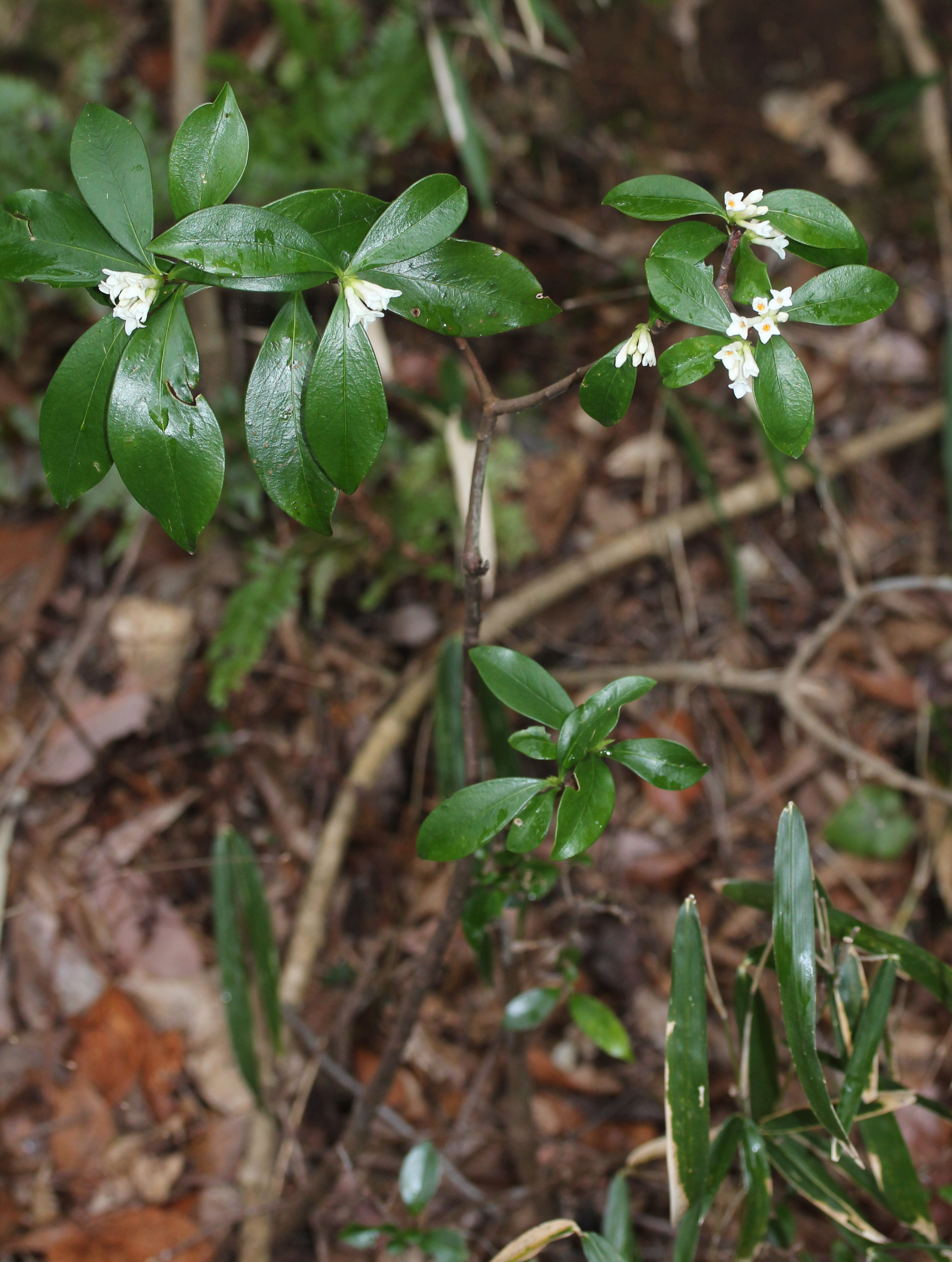

Scientific classification
- Kingdom: Plantae
- Clade: Tracheophytes
- Clade: Angiosperms
- Clade: Eudicots
- Clade: Rosids
- Order: Malvales
- Family: Thymelaeaceae
- Genus: Daphne
- Species: D. kiusiana

Binomial name
- Daphne kiusiana Miq.

= Daphne kiusiana =

Species of shrub

Daphne kiusiana is a shrub of the family Thymelaeaceae. It is native to East Asia.

== Distribution ==
Daphne kiusiana occurs in East Asia:

- Daphne kiusiana var. kiusiana: Japan, South Korea
- Daphne kiusiana var. atrocaulis: Taiwan, southern and eastern China (Anhui, Fujian, Guangdong, Guangxi, Hubei, Hunan, Jiangsu, Jiangxi, Sichuan, Zhejiang)

== Description ==
The shrub is evergreen, and grows from 0.5 to 2.0 meters tall. Its branches are dark purplish red or brown. In China, it is found in forests and moist places at an altitude of 300 to 400 meters.

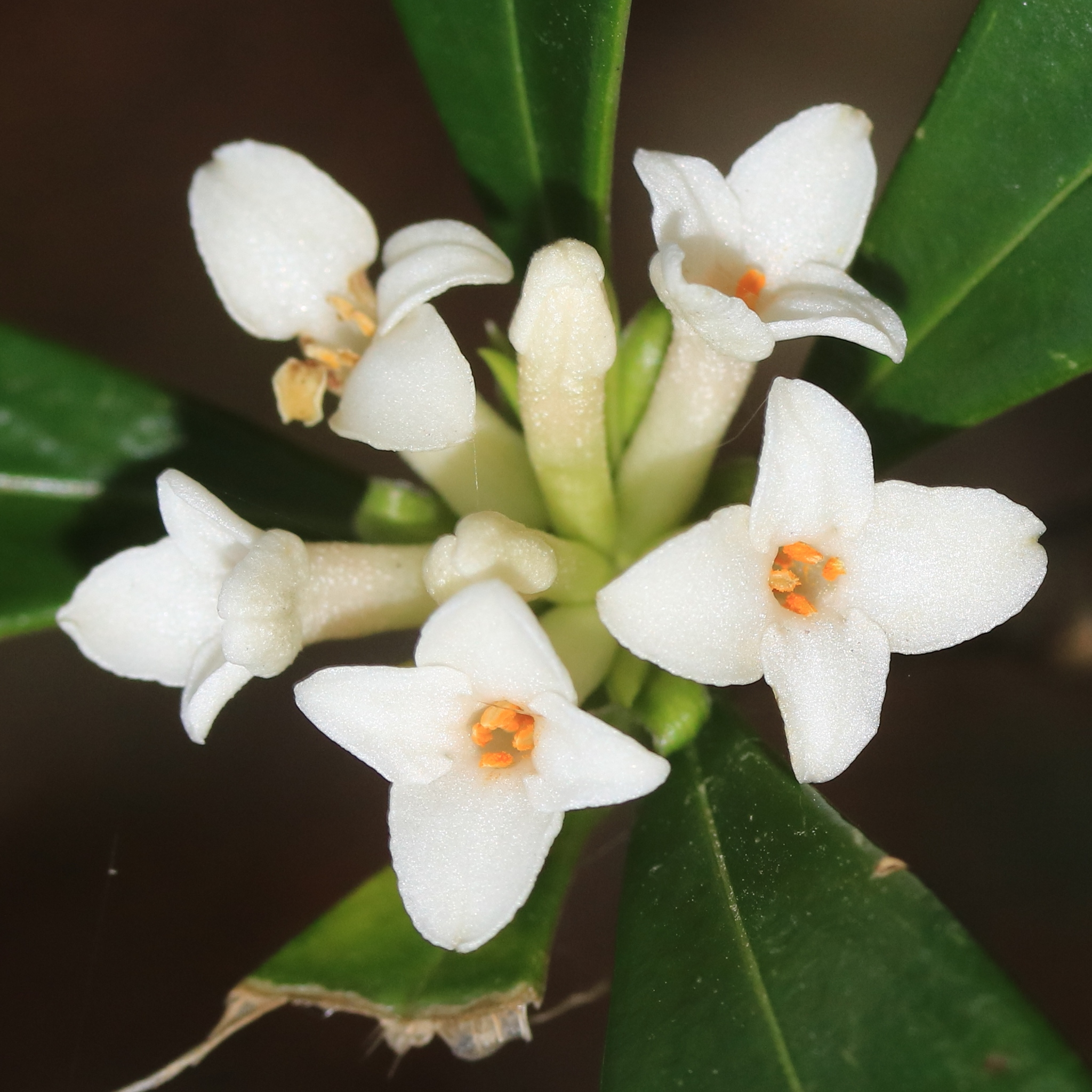
flower

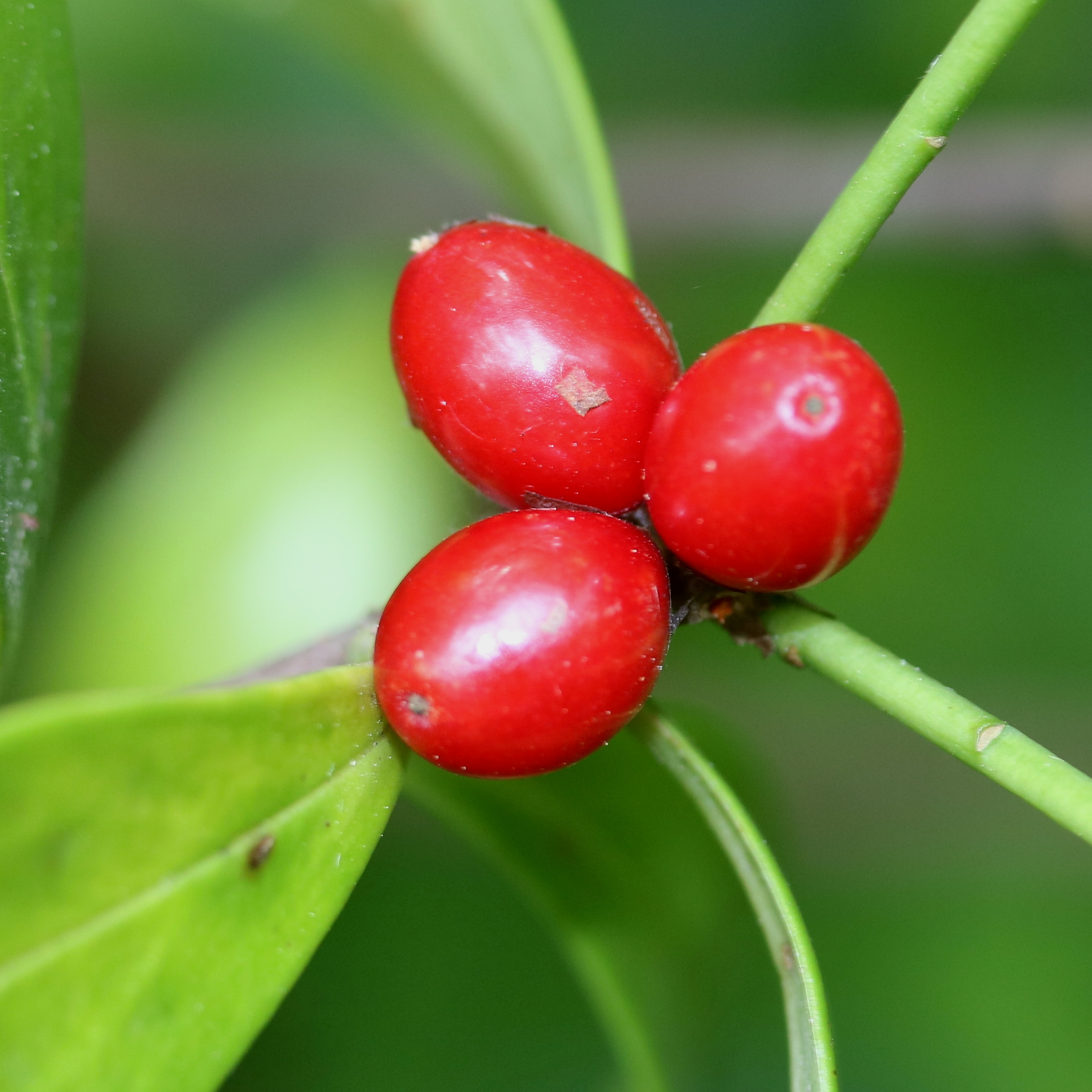
fruits

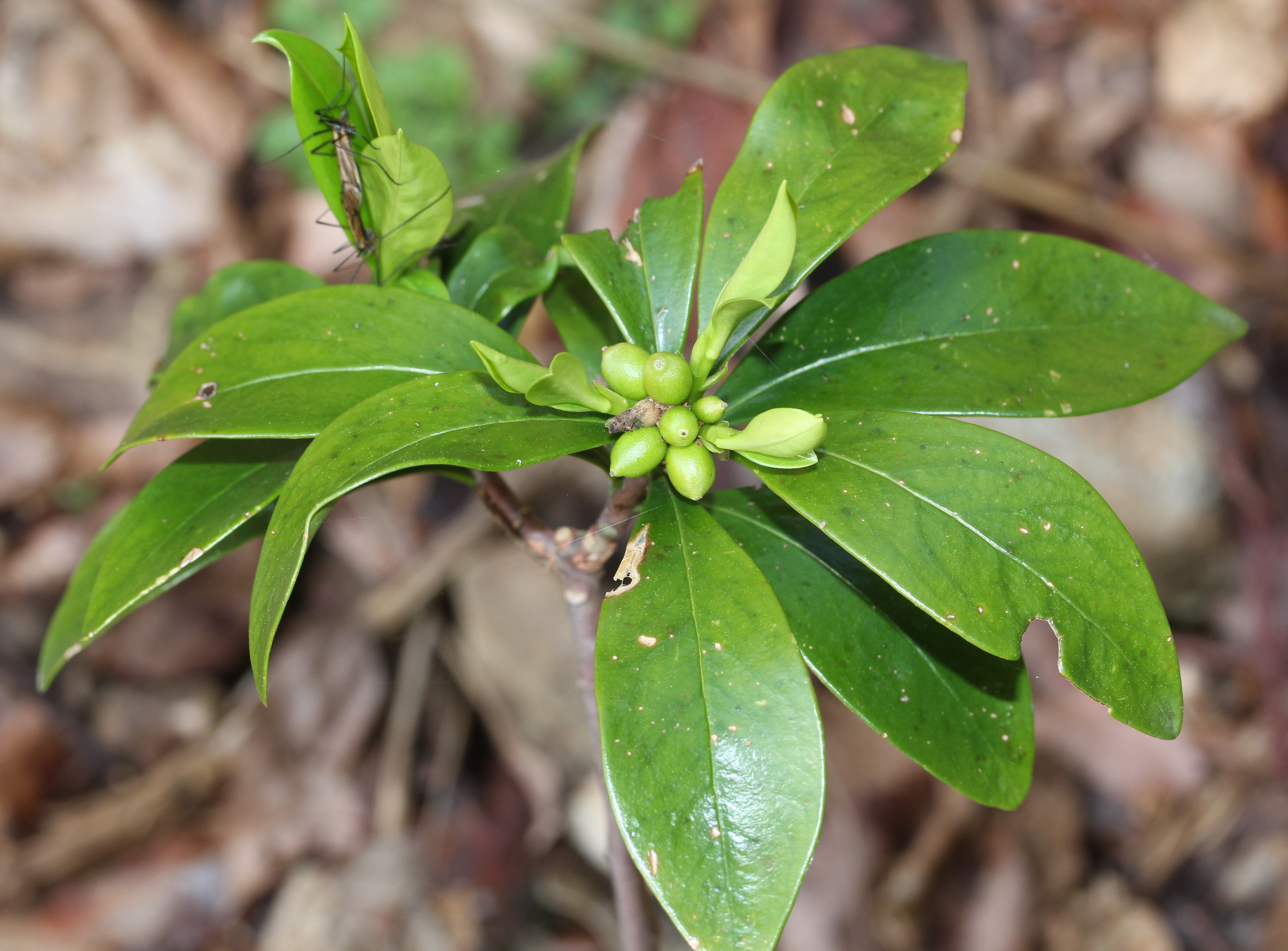
leaves
