= Daphne grueningiana =

Scientific classification
- Kingdom: Plantae
- Clade: Tracheophytes
- Clade: Angiosperms
- Clade: Eudicots
- Clade: Rosids
- Order: Malvales
- Family: Thymelaeaceae
- Genus: Daphne
- Species: D. grueningiana

Binomial name
- Daphne grueningiana H.J.P.Winkl.

Species of shrub

Daphne grueningiana is a shrub, of the family Thymelaeaceae. It is native to China, specifically Anhui and Zhejiang.

== Description ==
The shrub is evergreen, and grows from 0.3 to 1.0 m tall. Its grayish white or brown branches are often found in a dichotomous or whorled fashion and are thin when young. It is often found in valleys and forests at the altitude of 300 to 400 m.
