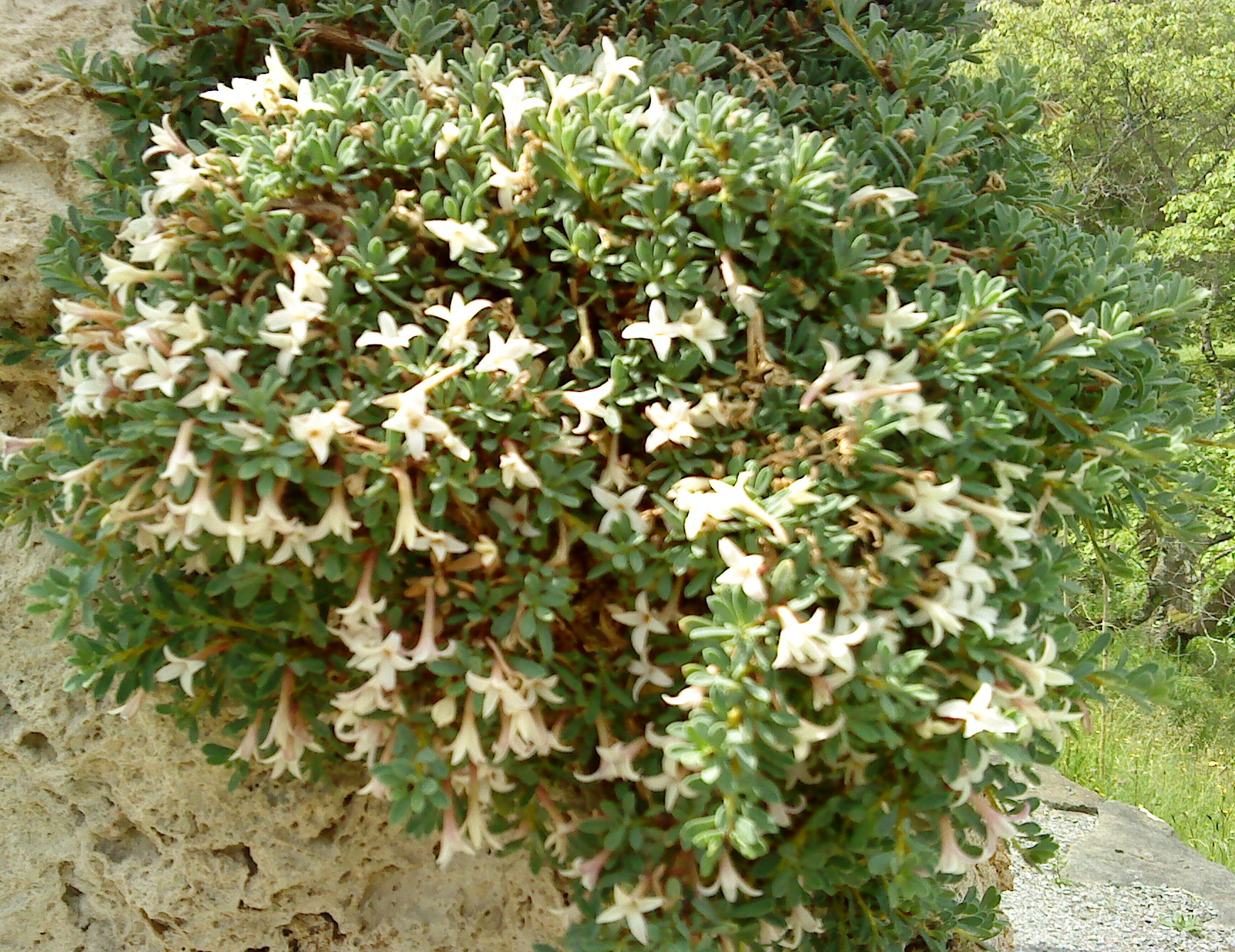

Scientific classification
- Kingdom: Plantae
- Clade: Tracheophytes
- Clade: Angiosperms
- Clade: Eudicots
- Clade: Rosids
- Order: Malvales
- Family: Thymelaeaceae
- Genus: Daphne
- Species: D. jasminea

Binomial name
- Daphne jasminea Sm.

= Daphne jasminea =

Species of shrub

Daphne jasminea is a shrub, of the family Thymelaeaceae. It is native to Greece.

== Description ==
The shrub is evergreen and grows up to 0.2 meters tall. Its flowers are white and pale pink and is often found on limestone rocks.
