= Daphne axillaris =

Scientific classification
- Kingdom: Plantae
- Clade: Tracheophytes
- Clade: Angiosperms
- Clade: Eudicots
- Clade: Rosids
- Order: Malvales
- Family: Thymelaeaceae
- Genus: Daphne
- Species: D. axillaris

Binomial name
- Daphne axillaris Chun & C. F. Wei

Species of shrub

Daphne axillaris is a shrub, of the family Thymelaeaceae. It is endemic to Hainan in China.

== Description ==
The shrub and grows from 2 to 5 meters tall. Its branches are pale yellowish-green, and turn grayish brown when it ages. It is often found in dense forests at around 600–900 meters in altitude.
