= Daphne tripartita =

Scientific classification
- Kingdom: Plantae
- Clade: Tracheophytes
- Clade: Angiosperms
- Clade: Eudicots
- Clade: Rosids
- Order: Malvales
- Family: Thymelaeaceae
- Genus: Daphne
- Species: D. tripartita

Binomial name
- Daphne tripartita H.F.Zhou ex C.Y.Chang

Species of shrub

Daphne tripartita is a shrub of the family Thymelaeaceae. It is native to China, specifically Southwest Sichuan and Northwest Yunnan.

== Description ==
The shrub is evergreen. It has purplish and brownish branches that are smooth and stout. It is often found on boulders in forests at altitudes of 2700 to 3000 m above sea level.
