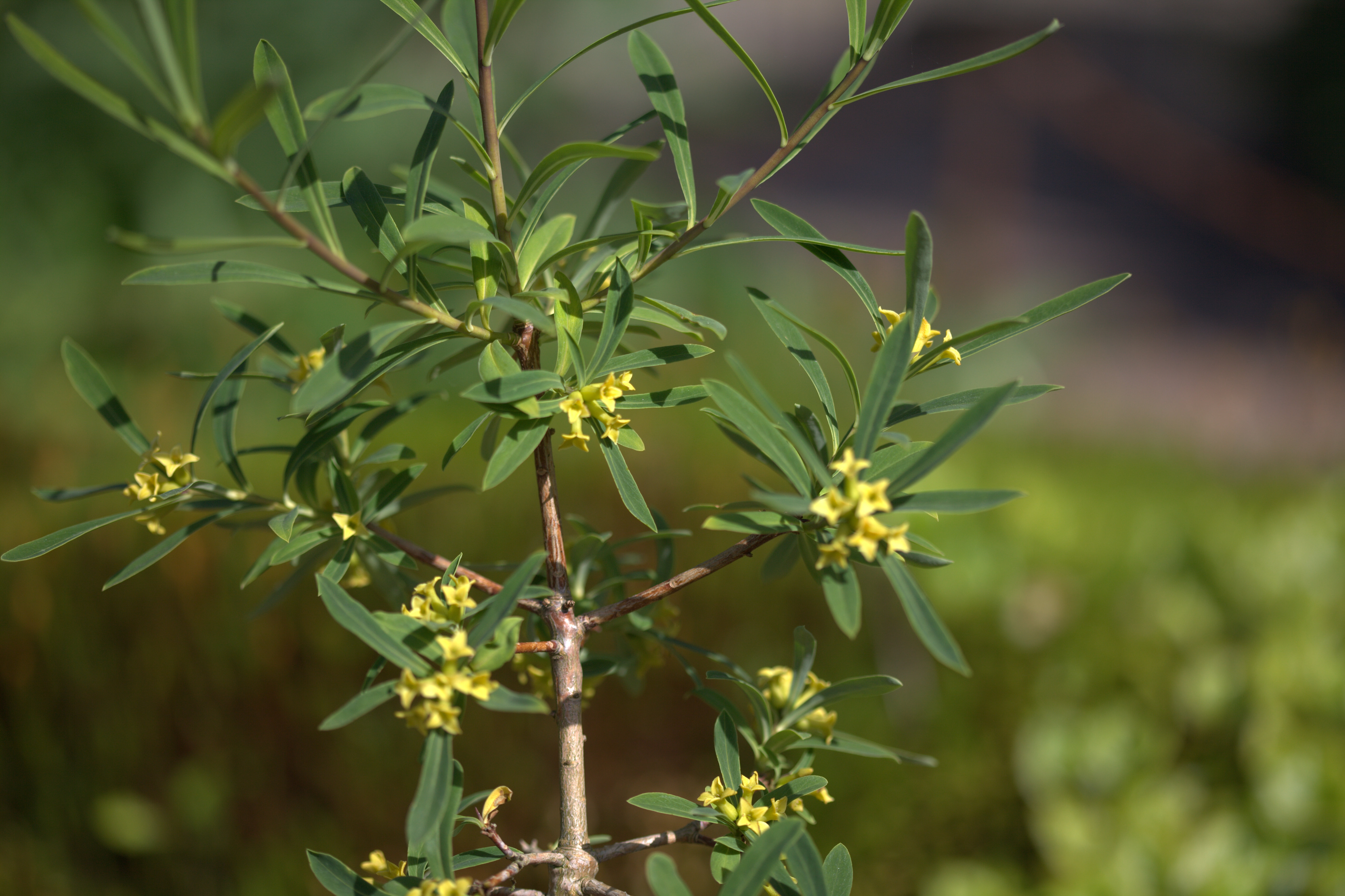

Scientific classification
- Kingdom: Plantae
- Clade: Tracheophytes
- Clade: Angiosperms
- Clade: Eudicots
- Clade: Rosids
- Order: Malvales
- Family: Thymelaeaceae
- Genus: Daphne
- Species: D. giraldii

Binomial name
- Daphne giraldii Nitsche

= Daphne giraldii =

Species of shrub

Daphne giraldii is a shrub, of the family Thymelaeaceae. It is deciduous, and is found in regions of China.

== Description ==
The shrub grows to a height of 0.45 to 0.8 m. Its flowers are golden yellow, and grow in groups of 3 to 8. Its flowers are long, thin, and dark green. It is found on open slopes and forest edges, at altitudes from 1600 to 3100 m.
