= Daphne depauperata =

Scientific classification
- Kingdom: Plantae
- Clade: Tracheophytes
- Clade: Angiosperms
- Clade: Eudicots
- Clade: Rosids
- Order: Malvales
- Family: Thymelaeaceae
- Genus: Daphne
- Species: D. depauperata

Binomial name
- Daphne depauperata H.F.Zhou ex C.Y.Chang

Species of shrub

Daphne depauperata is a shrub, of the family Thymelaeaceae. It is evergreen, and is found in China, specifically western Yunnan.

== Description ==
The shrub grows up to a height of 1.5 m. It grows white flowers in groups of 2 to 5, and red fruit. It grows up to an altitude of 2000 to 3200 m.
