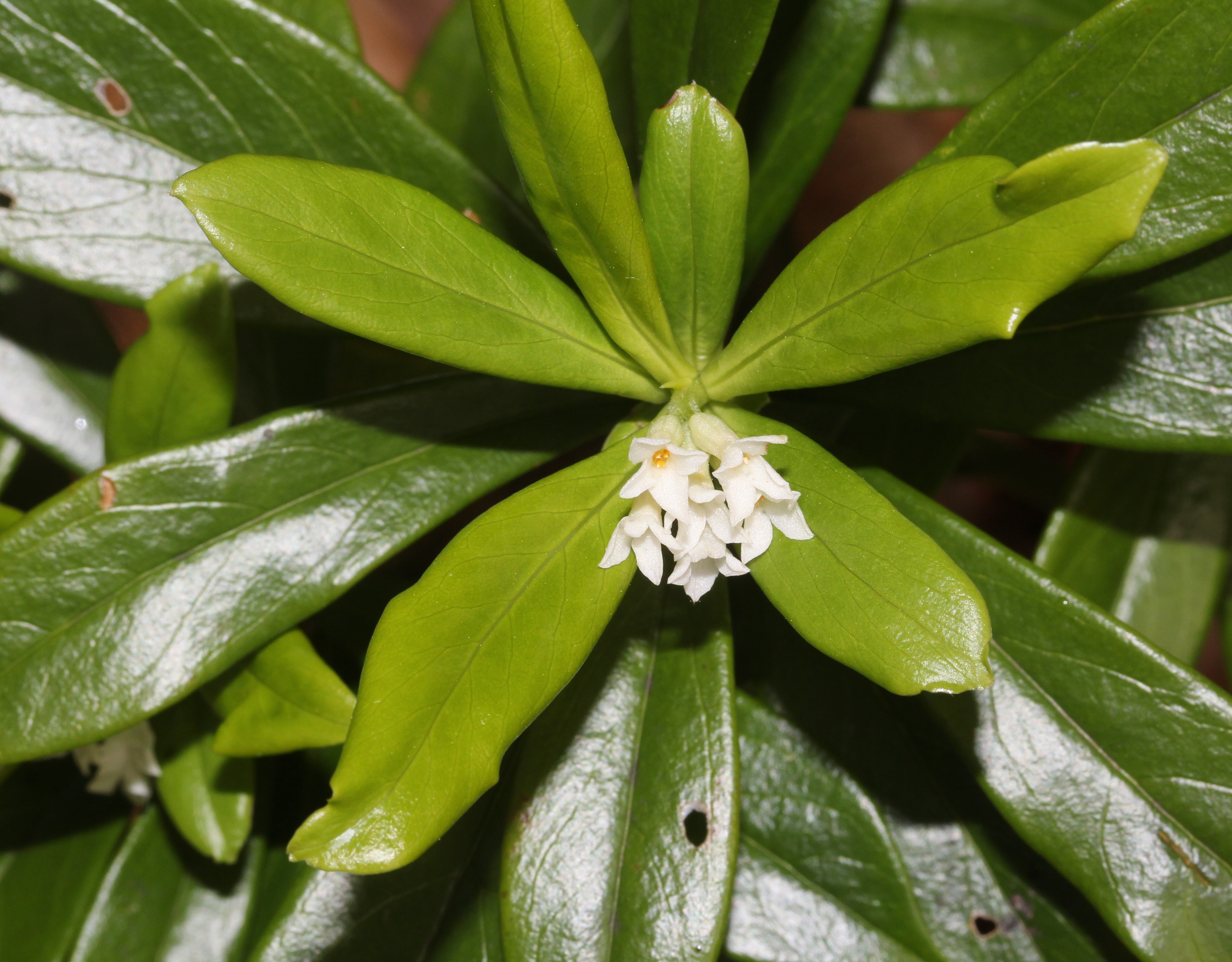

Scientific classification
- Kingdom: Plantae
- Clade: Tracheophytes
- Clade: Angiosperms
- Clade: Eudicots
- Clade: Rosids
- Order: Malvales
- Family: Thymelaeaceae
- Genus: Daphne
- Species: D. miyabeana

Binomial name
- Daphne miyabeana Makino

= Daphne miyabeana =

Species of shrub

Daphne miyabeana is a species of flowering plant in the family Thymelaeaceae. It is a small, rare evergreen shrub found in rocky areas in the high mountains of Hokkaido and Honshu, Japan. Its leaves are 5–10 cm long by 1–2.5 cm wide, glabrous and dark green above, with a short petiole (stalk). The white flowers are arranged in heads at the end of the current year's growth. Like all daphnes, the flowers have no petals, only petal-like sepals. The sepals form a 5–6 mm long tube with spreading lobes. The berries are about 8 mm across and are vermilion when ripe.
