= Daphne nana =

Scientific classification
- Kingdom: Plantae
- Clade: Tracheophytes
- Clade: Angiosperms
- Clade: Eudicots
- Clade: Rosids
- Order: Malvales
- Family: Thymelaeaceae
- Genus: Daphne
- Species: D. nana

Binomial name
- Daphne nana Tagawa

Species of plant

Daphne nana is a species of flowering plant in the family Thymelaeaceae, endemic to east Taiwan (Hualian). It was first described in 1936.

== Description ==
Daphne nana is a short shrub, growing to about 20 cm high. It has hairless (glabrous) brown branches that are more-or-less glossy. The leaves are alternate and have a very short petiole. The papery leaf blades are about 1.5 to 2.5 cm long and 0.7 to at most 1.4 cm wide. The four-lobed flowers are borne in terminal inflorescences with five to eight flowers. In its native habit, the species flowers and fruits in September.
