= Daphne myrtilloides =

Scientific classification
- Kingdom: Plantae
- Clade: Tracheophytes
- Clade: Angiosperms
- Clade: Eudicots
- Clade: Rosids
- Order: Malvales
- Family: Thymelaeaceae
- Genus: Daphne
- Species: D. myrtilloides

Binomial name
- Daphne myrtilloides Nitsche

Species of shrub

Daphne myrtilloides is a shrub, of the family Thymelaeaceae. It is native to China, specifically Gansu, Shaanxi, and Shanxi.

== Description ==
The shrub is deciduous and grows from 10 to 30 cm tall. Its branches are yellowish-green and slender. It is often found in open subalpine forests and stony fields.
