= Daphne pedunculata =

Scientific classification
- Kingdom: Plantae
- Clade: Tracheophytes
- Clade: Angiosperms
- Clade: Eudicots
- Clade: Rosids
- Order: Malvales
- Family: Thymelaeaceae
- Genus: Daphne
- Species: D. pedunculata

Binomial name
- Daphne pedunculata H.F.Zhou ex C.Y.Chang

Synonyms
- Daphne esquirolii subsp. pedunculata (H.F.Zhou ex C.Y.Chang) Halda

Species of plant

Daphne pedunculata is a species of flowering plant in the family Thymelaeaceae, native to China (southeast Yunnan). It was first described in 1985.

== Description ==
Daphne pedunculata is evergreen, and grows to 0.7 m tall. It is often found in dry valleys and sandy shrubby slopes at around 400 m in altitude.
