= Daphne holosericea =

Scientific classification
- Kingdom: Plantae
- Clade: Tracheophytes
- Clade: Angiosperms
- Clade: Eudicots
- Clade: Rosids
- Order: Malvales
- Family: Thymelaeaceae
- Genus: Daphne
- Species: D. holosericea

Binomial name
- Daphne holosericea (Diels) Hamaya

Species of plant

Daphne holosericea is a shrub, of the family Thymelaeaceae. It is native to China, specifically Sichuan and west Yunnan, and Tibet.

== Description ==
The shrub is evergreen, and grows from 0.3 to 1.0 meters tall. Its slender branches are grayish green and its leaves are clustered by the branches. It is often found around other shrubs and herbs in dry valleys at an altitude of 3000 to 3600 meters.
