= Sanchipat =

Assamese bark manuscript

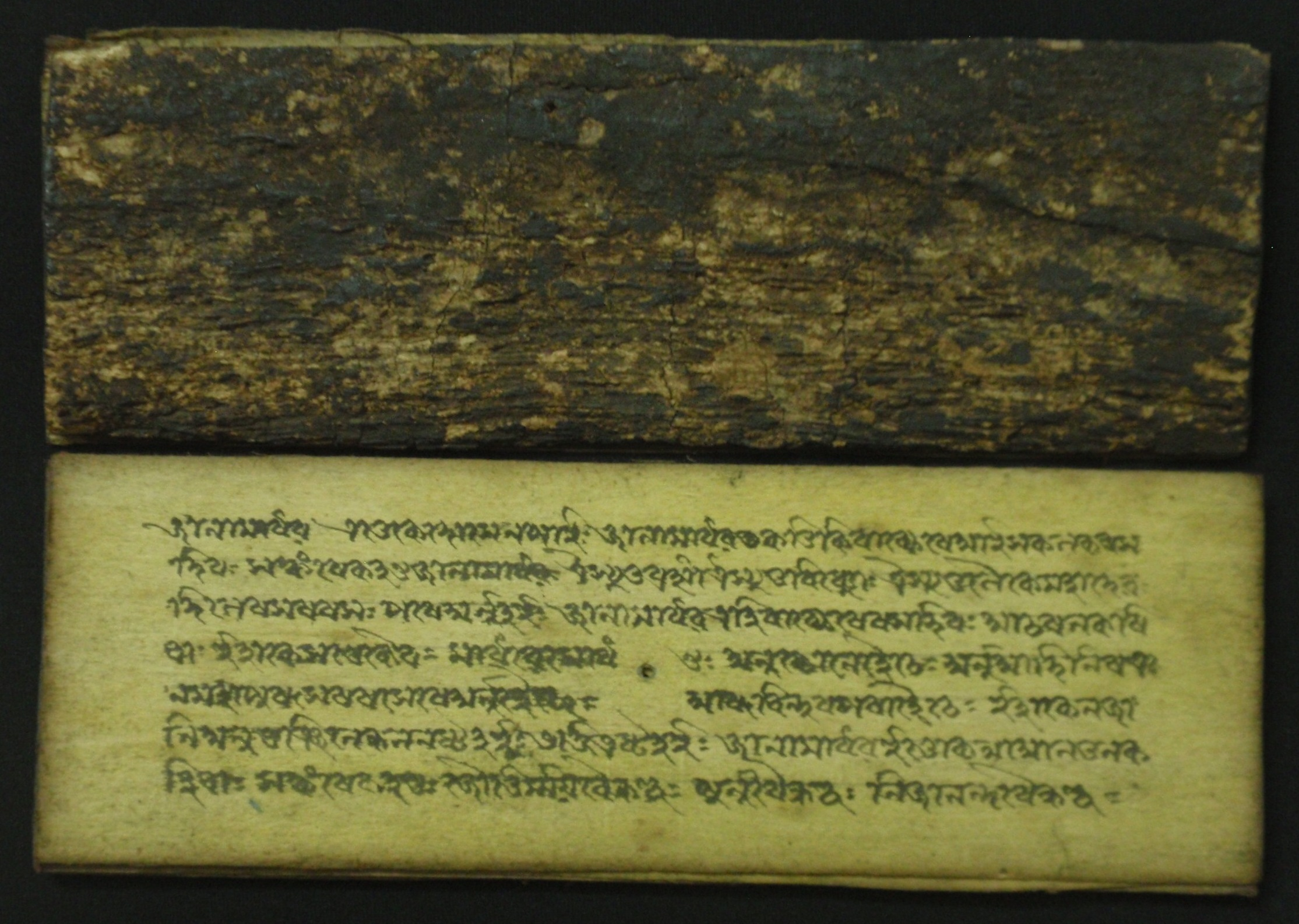
- Also known as: Sanchi manuscript
- Place of origin: Assam, 1st–7th century CE
- Language(s): Assamese, Ahom
- Material: Bark of Aquilaria malaccensis
- Size: Typically 9-27" by 3-18"
- Format: Strung, as palm-leaf manuscript
- Script: Assamese alphabet, Ahom script
- Illumination: Painting of Assam
- Exemplars: Gita Govinda; Hastividyarnava

Sanchipat (Note: Assamese: সাঁচিপাত, Assamese pronunciation: [xãsipat]; also spelled Sancipat and Sanchi-pat.) (Assamese: সাঁচিপাত, sān̐cipāt, lit. 'sanchi leaves', Assamese pronunciation: [xãsipat]) are Assamese-culture manuscripts made from the bark of the sānci aloe tree, Aquilaria malaccensis. Strips or 'leaves' of bark (agarutvak) are centrally perforated and strung together, similar to a palm-leaf manuscript. Sanchipat are used prominently in traditional Assamese literature, Hindu texts, and Assamese manuscript painting. The manuscripts' material construction is pest-resistant and resistant to decomposition.

== History ==
Per Dr. V. Jeyaraj of Government Museum, Chennai, sanchipat was used as early as 15 CE. The earliest accounts of sanchipat are from the 7th century CE: it is mentioned in Harshacharita, wherein Bhaskaravarman of Kamarupa gifted Harshavardhana a sanchipat "the hue of the ripe pink cucumber;" and in the Āryamañjuśrīmūlakalpa.

The zenith of sanchipat production was during the 15th-16th century spread of the Ekasarana Dharma by Srimanta Sankardev. The central holy text, the Bhagavat of Sankardev, is a key devotional object for altars. A cottage industry of sanchipat producers and scribes emerged to meet the demand for devotional texts. Koch Bihar and the Ahom kingdom both patronized this cottage industry.

Cotton paper (tulapat) was a locally produced alternative to sanchipat, typically used for lay uses like letters and bureaucratic record-keeping, dating as early as the 16th century.

With the introduction of mass-produced paper, sanchipat production declined, and the cottage industry died out.

== Construction ==
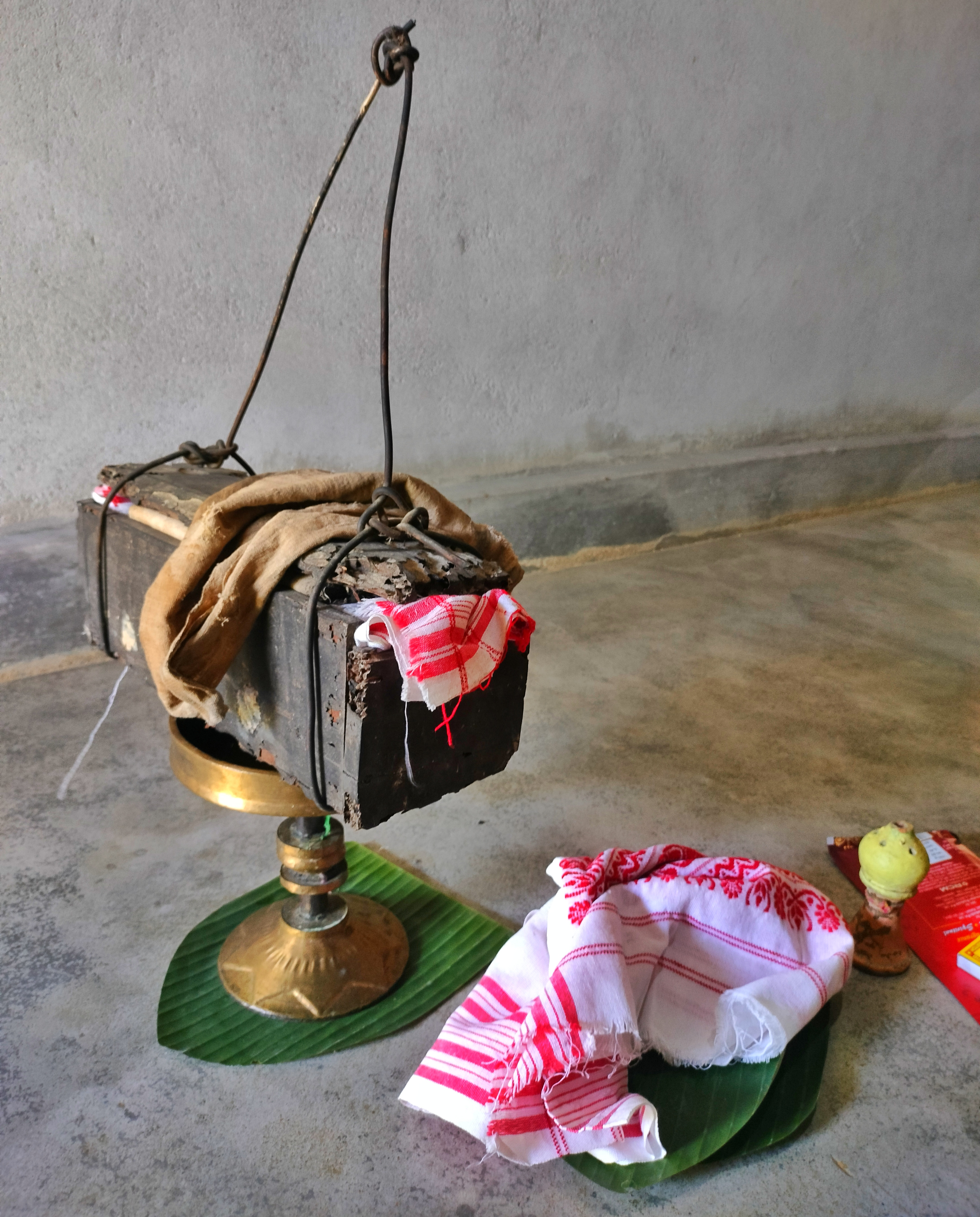
Traditional box for holding sanchipat

Stripped bark from Aquilaria malaccensis is utilized based on thickness. Thin strips constitute the 'leaves' of the sanchipat, to be perforated and strung into the main manuscript chain. Particularly large and thin pieces are kept for high-quality manuscripts. Thick strips are used as covers to the book sanchipat. Small or unusual pieces are utilized for personal records, called beti-pāt (lit. 'attendant leaves').

Leaves are typically 9-27" long by 3-18" wide rectangle. The strips are repeatedly soaked and sun-dried to remove pests, using a solution of aloe vera, chalcanthite, and Croton tiglium seed to pull gum from the bark. The treated bark is scraped and burnished smooth. The leaves are then sized with mung bean paste. Traditionally, the leaves are dyed with orpiment and bordered with vermilion, adhered with the gum from Aegle marmelos. This coloring is called hengul-haital. Leaves are finally perforated and strung on a cord.

The application of chalcanthite (copper(II) sulfate), orpiment (arsenic trisulfide) and vermilion (mercury sulfide) make the manuscripts pest-resistant and antifungal. Orpiment and vermilion are toxic to humans.

=== Mahi ===
Mahi is a traditional herbal ink used for sanchipat inscriptions. Compared to contemporaneous iron gall ink, mahi is non-corrosive and anti-fungal.

The ink is composed of a mix of fruits, bark and herbs, varying with availability:

- Fruits: Emblica officinalis, Terminalia belerica, Terminalia chebula
- Bark: Artocarpus lakoocha, Eugenia jambolana, Mangifera indica. Terminalia belerica, Terminalia chebula
- Herbs: Centella asiatica, Eclipta alba, Hydrocotyle sibthorpioides

The selected mixture is soaked in cow urine, out of the light during the winter. A source of iron oxide is added: typically hot rusty iron, but the blood of the eel Ophichthys cuchia or the shark catfish Pangasius sutchi are also used. When the iron oxide is added, the mixture darkens with the creation of iron-polyphenols. The darkened mixture is finally percolated through a porous earthenware pot to yield mahi.

Mahi may also contain the mucus of earthworms; wood ash; and dew. Per Hemchandra Goswami, the 16th century Ahom king Sukhaamphaa received a sanchipat from Koch Bihar that was written in invisible ink made from the phosphorescent mucus, only legible in the dark.

== Uses ==
=== Buranjis ===
The buranjis are the chronicles of the Ahom kingdom. Also called vamsāvali, they were written in the Ahom language by Ahom religion priests, by decree of the Ahom dynasty.

Satria buranjis are chronicles of satras, religious centers of the Assamese Ekasarana Dharma sect of Vaishnavism.

=== Genealogy ===
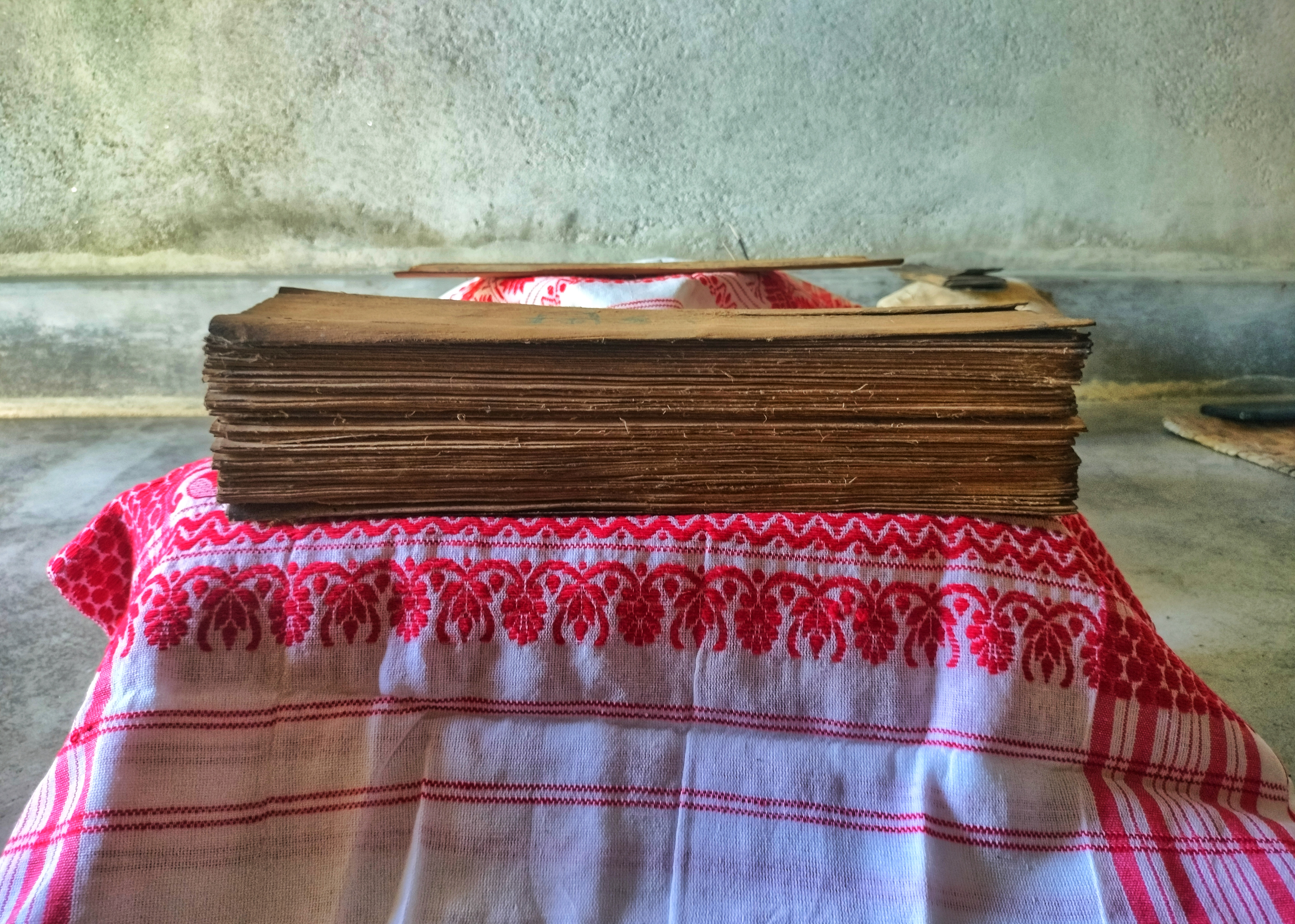
Unwrapped sanchipat

The vamsāvali is a sanchipat genealogy book. Traditionally, Assamese families would not only chronicle ancestry, but personal details as well. The buranji chronicles of the Ahom kingdom are sometimes called vamsāvali.

=== Religious texts ===
Sanchipat are the traditionally favored manuscript for copies of Hindu religious texts in Ekasarana Dharma. The Bhagavat of Sankardev is a required part of devotional shrines, both in satra religious centers and in family shrines.

== See also ==
- Agarwood or oudh, the resinous parasitized heartwood of Aquilaria
- Birch bark manuscript
- Palm-leaf manuscript
- Lokta paper
- Tibetan paper
