= Assamese manuscript painting =

Hindu painting tradition

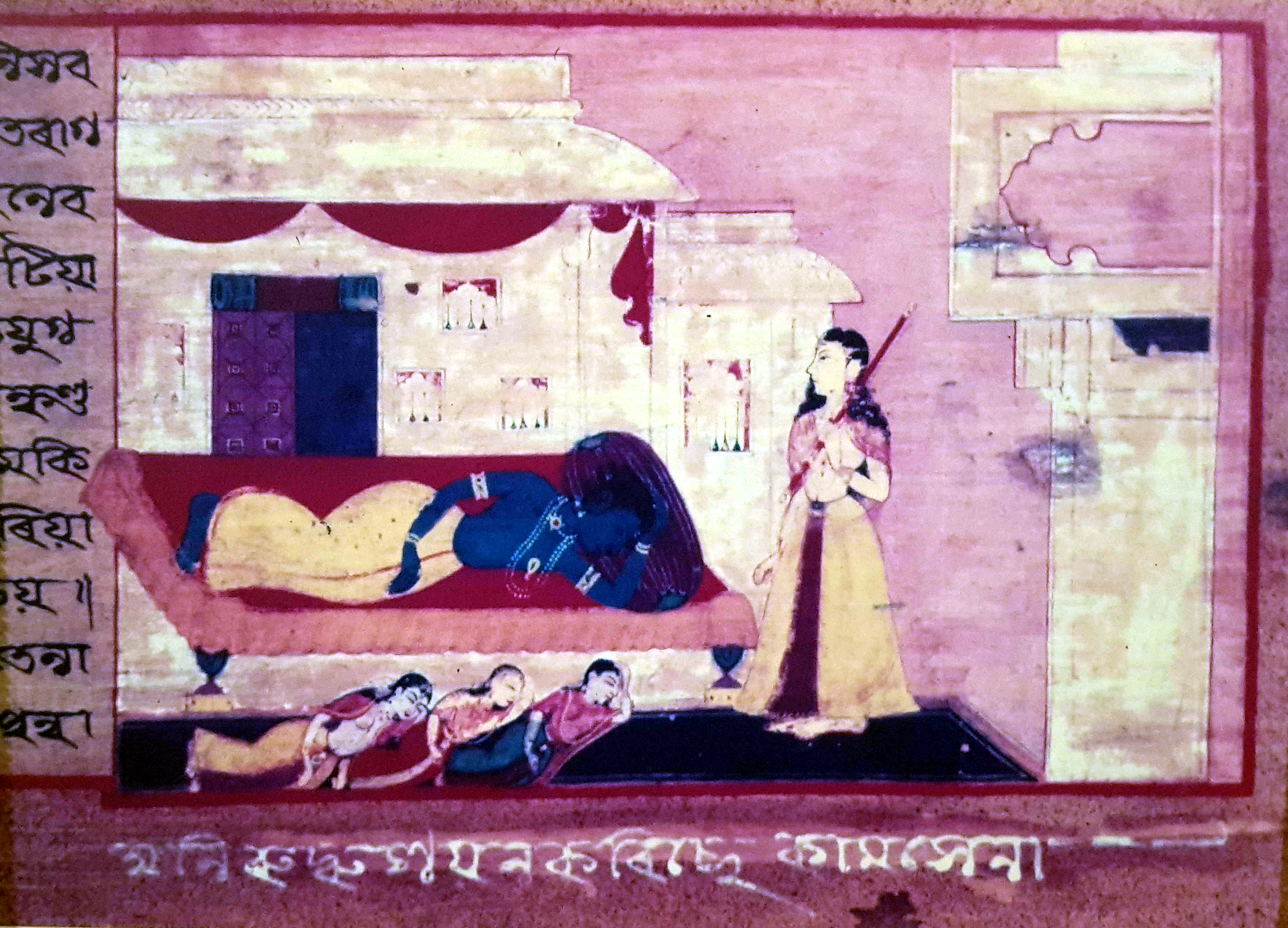
A manuscript painting from Brihat Usaharan, an assamese manuscript painting from Budhbari Satra

Assamese manuscript painting in the Assam region developed through the movement of Vaishnavism. Vaishnava saints were primarily responsible for the establishment of manuscript painting tradition in Assam. A large number of manuscript paintings were done and copied during the 16th to 19th centuries. Assam has a very long history of visual art from the pre-historic age up to the end of Ahom rule in 1826 A.D. Among the earliest reference of Assam painting, the account of Chinese traveller Xuanzang records that King Bhaskaravarman of Kamarupa who was a friend of King Harsa of Kanauj presented the king “Carved boxes of panels for painting with brushes and gourds."

The tradition of manuscript painting in Assam was developed in direct response to the Neo-Vaisnavism introduced by the great leader, social reformer, Vaisnava saint Sankardev (1449-1568 A.D.) Most of these manuscripts have been produced on sancipat.

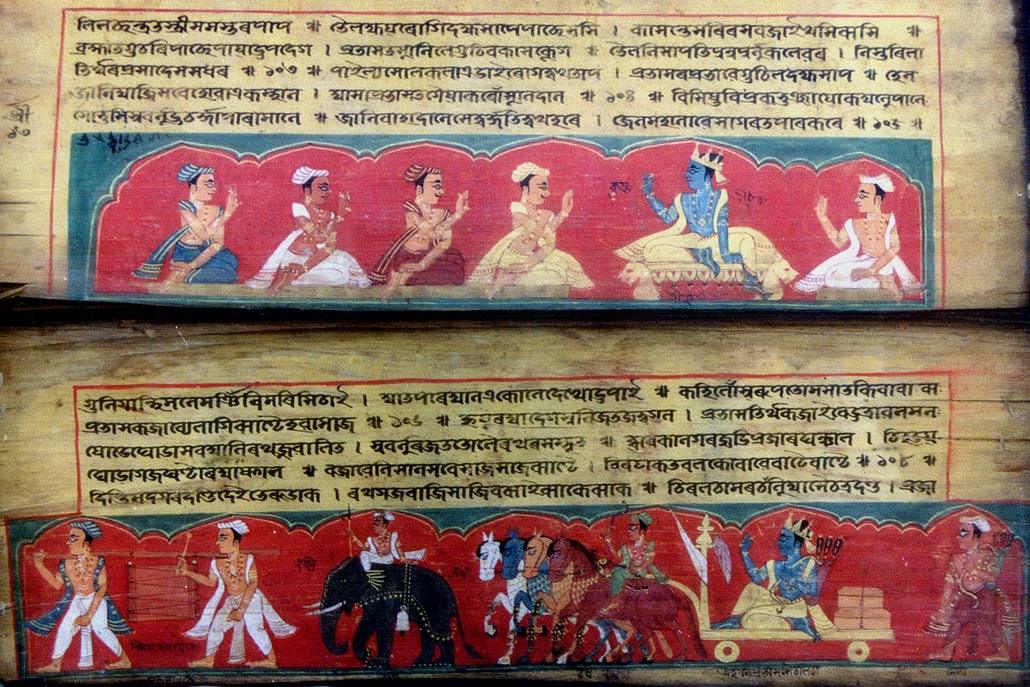
Illustrated Manuscript of Dakhinpat Satra

Manuscript leaves were made with locally available ingredients. The process of making sanchi pat was discussed by Sir E. A. Gait. Another material used for making manuscripts was tulapat or cotton paper, but was not as popular as sanchipat. The painters involved in the creation of paintings were organised under a khel/guild during the medieval period. The officer in-charge of this khel was known as Khanikar Boruah. The khanikar beside painting also knew art of making idols both of wood and of earth, masks for drama, mural paintings, wood carvings and Xorai.

== Styles of Art ==
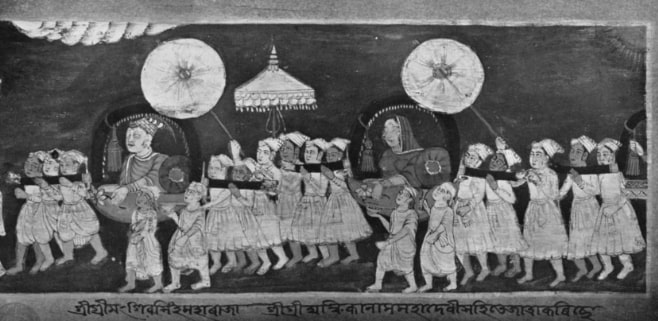
Court procession. Garhgoan style of painting depicted in Dharma Puran of Kavichandra Dvijya and illustrated by Badha Ligira.

(Dasgupta, 1972) refers to 6 streams or styles of different schools of Assamese painting such as; Tai–Ahom School, Sattriya School, Darrang School and Garhgaon School (court style). But according to other scholars like e.g. Neog, Kalita and Saikia these styles come to three to four excluding or including the Tai-Ahom style. For them the styles are mainly three; Satriya, Court (Garhgaon, Provincial Mughal, Style akin to Garhgaon merged) and Darrang, if and when Tai-Ahom is excluded. (Saikia, 2016), according to him the painting styles of Assam could be divided into three branches or styles; Sattriya style, Rajghariya Style and Decoration only. The third style denotes the manuscripts with border decoration not illustrations. (Saikia, 2016) ignores Tai–Ahom style because of its ''primitivity, lack of vigour, dominance and continuity. '' (Kalita, 2014) also only refers to two styles of Assamese manuscript paintings: Sattriya style (Sattra/ Vaisanavite monastery based), and the Ahom Rajsabha (Ahom court based).

== Tai-Ahom style ==
The Ahoms when coming from Upper Burma to Upper Assam, bring with them their cultural heritage and skill. Phung Chin manuscript illustrated in Ahom language dated to 1473 A.D, it is considered among the earliest extant manuscript illustrations of Assam now preserved at, DHAS (Department of Historical and Antiquarian Studies, Guwahati). Suktanta Kympong is another illustrated manuscript in Ahom script dated to around 1523 A.D. Both manuscripts were made on handmade paper (Tula-pat). In both manuscripts the depiction of the Buddha image is common. Some other Tai-Ahom manuscripts are: Phe-Ban (Omen & Divination), Kukura-Theng (Chicken bone Divination), Phura-long (Jataka Story), etc. These individual manuscripts contain some figurative line drawings and sketches which are may not truly be considered under the category of painting.

== Sattriya Style ==
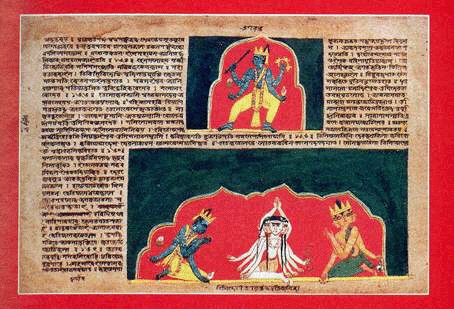
A page of manuscript painting from Assam. Sattriya style of Painting.

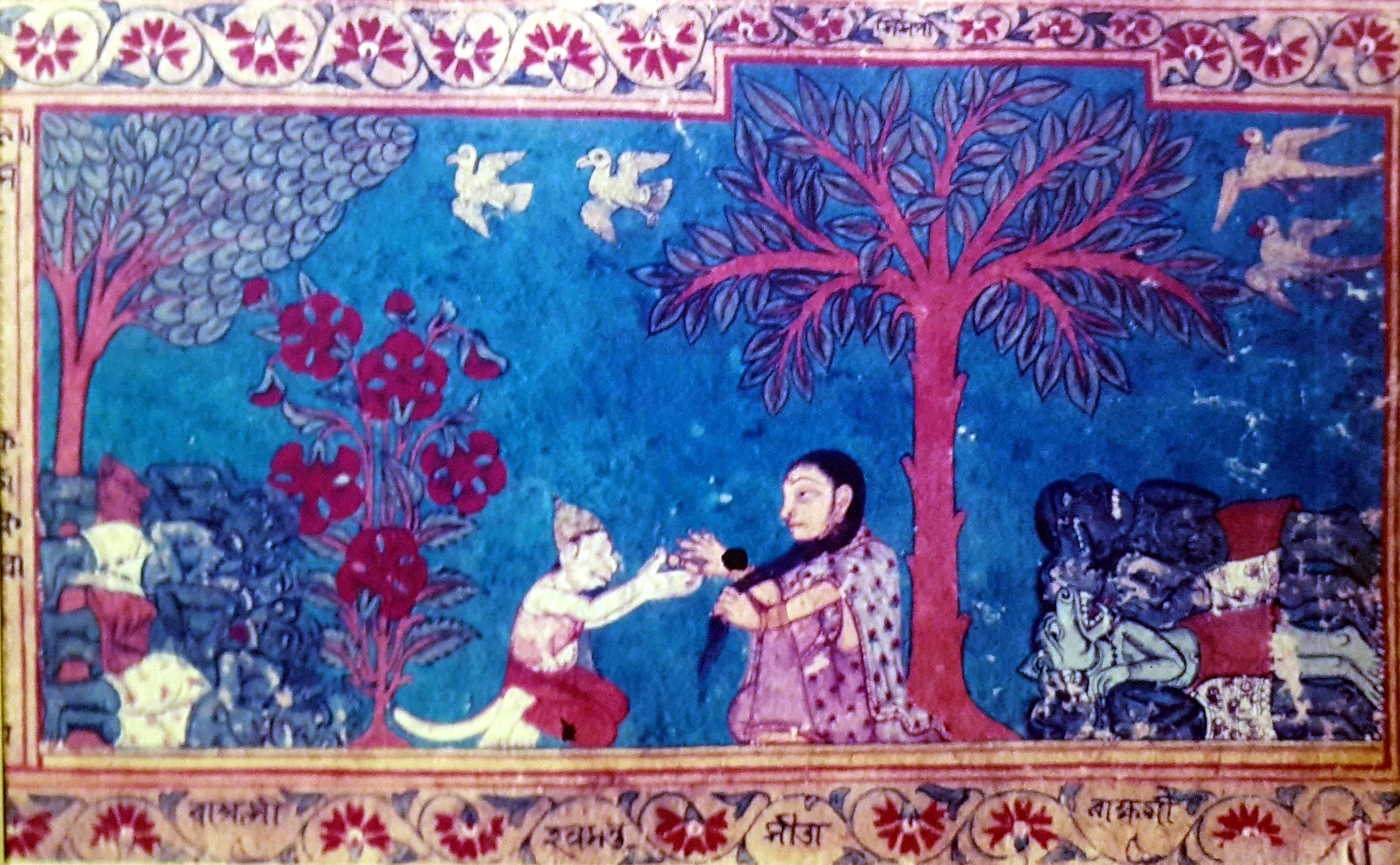
Court style painting later incorporated into Sattriya style

With the influence of Bhakti movement of Sankardev starting onwards from 16th century another style came into front as Satriya style. Sattriya style of painting has been developed and flourished in the Vaisnava monasteries in Assam. Satras or Vaishnavite monasteries of medieval Assam plays a vital role in the shaping of society, religion and culture in the state. The Paintings were done by the Vaishnava monks in the Satras. Though the art of painting was initially advent by the Sankardeva with his scroll painting for the drama Chinayatra, where he illustrated seven Vaikuntha in 1468 A.D. at Bordowa. The art of painting practiced in the satra's with a distinct style, known as the Sattriya style of painting by scholars. The colors used in this style of painting are called Hengul and haital.The style introduces the local architectural design and clothing of the satra culture. ‘Chitra Bhagwata’ or ‘The Bhagawata Book x is the earliest example of illustrated manuscripts of Sattriya style from Bali Satra of Nogoan. One of the earliest dated manuscript illustrations is Bhagavata-Purana, Book 6 dated 1678. It is a transcript of the book written by Sankaradeva.

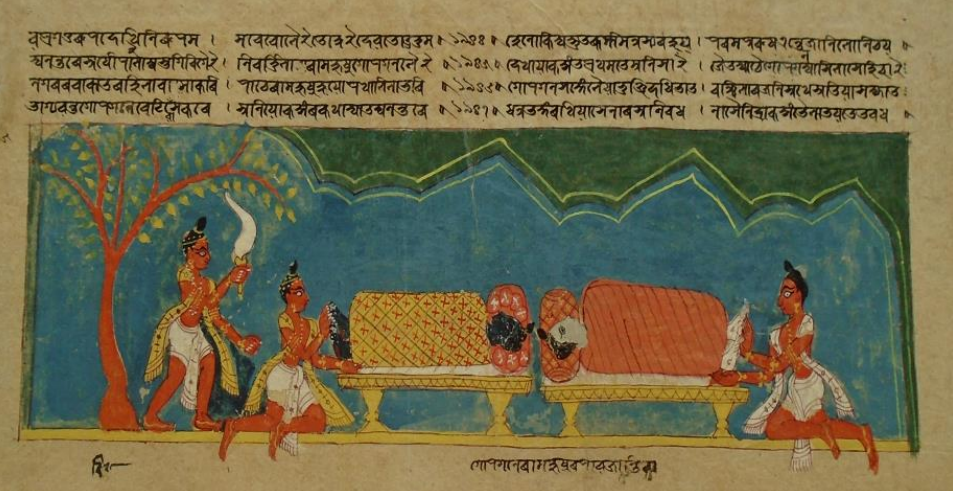
A scene from Chitra Bhagavata, Narowa Bali Satra.

Other illustrated manuscripts of the Sattriya style includes: Bhakti Ratnavali 1605 Saka (1683 A.D), Bhagavata Purana, Book X (Adi Dasama/Chitra Bhagavata), Bar Kirtan, Bhagavata-Purana, Book XI (1697 A.D). According to Kalita, “The best of the pictures in the repertory of Assamese painting belonging to the Sattriya idiom has been rendered in late 17th century A.D.” (Kalita, 2009) But we have other manuscripts of the style such as Vanamali Devar Charita of Ramakanta Dwija; Sri Bhagavata Matsya Charita of Nitananda Kayastha, A.D 1644–50; Gita Govinda, translated by Kaviraj Chakravarti, A.D. 1644- 50; Lava Kushar Yudha of Harivar Vipra, A.D 1714 -1744; Ananda Lahari of Ananta Acharya Dwija, A.D 1714–44; Ramayana (Sundara Kanda) A.D. 1715; Sankara Charita; and Ramayana (Lanka Kanda) 1791–1806 A.D.

== Court Style ==
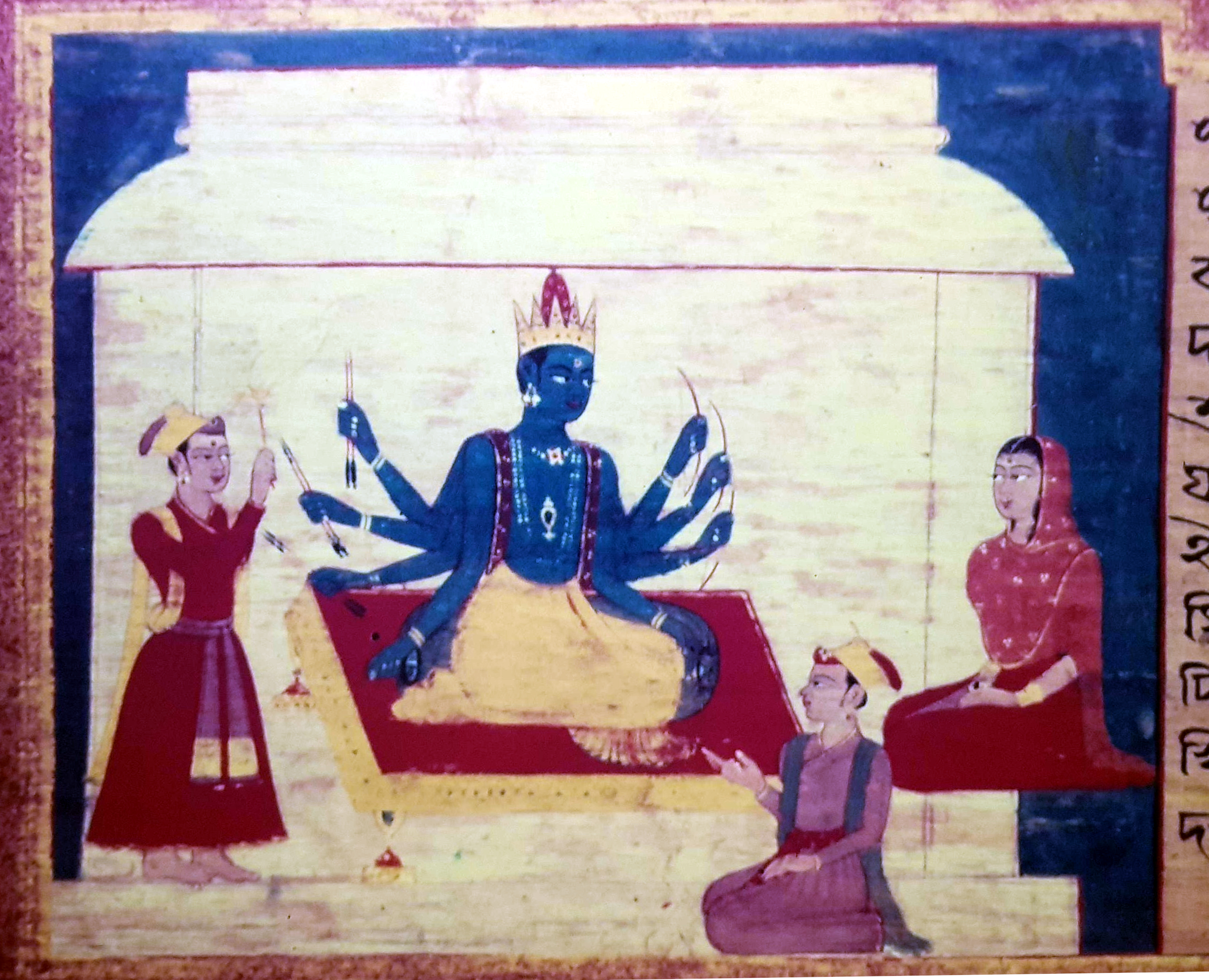
Brihat Ushaharan manuscript painting.

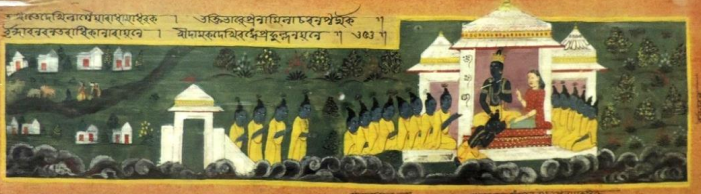
Sankachura Badh illustration

Court style, Rajghariya style or Garhgoan style (as being the capital of the Ahom kingdom later Rangpur) of painting was mainly developed by the court artists of the Ahom Kingdom. Initially, they employed artists or khanikars (artisans) from sattras, later employed many artisans from various parts of India. This art style was started by Rudra Singha (A.D. 1696–1714), who ordered the illustration of Gita Govinda.

It was continued under the reign of his successor Siva Singha and his consorts Pramathesvari Devi and Ambika Devi under whom the finest of painting of Assam were produced. The royal court attracted more professional artisans from Sattra's and the court further strengthened by inviting to its fold the professional Mughal artists. The new and secular style of painting thus emerges in eastern Assam under the Ahoms with beautiful paintings in such works as the Hastividyarnava, Sankhachuda- vadha, Gita govinda and Lavakusar Yuddha.

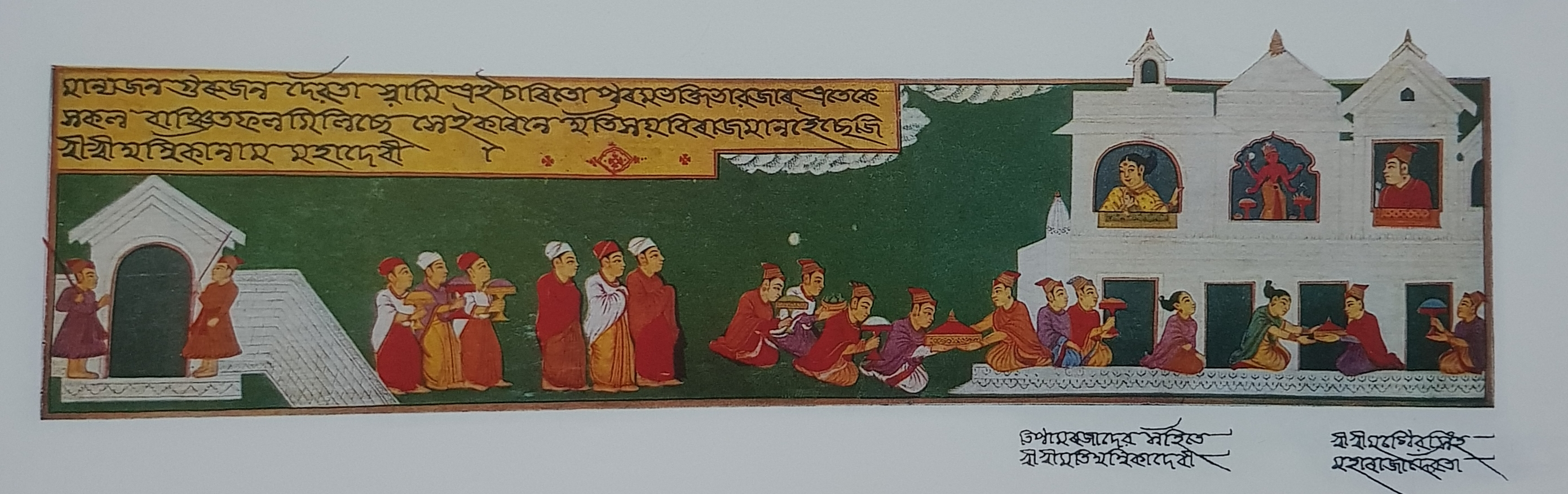
Hastividyarnava, an exapmple of court painting

== Darrang Style ==
During the time of peace in the middle early part of 18th century Sattriya pictorial idiom moved for the first time to Darrang . But the artisans there were not as talented as their Majuli counterparts. Some of the illustrations of Darrang style are: Kaumudi, Anadi Patana (1782 A.D) and the Bhagavata – Purana Book VIII (1804 A.D). The most important example of the later Darrang manuscript miniatures is the Darrang Raj Vamsavali. This style comes to an end with the de-thronement of Krishnanaryana in 1805.

== Decline ==
The Manuscript painting culture declined after the Moamoria rebellion due to the devastation caused by it, followed by Burmese invasions of Assam. After the collapse of Ahom government and lack of patronization called for the ways of its decline.

== Gallery ==
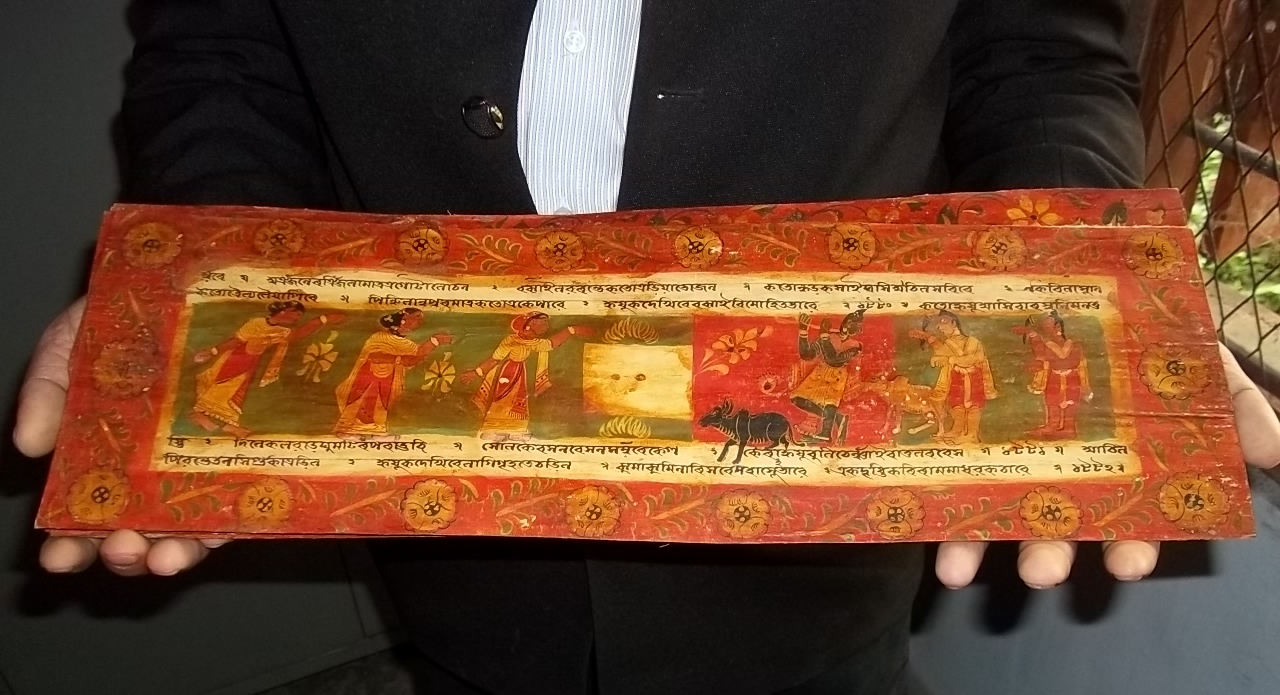
Bhagwat illustration of Bengenaati Satra

Hastividyarnava

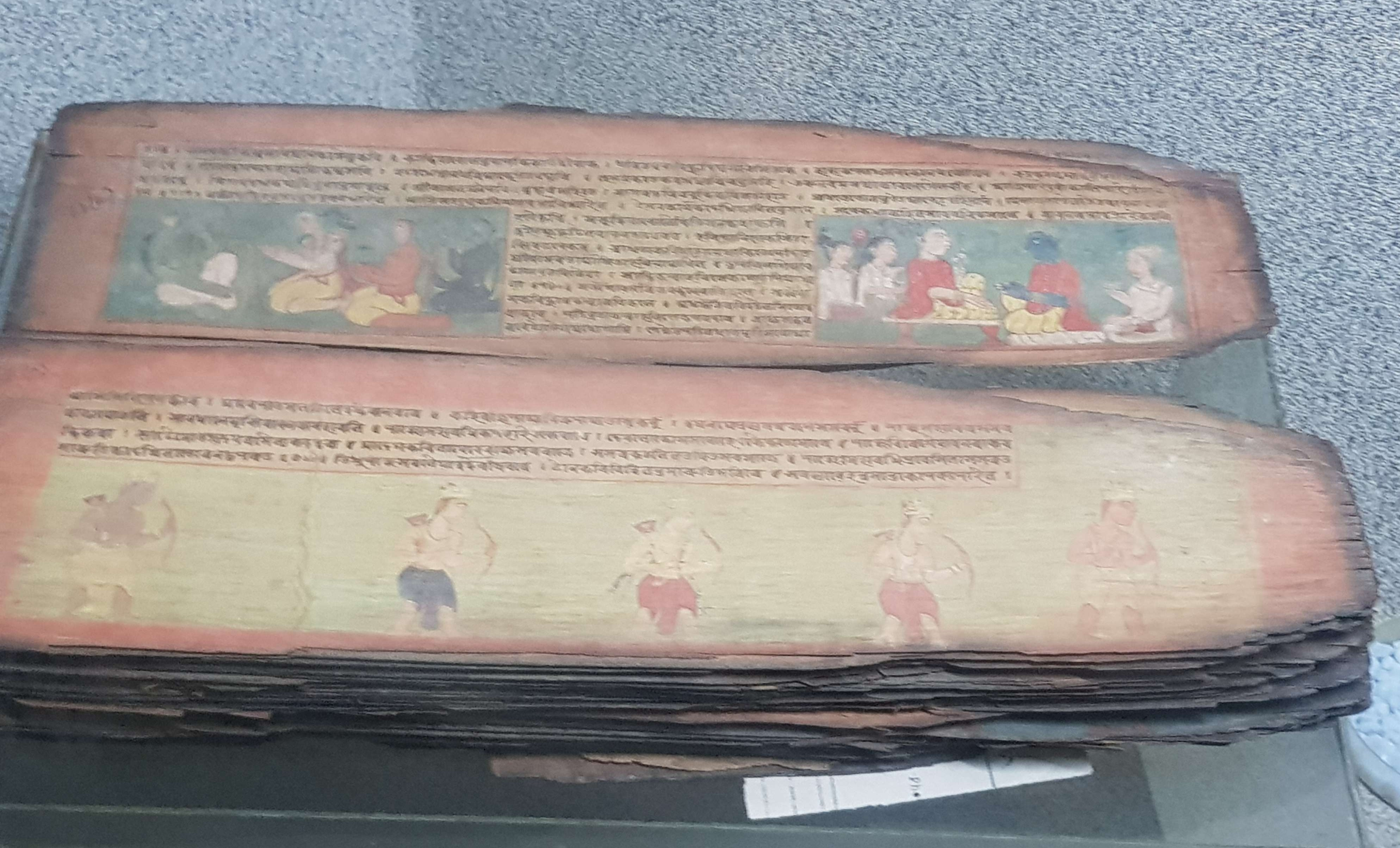
Illustrated Ramayan

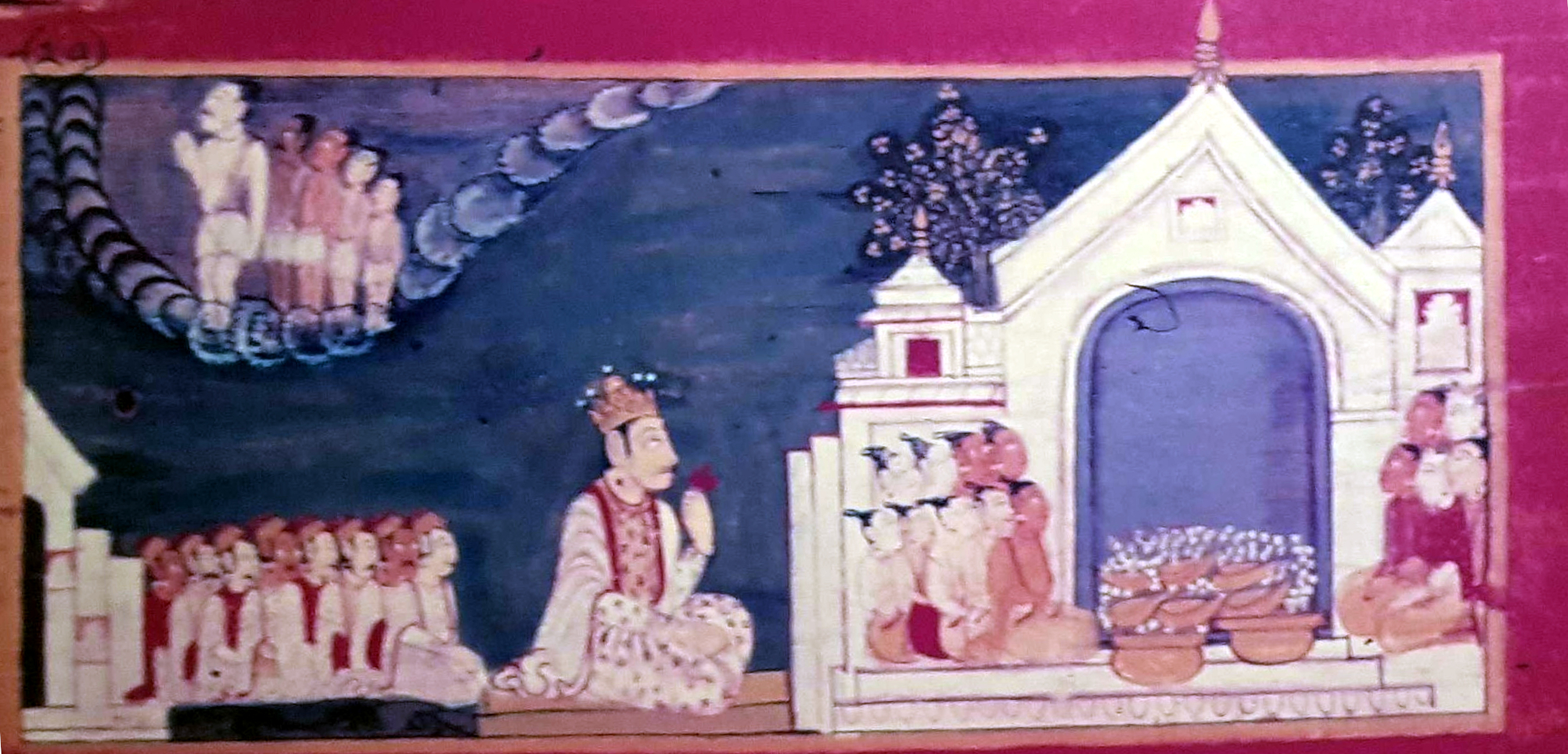
Katha-Bhagawat illustration, made under Garhgoan style

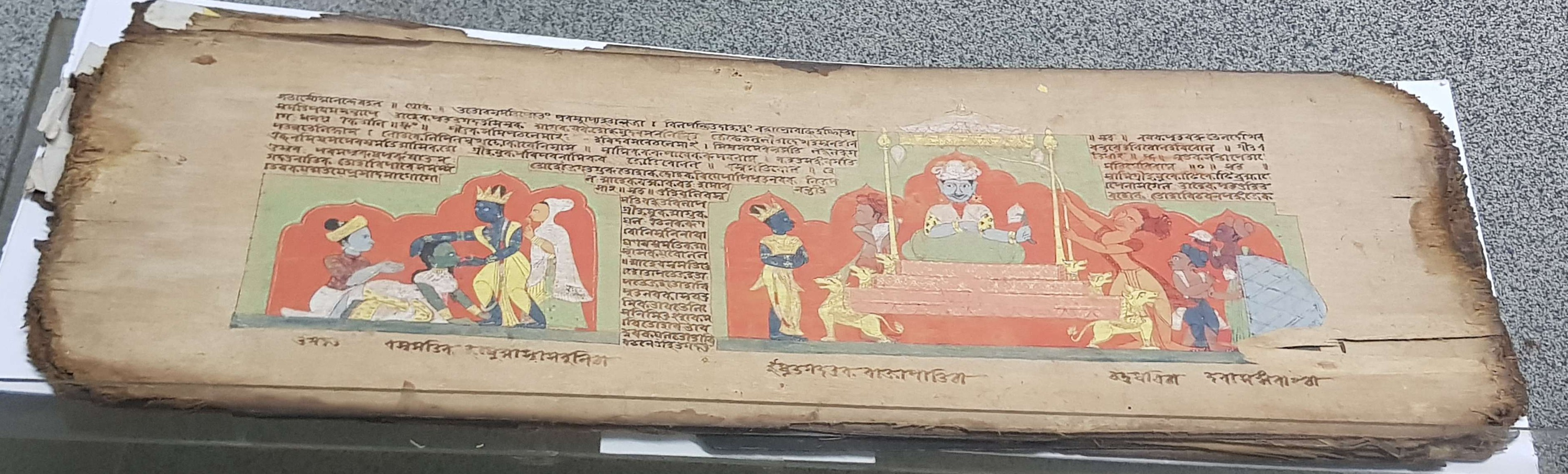
Illustrated Parijat Haran

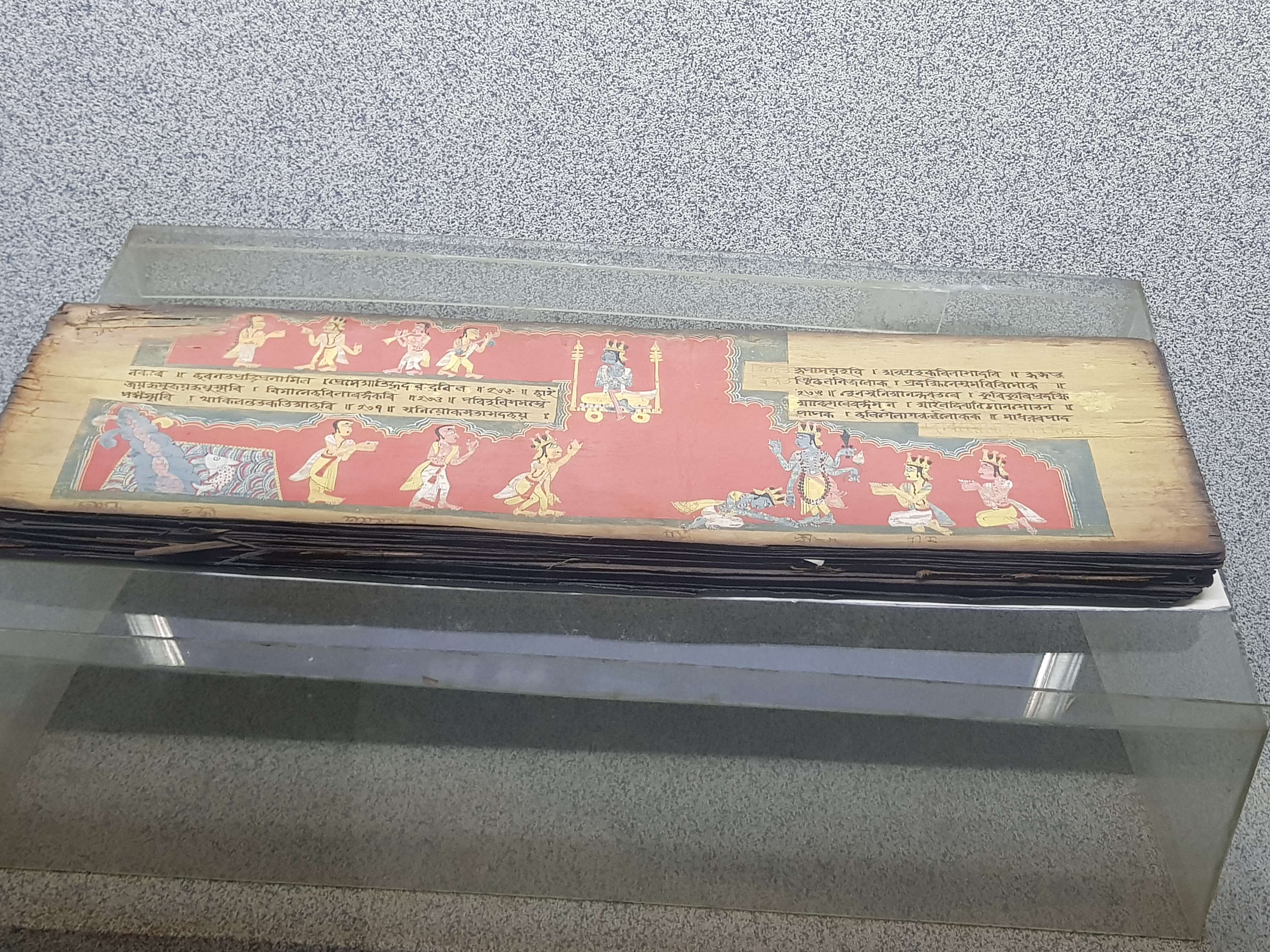
Illustrated manuscript

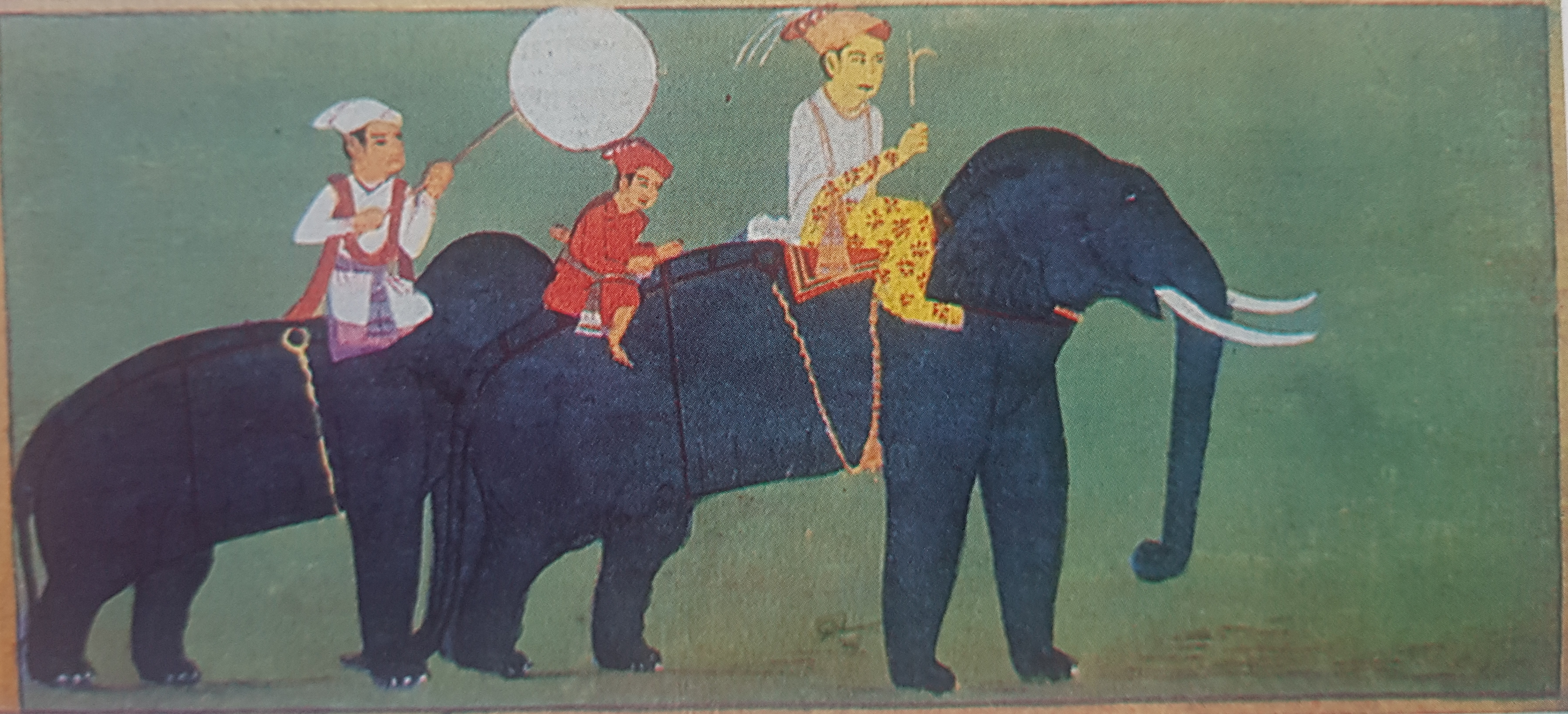
Hastividyarnava Illustration

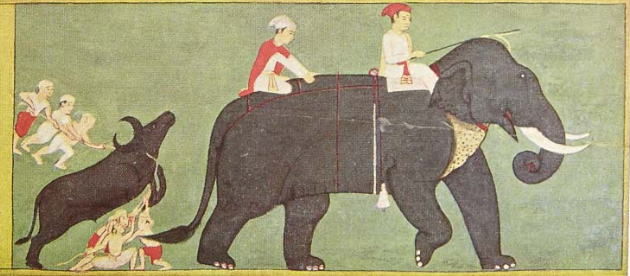
Hastividyarnava Illustration
