= Tibetan paper =

Paper made from Stellera chamaejasme

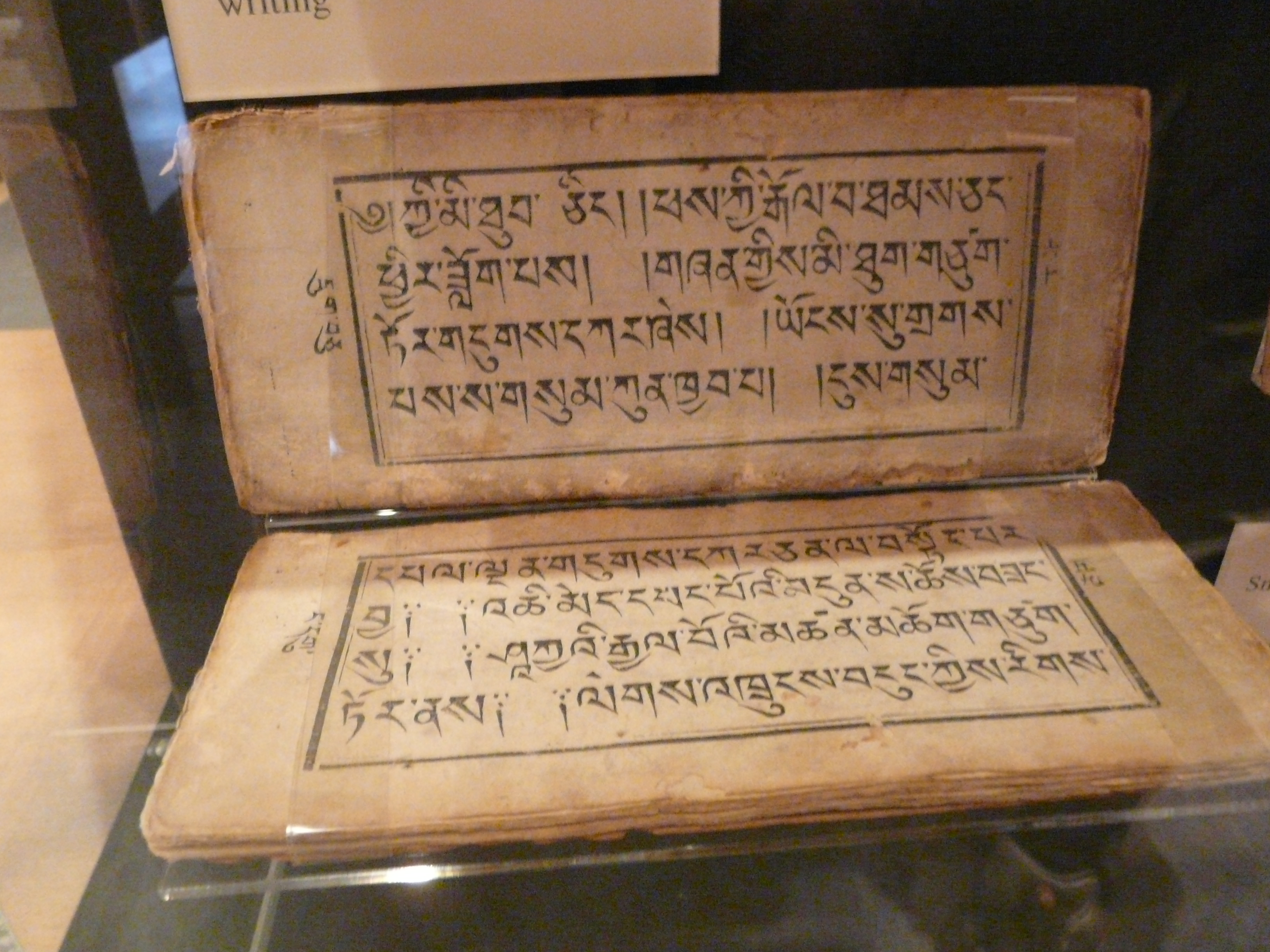
- Tibetan accordion book codex
- Type: Paper
- Material: Stellera chamaejasme; also Daphne, Edgeworthia
- Production method: Handmade; pulp and deckle
- Place of origin: Tibet, particularly Ü-Tsang
- Introduced: c. 648 CE
- Manufacturer: Tibetan people

Tibetan paper (Standard Tibetan: shog) is a handmade paper from Tibet made from the root of Stellera chamaejasme (rejag, re lcag pa). Introduced in the 7th century, Tibetan paper is pest-repellent, due to Stellera's poisonous compounds.

== History ==
Papermaking was introduced to Tibet from Tang China. The earliest recorded mention of Tibetan paper was a 648 CE request from the founder of the Tibetan Empire, Songtsen Gampo, to Taizong of Tang for paper and writing materials, recorded in the Old Book of Tang. Paper may have been introduced to the region earlier by the Princess Wencheng, who married Songtsen Gampo in 641 CE. Wooden slips were banned by imperial Tibetan edict in 744 in favor of paper.

In early Tibetan papermaking, lower-altitude Kham and Amdo first produced paper made from the bark of Daphne, Edgeworthia, or Wikstroemia shrubs, much like Nepali Lokta paper. The unique Tibetan paper came about as papermakers in higher-altitude Ü-Tsang and Ngari relied on the hardier, native Stellera.

Archaeological caches of Tibetan paper include the Dunhuang manuscripts. Early Tibetan paper was used in accordion book codices, which were printed with woodblocks.

== Production ==
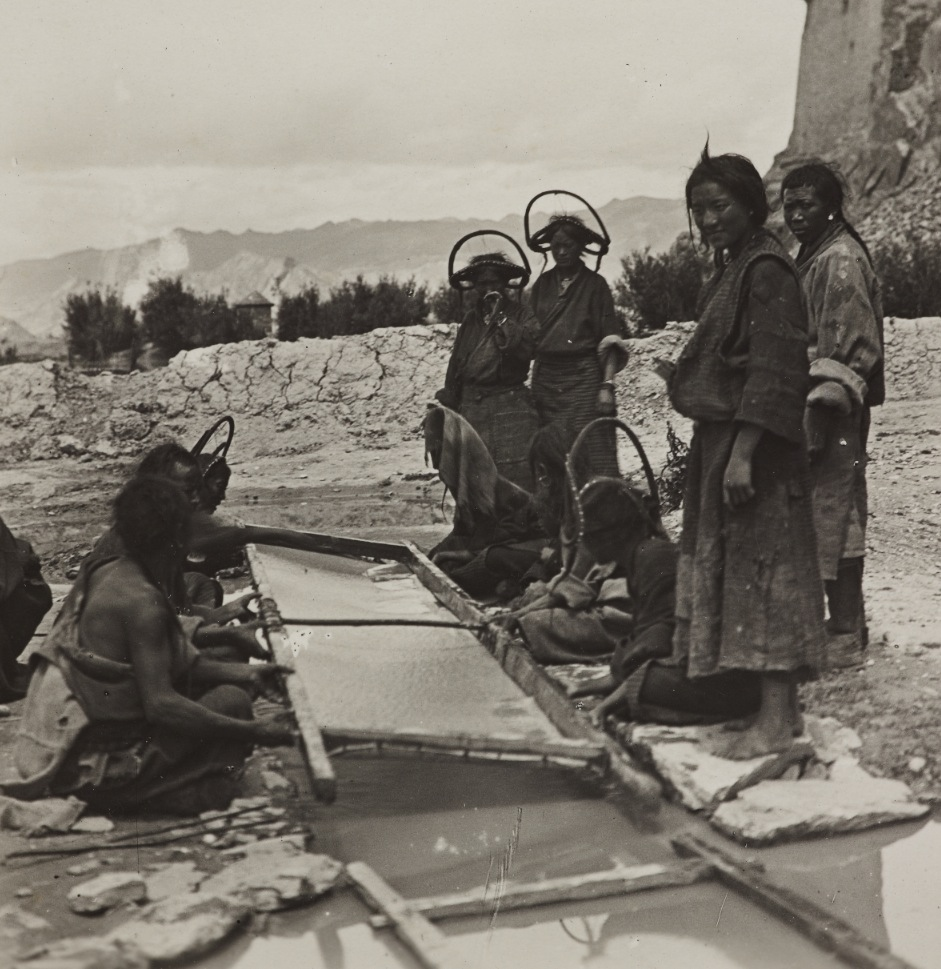
Gyantse papermakers, c. 1915

Tibetan paper uses the bast fiber of the root and stem of Stellera, sometimes mixed with Daphne or Edgeworthia bark; the plant's epidermis is stripped, then the bast stripped further away. The fibers are boiled with barley, wood ash, and other additives. After washing, the fibers are pulped and made into a slurry before screening with a floating deckle and drying.

The paper could then be layered together with wheatpaste, sized and burnished with a dzi bead for smoothness and strength. Historically, yak milk was used with wheatpaste.

=== Toxicity ===
The natural toxins in Stellara make the final paper pest-resistant. Workers who are exposed to the toxins in Stellera during processing can experience headaches, rashes, hives and skin peeling.

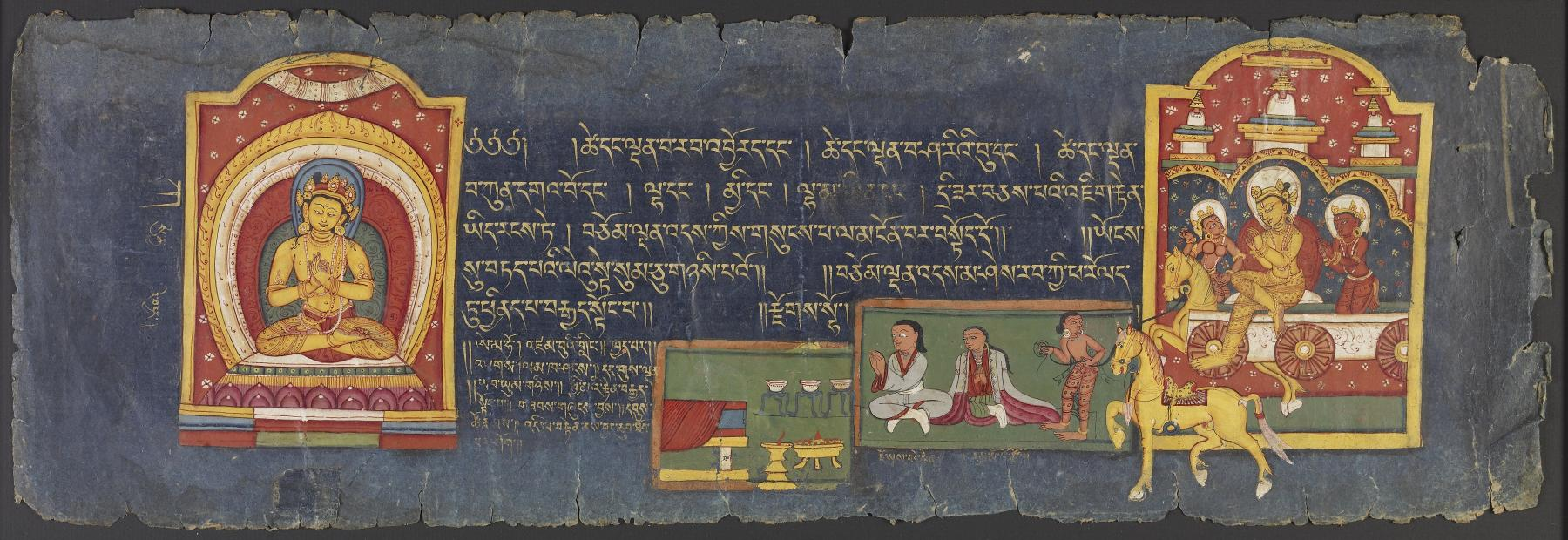
Thing shog Buddhist text

=== Thingshog paper ===
Thingshog paper (Dzongkha: མཐིང་ཤོག་བཟོ་ཐངས། mthing shog bzo thangs, transl. blue-black paper) is a specialty Tibetan paper, prized for gifts and monastic use. The paper is produced by sizing Daphne paper with a combination of hide glue from yak hide, yak brains, soot or lamp-black, and pine resin. Layers of paper are tacked together and laminated with wheatpaste, then sometimes burnished with a dzi bead, or dyed with indigo as desired. Calligraphy on thingshog paper was often painted in gold leaf by Lhasa Newar. Vermillion was used for bordering.

== Modern revival ==
Tibetan papermaking, particularly with the unique fiber from Stellera, has been revived as a folk craft in Nyêmo County.

== See also ==
- Buddhist texts
- Khoi paper
- Mulberry paper
- Kashmiri paper
