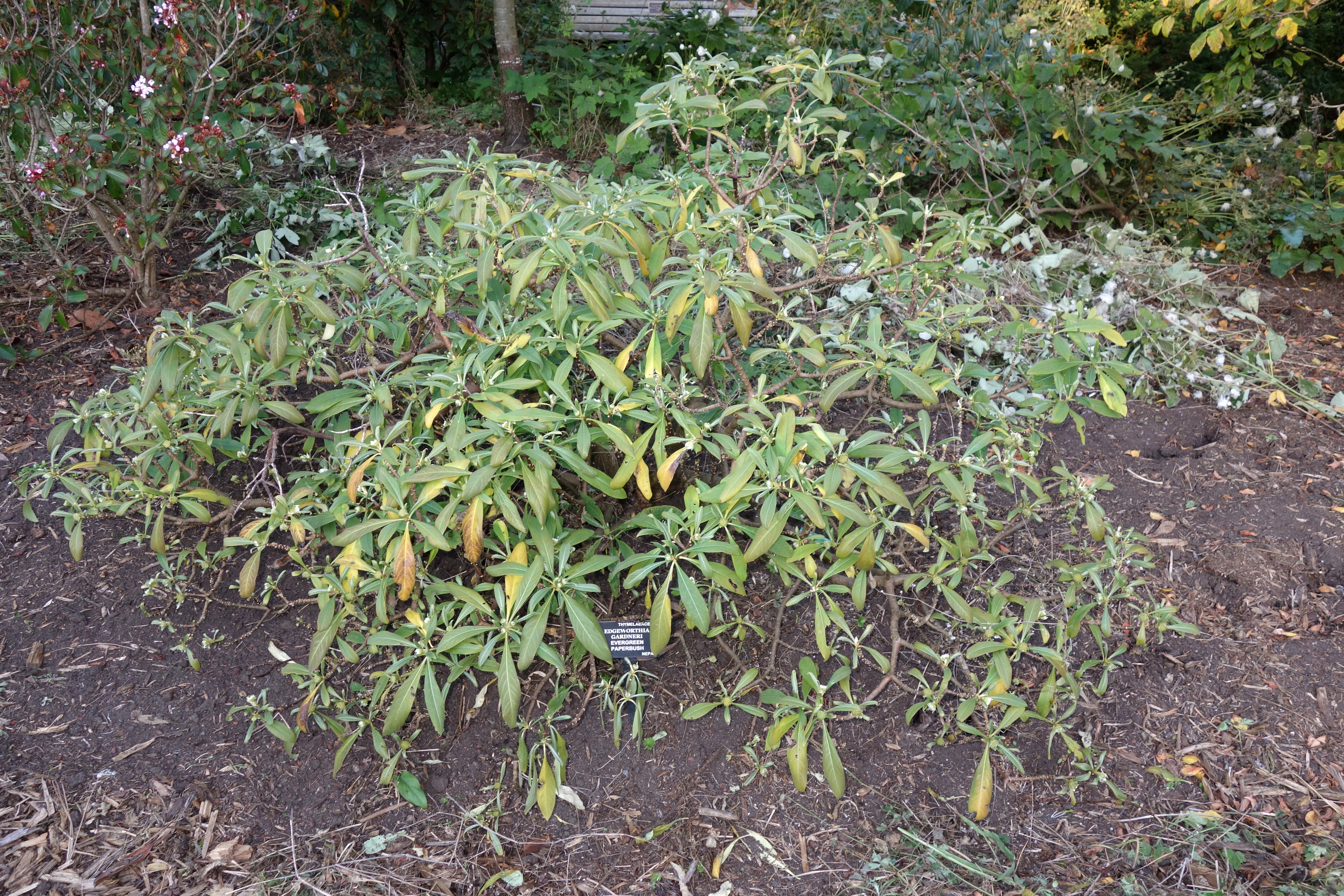

Scientific classification
- Kingdom: Plantae
- Clade: Tracheophytes
- Clade: Angiosperms
- Clade: Eudicots
- Clade: Rosids
- Order: Malvales
- Family: Thymelaeaceae
- Genus: Edgeworthia
- Species: E. gardneri

Binomial name
- Edgeworthia gardneri (Wall.) Meisn.

Synonyms
- Daphne gardneri Wall. (basionym)

= Edgeworthia gardneri =

Species of flowering plant

Edgeworthia gardneri (common names: Indian papertree, Nepalese paperbush; Nepali: लोकता, लोक्ता, अर्गेली (argelee, argeli)) is a species of flowering plant in the family Thymelaeaceae. It is a small evergreen shrub growing up to 3–4 metres (10–13 ft) tall. It can be distinguished by its brownish red stem. The flowers are hermaphroditic (they have both male and female organs).

== Range and habitat ==
Edgeworthia gardneri is native to the Himalayan regions of Bhutan; northern Burma; China (in eastern Xizang and northwestern Yunnan); India; and Nepal. It is found in forests and moist places at altitudes of 1,000–2,500 m (3,300–8,200 ft).

It is cultivated elsewhere.

== Uses ==
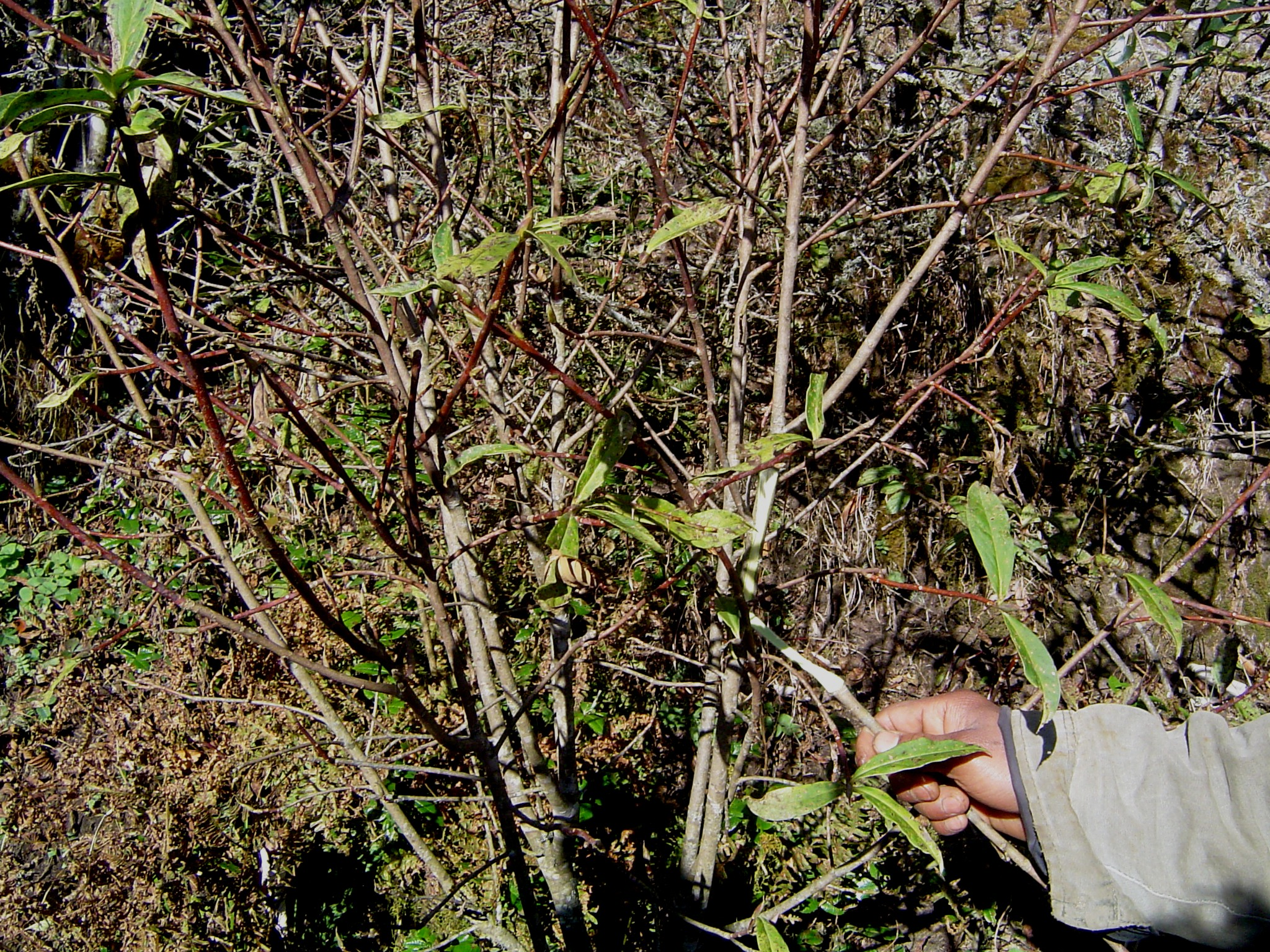
E. gardneri branches and leaves

Edgeworthia gardneri is planted as an ornamental; and a high quality paper is made from its bark fibres. This species is said to be the best of the various species that are used to make hand-made paper in the Himalayas.

As of 2024, Nepal, in particular the Ilam District, was exporting several tens of tonnes per year of the bark to Japan for the printing of Japanese yen banknotes as an alternative to the native Japanese mitsumata, another species in the same genus.
