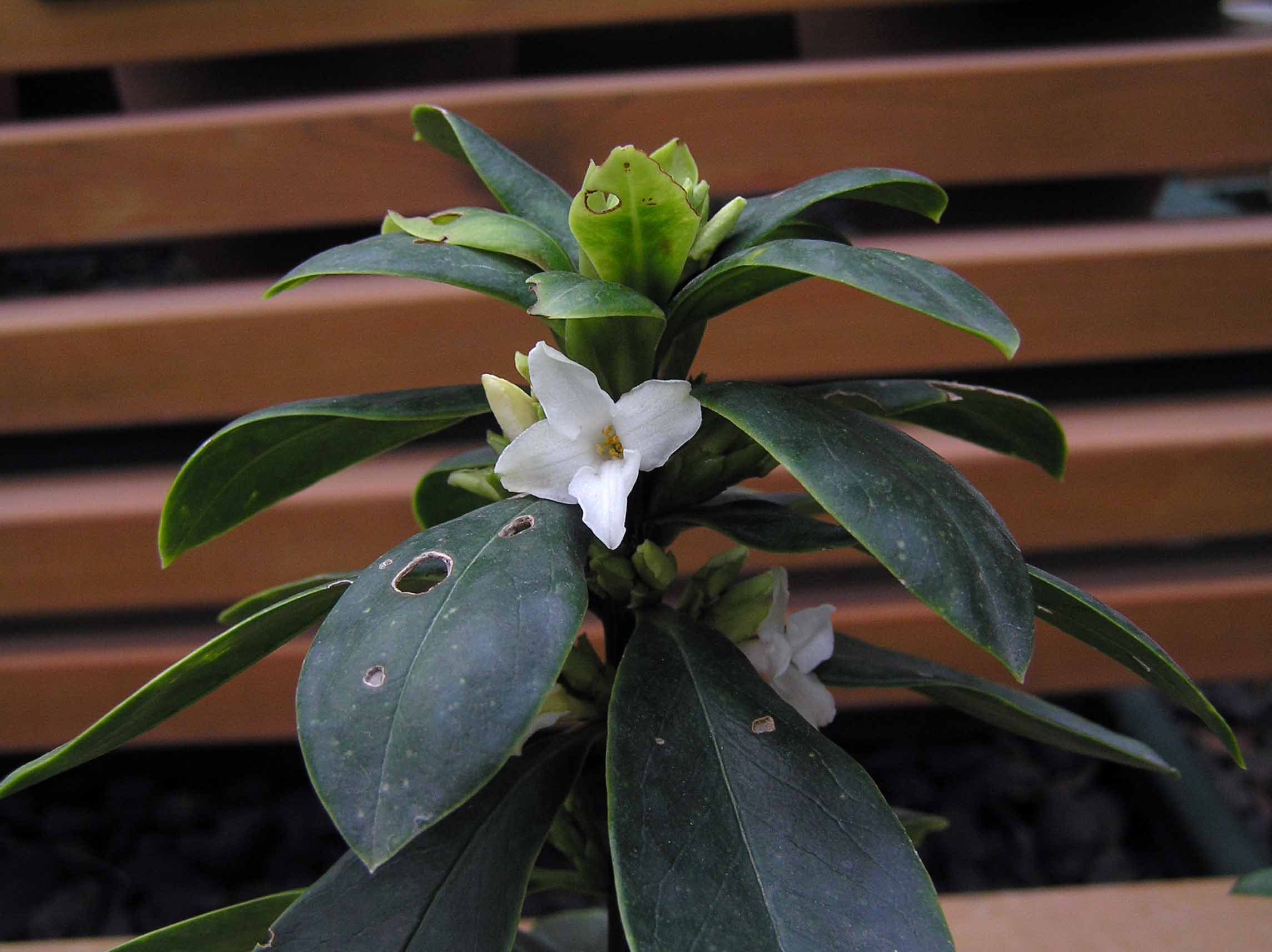

Scientific classification
- Kingdom: Plantae
- Clade: Tracheophytes
- Clade: Angiosperms
- Clade: Eudicots
- Clade: Rosids
- Order: Malvales
- Family: Thymelaeaceae
- Genus: Daphne
- Species: D. papyracea

Binomial name
- Daphne papyracea Wall. ex G.Don

Synonyms
- Daphne cannabina Wall., nom. illeg.

= Daphne papyracea =

Species of shrub

Daphne papyracea is a shrub of the family Thymelaeaceae. It is evergreen, and is found across Asia, from Pakistan through central Nepal to China. Generally it is found at elevations from 700 to 3,100 metres (2,300 to 10,200 ft).

== Description ==
The shrub grows to be up to 1.5 metres (4.9 ft) tall.

== Varieties and subspecies ==
As of October 2025, Plants of the World Online accepted the following varieties:

- Daphne papyracea var. crassiuscula Rehder
- Daphne papyracea var. duclouxii Lecomte
- Daphne papyracea var. grandiflora (Meisn. ex Diels) C.Yung Chang
- Daphne papyracea var. papyracea
- Daphne papyracea var. ptilostykla C.Y.Chang

In 1997 and 2000, Josef Halda reduced some species of Daphne to subspecies of Daphne papyracea. No subspecies are accepted by Plants of the World Online or the online Flora of China.

== Usage for paper ==
It is mentioned as a "paper shrub" by an English botanist in 1818. It is known as the main source of raw material for the production of lokta paper, a hand-made paper from Nepal.
