= Lokta paper =

Nepalese paper

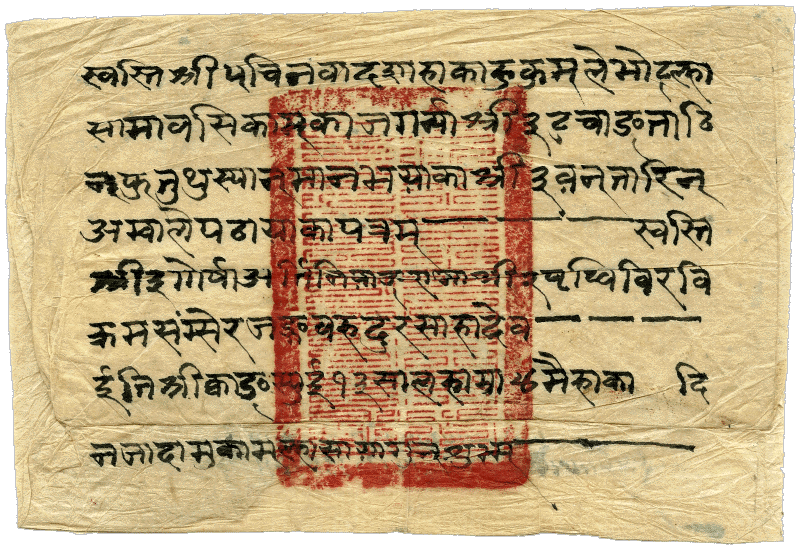
A letter from Tibetan Governor to a Nepalese official written on lokta paper (c. 1887)

Lokta paper, also known as Nepali kagaj or Nepali paper, or incorrectly as rice paper, is a wildcrafted, handmade artisan paper made in Nepal from the bark of two of the species of the shrub Daphne. The paper was used historically in Nepal for religious scriptures and government documents, and is now used for notebooks, religious scripture, arts including painting, and for some government documents.

== Overview ==
Nepalese handmade lokta paper is made from the fibrous inner bark (phloem) of two species of mid- to high-elevation evergreen shrubs belonging to the Thymelaeaceae family: Daphne bholua and Daphne papyracea. Both bushes, and the paper made from them, are called "lokta".

Lokta bushes proliferate in open clusters or colonies on the southern slopes of Nepal's Himalayan forests between 1,600 and 4,000 m (c.5,250–13,000 ft).

Historically lokta paper was hand-made in the rural areas of Nepal, most notably in the Baglung District. Today raw lokta paper is produced in more than 22 districts in Nepal, but finished lokta paper products are produced only in Kathmandu Valley and Janakpur.

Lokta paper's durability and resistance to tearing, humidity, insects and mildew have traditionally made it the preferred choice for the recording of official government records (see photo on right) and sacred religious texts.

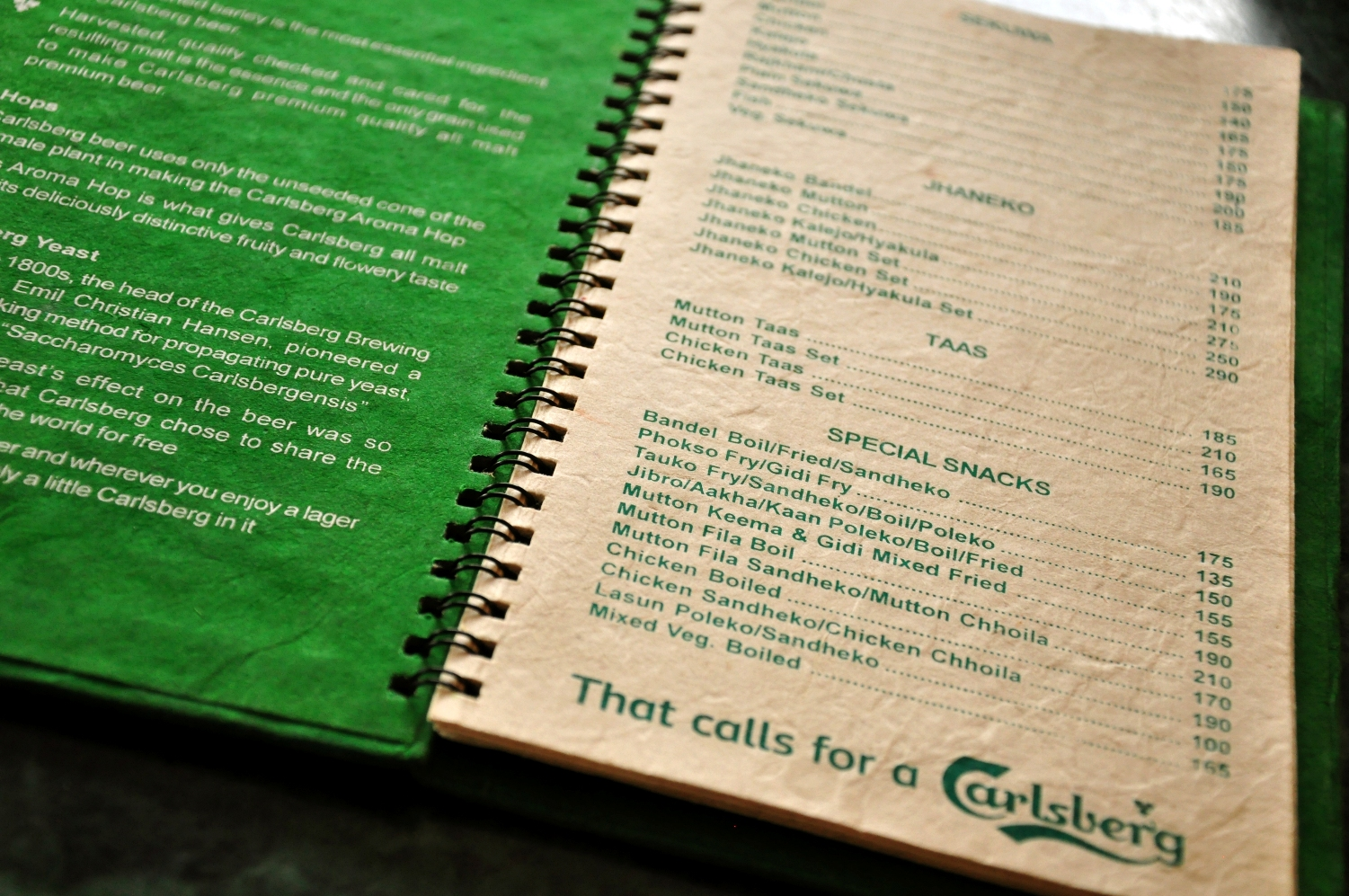
A menu of a typical Nepali restaurant made using Lokta Paper, also known as Nepali paper. It is a popular trend with Nepali restaurants using this paper for their restaurant menu.

== History ==
The earliest surviving lokta paper document appears in Nepal's National Archives in Kathmandu in the form of the sacred Buddhist text, the Karanya Buha Sutra. The Karanya Buha Sutra was written in Lichchhavi script and block printed on lokta paper and is estimated to be between 1,000 and 1,900 years old.

With the introduction of paper craft imports from Tibet in the 1930s, the production of handmade lokta paper began to decline. By the 1960s competition from commercially mass-produced paper from India placed the Nepalese handmade paper industry in a state of terminal decline with only a few families in Baglung and neighboring Parbat District retaining the traditional knowledge of handmade lokta paper production.

In the 1970s interest in rejuvenating lokta craft paper making occurred as the tourism industry in Nepal began to grow. Moreover, an effective conservation program was started in 1970 for the development of national parks and wildlife reserves in Nepal to provide raw materials for the development of forest based industries such as the production of lokta paper.

In the 1980s the United Nations Children's Fund (UNICEF) and the Agricultural Development Bank of Nepal/Small Farmer Development Program (ADBN/SFDP) launched the CDHP (Community Development and Health Project) project to revive Nepal's indigenous paper making processes.

In the late 1980s and early 1990s, with the growth of the popularity of lokta paper on the rise, Nepalese social and environmental entrepreneurs sought out and developed international trading partners and the export market for handmade lokta paper was established. Today the handmade paper industry in Nepal is growing at a rate of 15% per year.

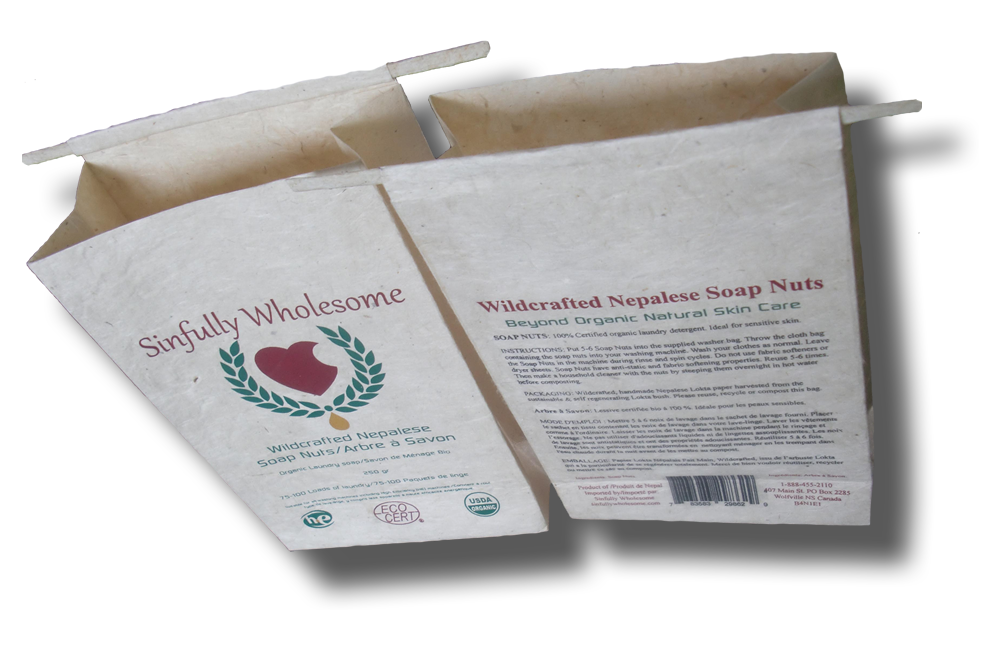
Handmade lokta paper packaging containing another Nepalese forest product export, Sapindus (Soap Nuts)

Once produced, lokta paper can last for several millennia (ca. 2000–3500 years).

== Paper making process ==
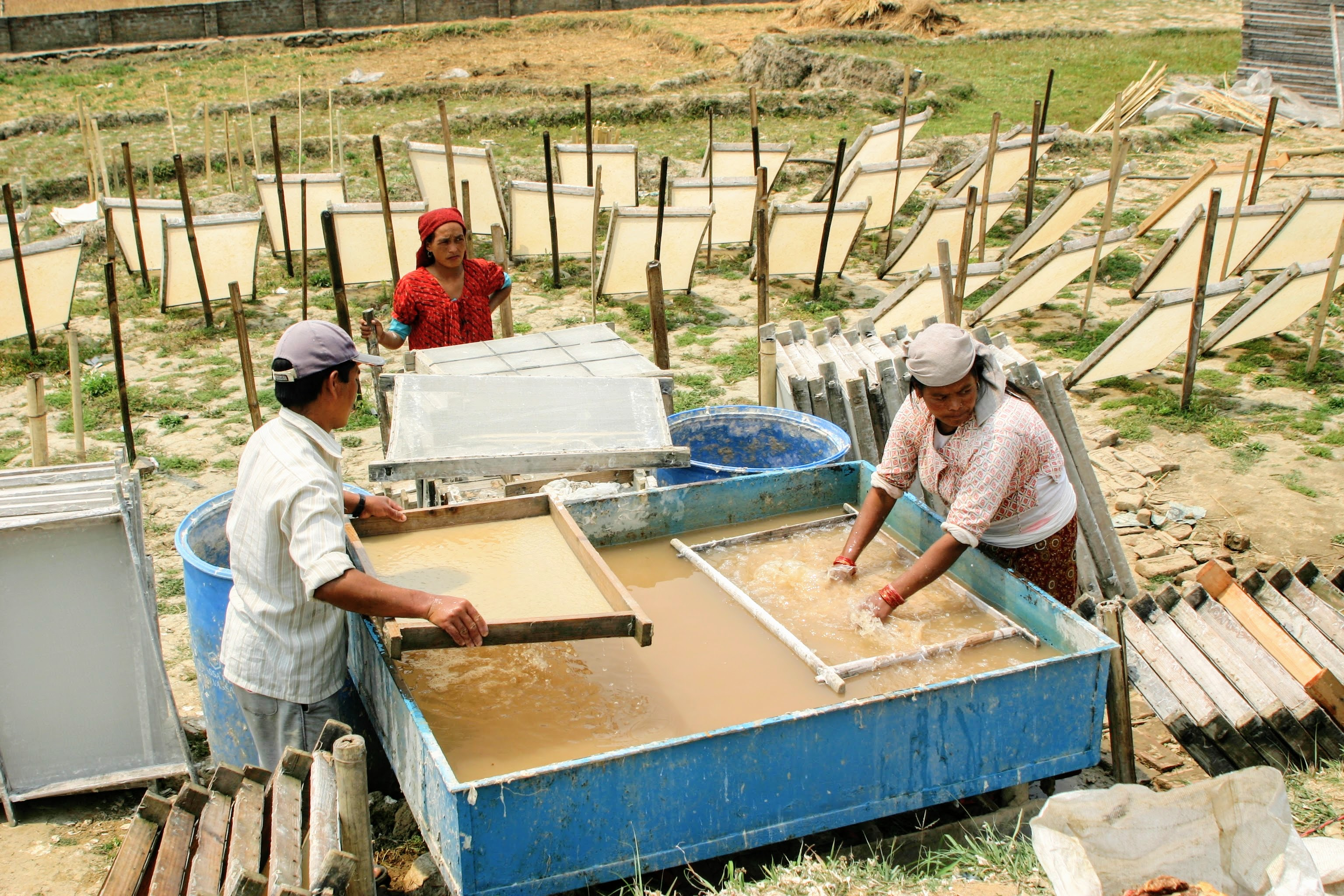
Manufacturing of lokta paper, Kathmandu

Lokta paper production is a forest–based industry. It relies as much on a ready supply of Daphne bark as it does on the skills of traditional paper makers and block printers, and on markets for end products. There are four main steps in manufacturing and marketing of lokta paper and lokta paper craft products:

- Harvesting the lokta bark
- Processing the paper pulp
- Producing craft products from the finished paper
- Marketing the final products.

== Social responsibility and environmental sustainability ==
Daphne shrubs are widespread at middle elevations across Nepal, covering more than million hectares of forest land spread across 55 districts; of these, 25 districts have an abundant supply. Like true laurel plants (Laurus nobilis) of Turkey and Syria, the Daphne shrub is one of the world's few underutilized species.

Lokta is a non-wood forest product (NWFP) harvested from protected areas (national parks, reserves, conservation areas) and is an important reservoir of biological resources maintained under in situ condition in the unique and diverse Himalayan ecosystems. When harvested, the lokta bush automatically regenerates to a fully grown 4–5 meter plant with in 5–7 years.

Women's involvement: The poor rural women of Nepal have traditionally been the principal forest users. Current economic conditions have reinforced the local employment of women, as many men are leaving the rural villages in search of employment.

The Cottage Industry Department of Nepal reports 377 registered handmade paper production industries, out of approximately 600 units operating in the country. Of these,175 manufacture about 30,000 metric tons of paper products each year. Yet, despite this major increase in handmade paper production in recent years, large scale lokta resources remain untapped. Handmade lokta–based craft paper products continue to offer considerable economic sustainability for poor rural Nepalese women due to their high–quality niche market potential.

== Modern uses ==
Although the traditional uses of lokta paper were largely restricted to government documents or religious texts, today lokta paper use is wide spread. Lokta paper is used for prayer flags, book bindings, restaurant menus, wallpaper wrapping paper to retain the potency of incense, spices and medicine, packaging, origami, and even dresses.

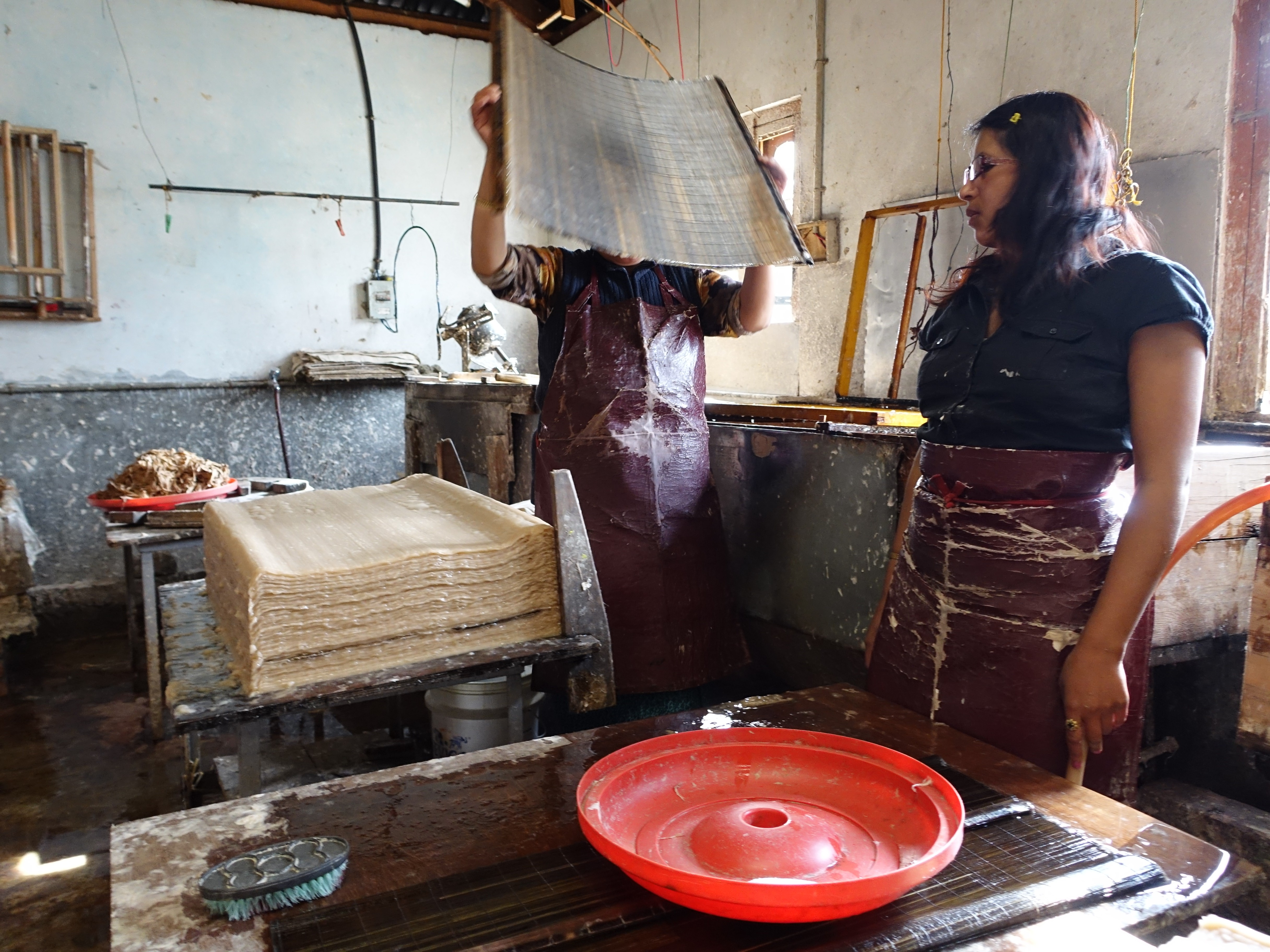
Paper factory in Thimphu

== Bhutanese paper ==
Bhutanese papermaking (daezo, shogzo) also relies on the inner bark of Himalayan Daphne shrubs, as well as Edgeworthia gardneri and Edgeworthia chrysantha. Resho (transl. cotton paper) is a thinner paper made with a cotton screen. Tsharsho (transl. bamboo paper) is thicker, made with a split bamboo screen.
