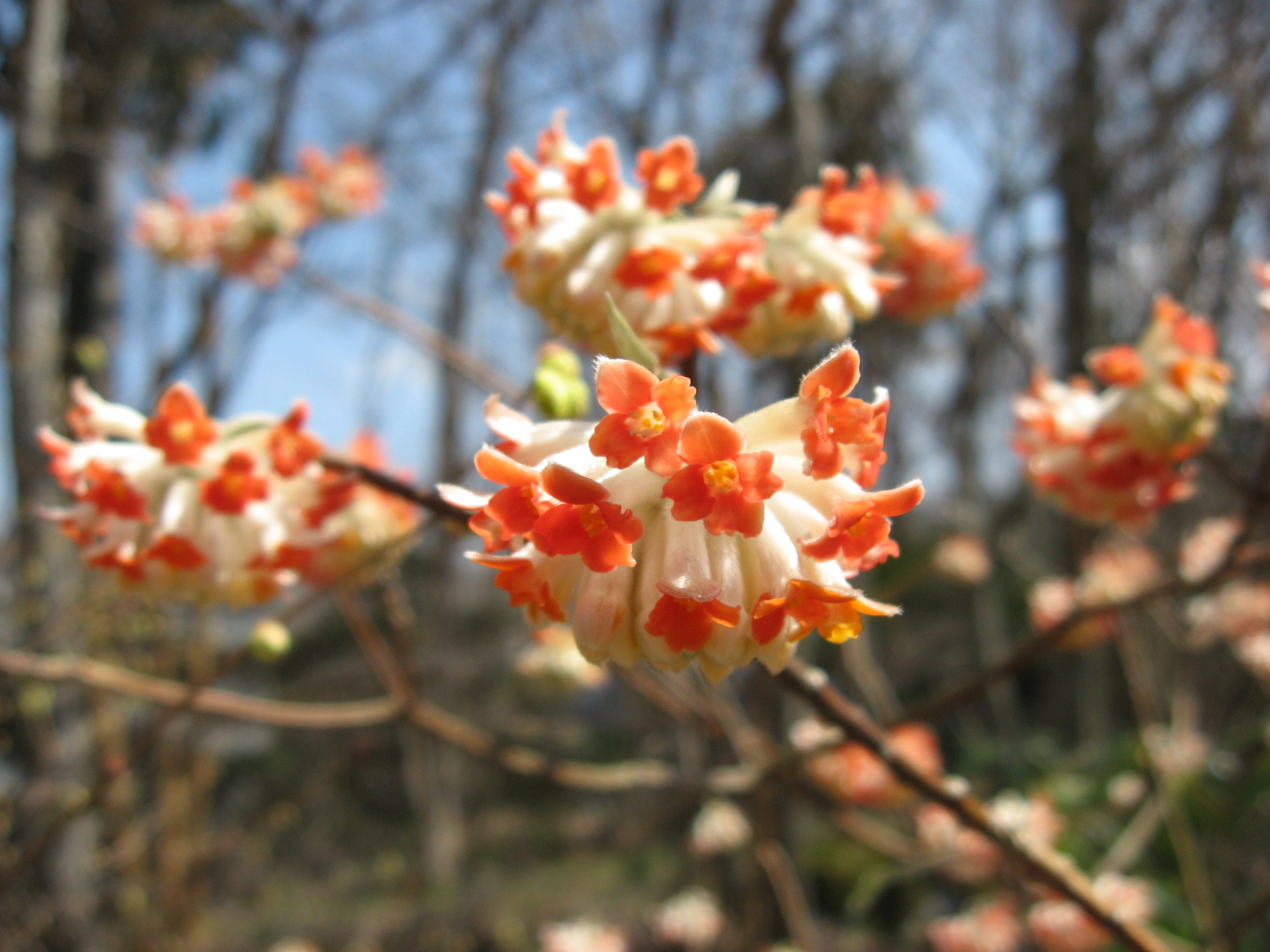
- E. chrysantha (synon. E. papyrifera, E. tomentosa)

Scientific classification
- Kingdom: Plantae
- Clade: Tracheophytes
- Clade: Angiosperms
- Clade: Eudicots
- Clade: Rosids
- Order: Malvales
- Family: Thymelaeaceae
- Subfamily: Thymelaeoideae
- Genus: Edgeworthia; Meisn.

Type species
- Edgeworthia gardneri

Species
- See text

= Edgeworthia =

Genus of flowering plants

Edgeworthia (paper bush) is a genus of plants in the family Thymelaeaceae. When the genus was first described, it was published twice in the same year (1841), in two separate publications: Plantarum vascularium genera: secundum ordines naturales digesta eorumque differentiae et affinitates tabulis diagnostacis expositae; and Denkschriften der Regensburgischen Botanischen Gesellschaft. The genus was named in honour of Michael Pakenham Edgeworth, an Irish botanist and official in the Bengal Civil Service, then stationed in India, and for his half-sister, writer Maria Edgeworth.

== Trichotomous branching ==
At least one member of the genus, Edgeworthia chrysantha, has the extremely unusual ability to branch trichotomously - the apical meristem forming the end of each stem splits into three sections at once, leading to its Japanese name mitsumata (三椏, three-fork). This trait is shared with no other known flowering plant.

== Species ==
Species list from both GRIN and ThePlantList

Image	Scientific name	Distribution
	Edgeworthia albiflora Nakai	Sichuan, China
	Edgeworthia chrysantha Lindl.	Myanmar, south and southwestern China
	Edgeworthia eriosolenoides K.M.Feng & S.C.Huang	SE Yunnan, China
	Edgeworthia gardneri (Wall.) Meisn.	Bhutan, India, N Myanmar, Nepal, China(E Xizang, NW Yunnan), Vietnam
	Edgeworthia longipes Lace	Myanmar, India
