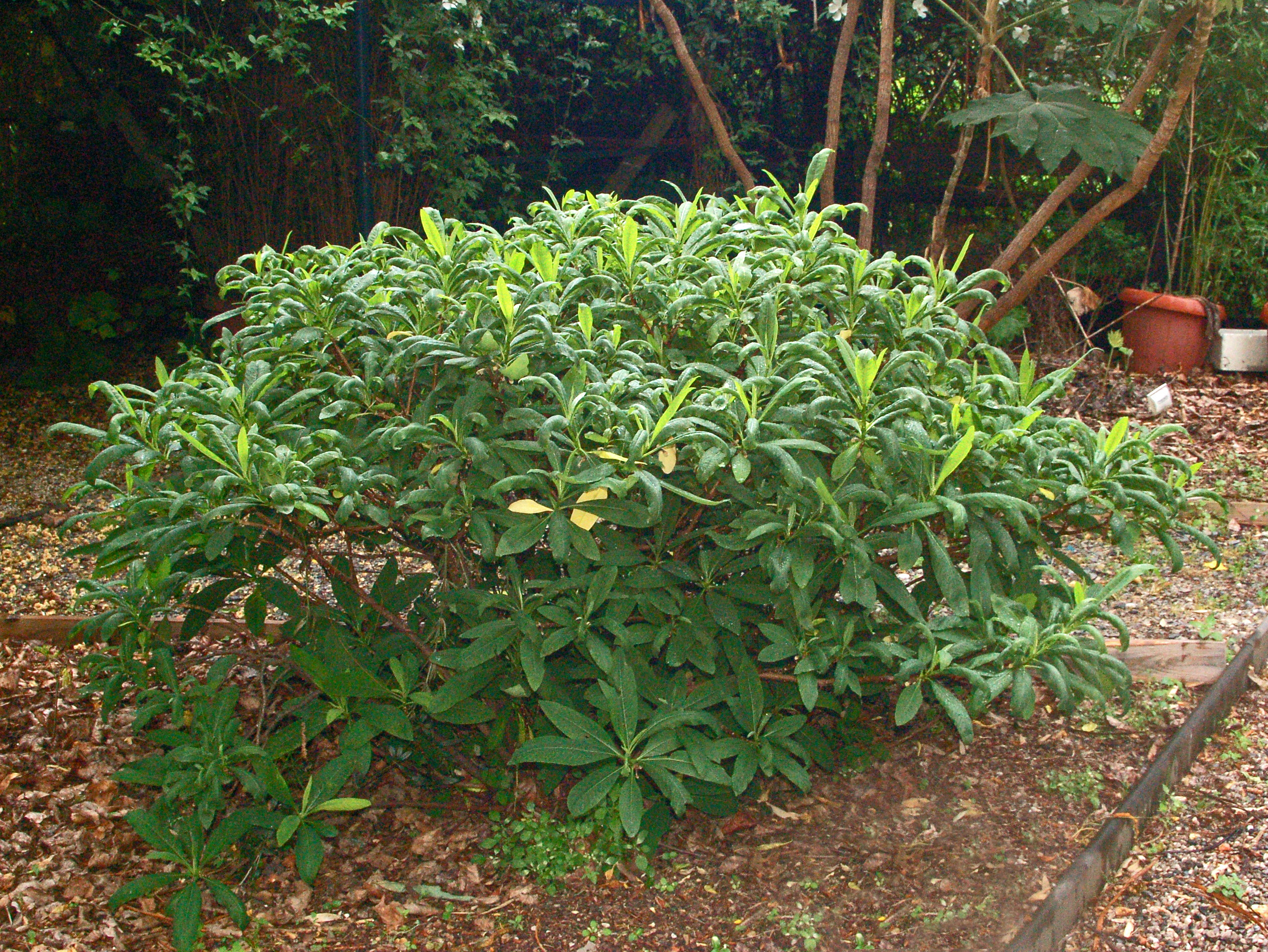
- Edgeworthia chrysantha at the botanical garden of Villa Durazzo-Pallavicini, Genoa

Scientific classification
- Kingdom: Plantae
- Clade: Tracheophytes
- Clade: Angiosperms
- Clade: Eudicots
- Clade: Rosids
- Order: Malvales
- Family: Thymelaeaceae
- Genus: Edgeworthia
- Species: E. chrysantha

Binomial name
- Edgeworthia chrysantha Lindl.

Synonyms
- Edgeworthia papyrifera Siebold & Zucc.; Edgeworthia tomentosa (Thunberg) Nakai

= Edgeworthia chrysantha =

Species of flowering plant

Edgeworthia chrysantha (common names: Oriental paperbush, mitsumata) is a plant in the family Thymelaeaceae.

== Etymology ==
The genus was named in honour of Michael Pakenham Edgeworth (1812–1881), an Irish-born Victorian era amateur botanist, who worked for the East India Company, and for his sister, writer Maria Edgeworth. The Latin specific epithet chrysantha is in reference to the plant's yellow flowers.

== Description ==
Edgeworthia chrysantha is a deciduous shrub with dark green, leathery, single, alternate, lanceolate leaves, 7.6–12.7 cm (3–5 in) long. It can reach a height of 1.2–1.8 m (4–6 ft). Flowers are yellow, have a sweet scent, and are in clusters at the branch tips. The flowering period extends from February to April.

== Distribution and habitat ==
This species is native to Myanmar and south-central and southeast China. It is naturalized in Japan. It grows in forests and shrubby slopes.

== Use ==
The bark fibres of these plants are used for making the handmade Japanese tissue called "mitsumata paper". Along with paper mulberry (kōzo) and gampi, it is used for making traditional Japanese paper (washi). Among other applications, mitsumata is used for banknotes as the paper is very durable. In China, flowers, roots and bark are used in traditional medicine. In Korea, the handmade paper is called "hanji" or Korean paper.

== Gallery ==
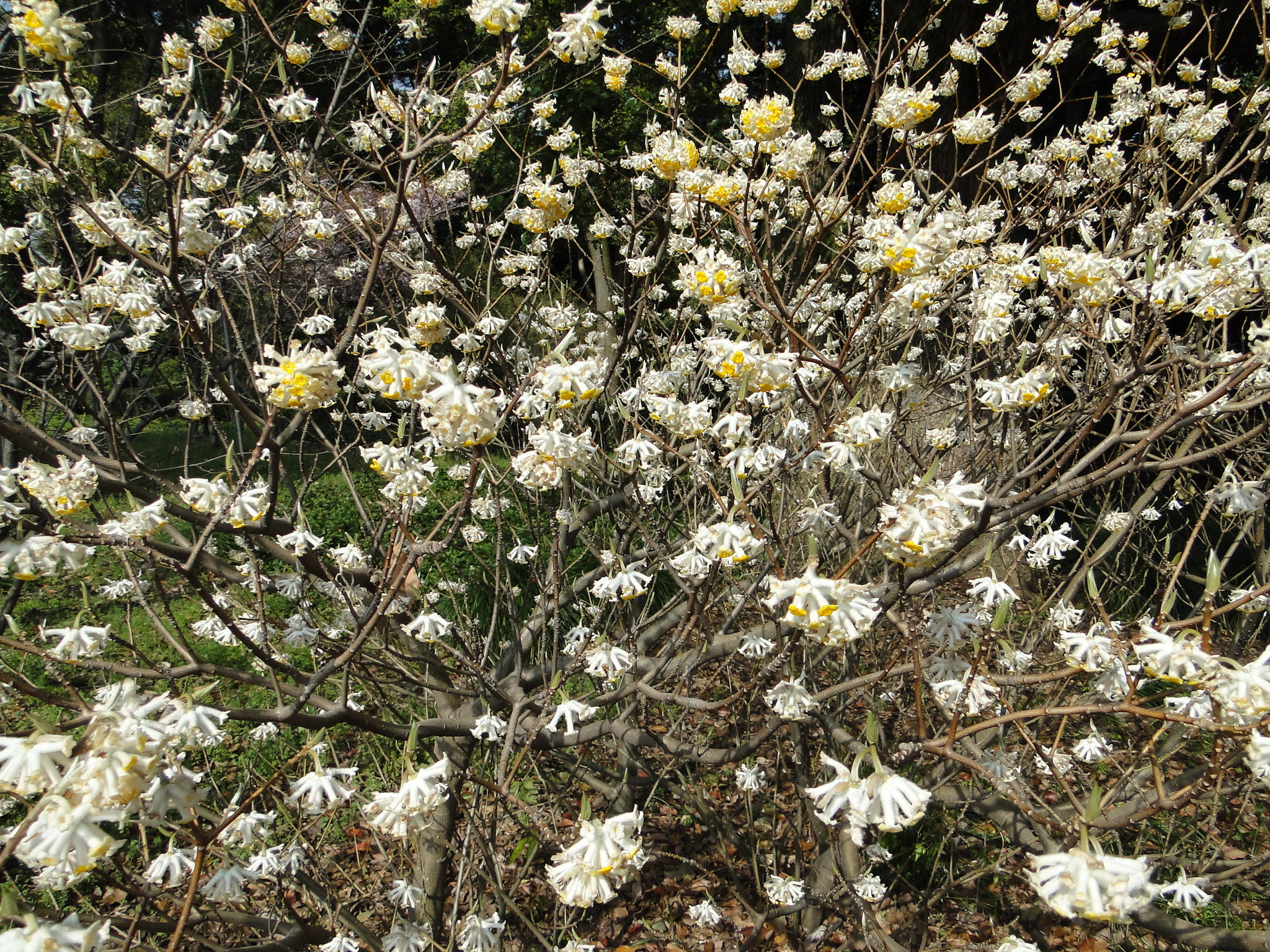
Edgeworthia chrysantha in flower, Imperial Palace gardens, Tokyo

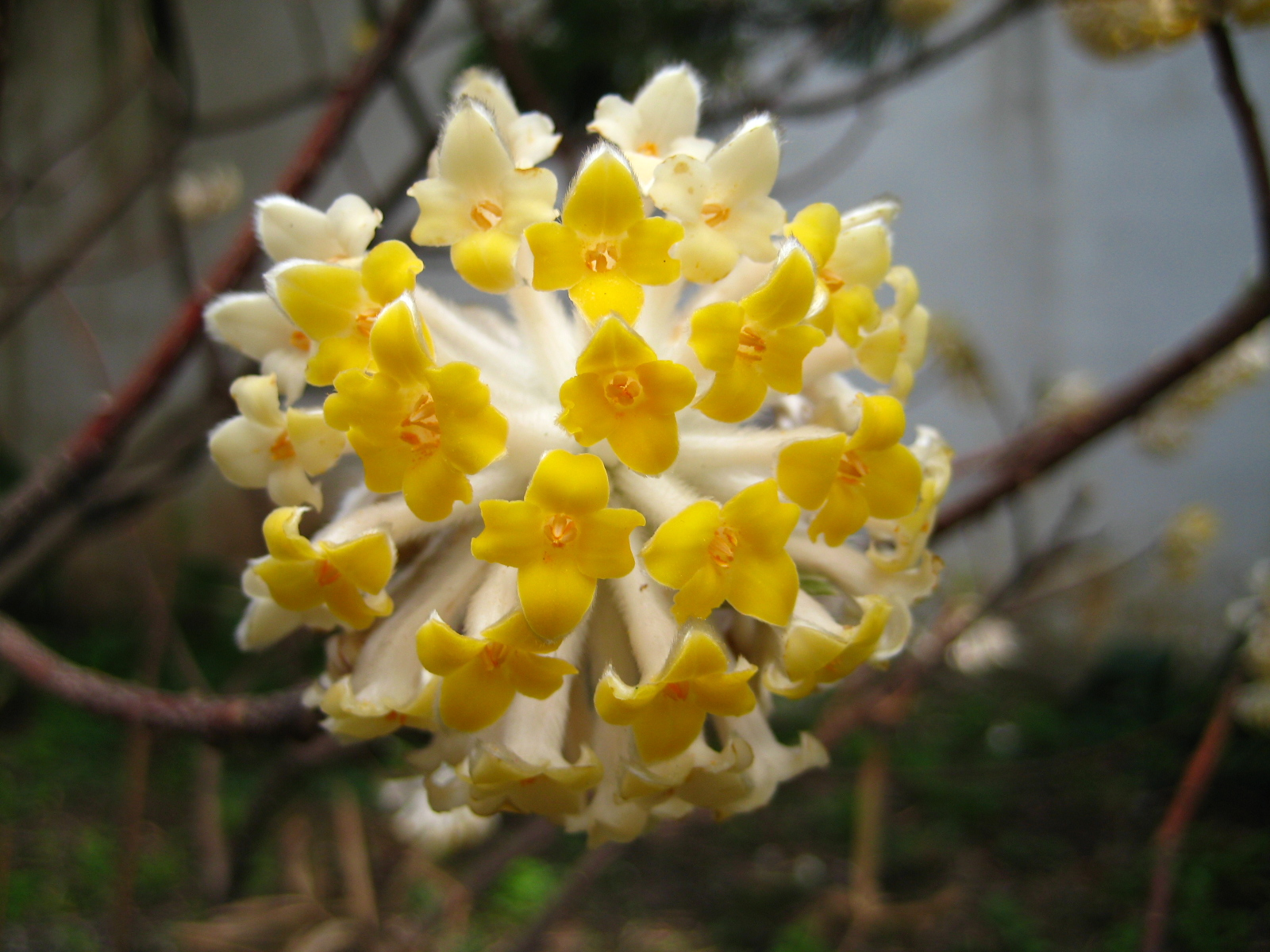
Close-up on flowers of Edgeworthia chrysantha, in Donglin Temple (Jiangxi), Jiujiang, China

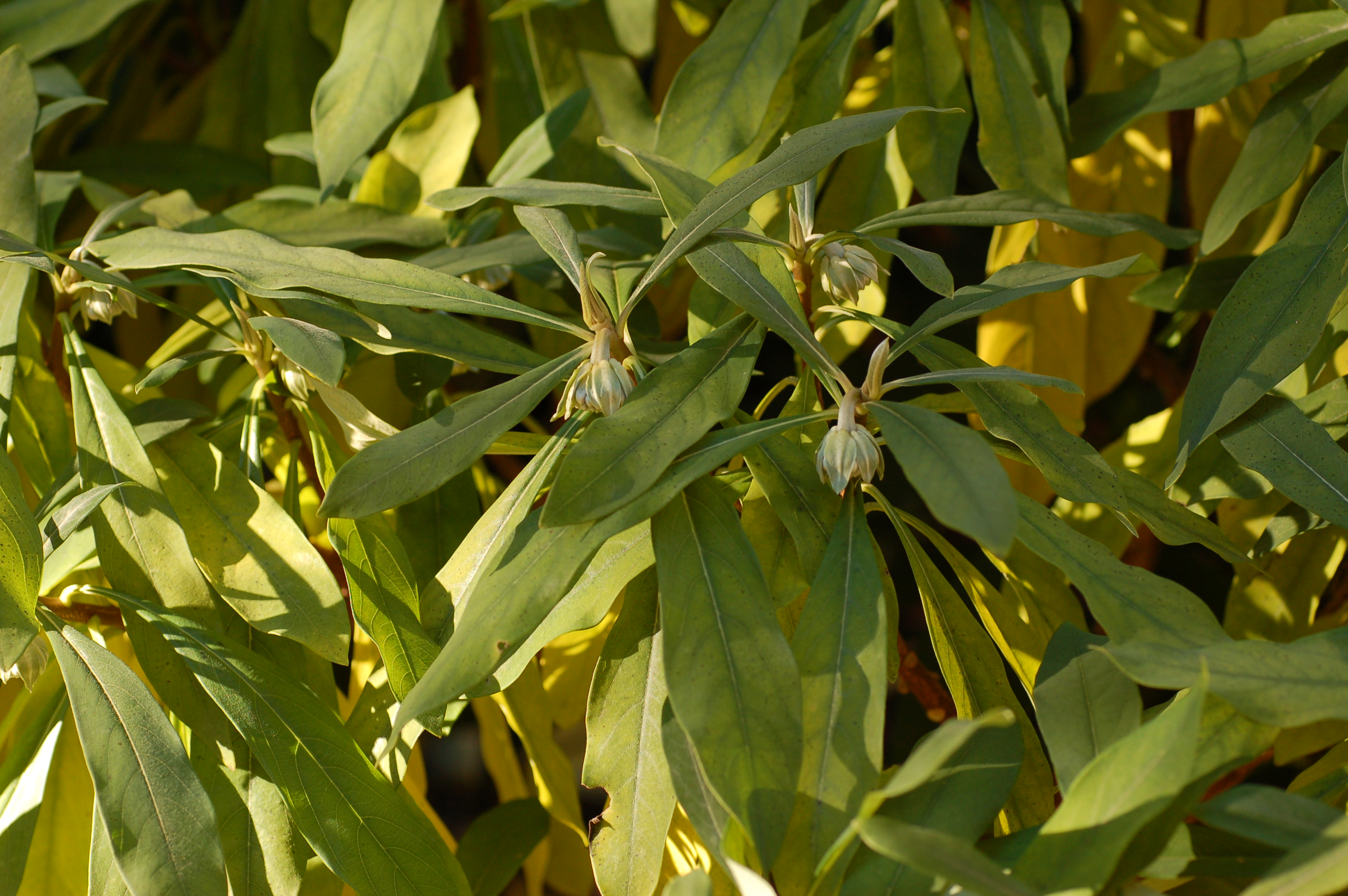
Leaves of Edgeworthia chrysantha

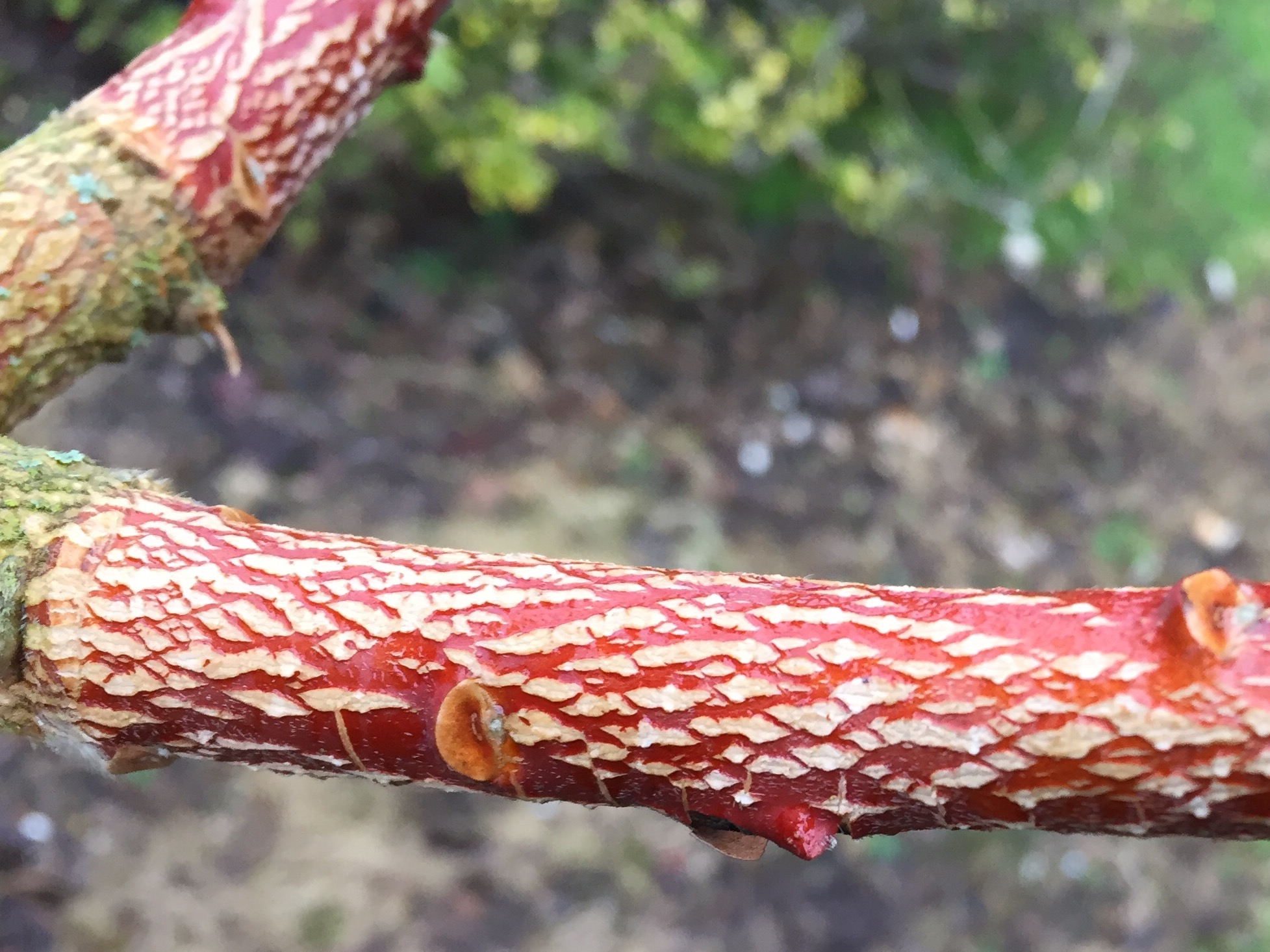
Attractive young bark of Edgeworthia chrysantha var. grandiflora
