= Hengul and Haital =

Medieval products of Assam used as paints

Hangool and haital are unique medieval products of Assam used as paints. Many of the manuscripts written in the medieval period contain paintings using hangool and haital. The pigments are still used to make items such as masks.

Hengul is vermilion, while haital is yellow arsenic.
