= Shaolinchiana lalashaniana =

Scientific classification
- Kingdom: Plantae
- Clade: Tracheophytes
- Clade: Angiosperms
- Clade: Eudicots
- Clade: Asterids
- Order: Gentianales
- Family: Rubiaceae
- Genus: Shaolinchiana
- Species: S. lalashaniana

Binomial name
- Shaolinchiana lalashaniana S.S.Ying (2022)

Genus of flowering plants

Shaolinchiana lalashaniana is a species of flowering plant in the family Rubiaceae. It is a subshrub endemic to Taiwan.
