= Shaolinchiana =

Scientific classification
- Kingdom: Plantae
- Clade: Tracheophytes
- Clade: Angiosperms
- Clade: Eudicots
- Clade: Asterids
- Order: Gentianales
- Family: Rubiaceae
- Genus: Shaolinchiana; S.S.Ying (2022)

Species
- Shaolinchiana lalashaniana S.S.Ying; Shaolinchiana taiwaniana S.S.Ying; Shaolinchiana tungyanshaniana S.S.Ying

Genus of flowering plants

Shaolinchiana is a genus of flowering plants in the family Rubiaceae. It includes three species which are endemic to Taiwan.

- Shaolinchiana lalashaniana S.S.Ying
- Shaolinchiana taiwaniana S.S.Ying
- Shaolinchiana tungyanshaniana S.S.Ying
