= Ōshima, Tokyo =

Ōshima 大島町
- Town
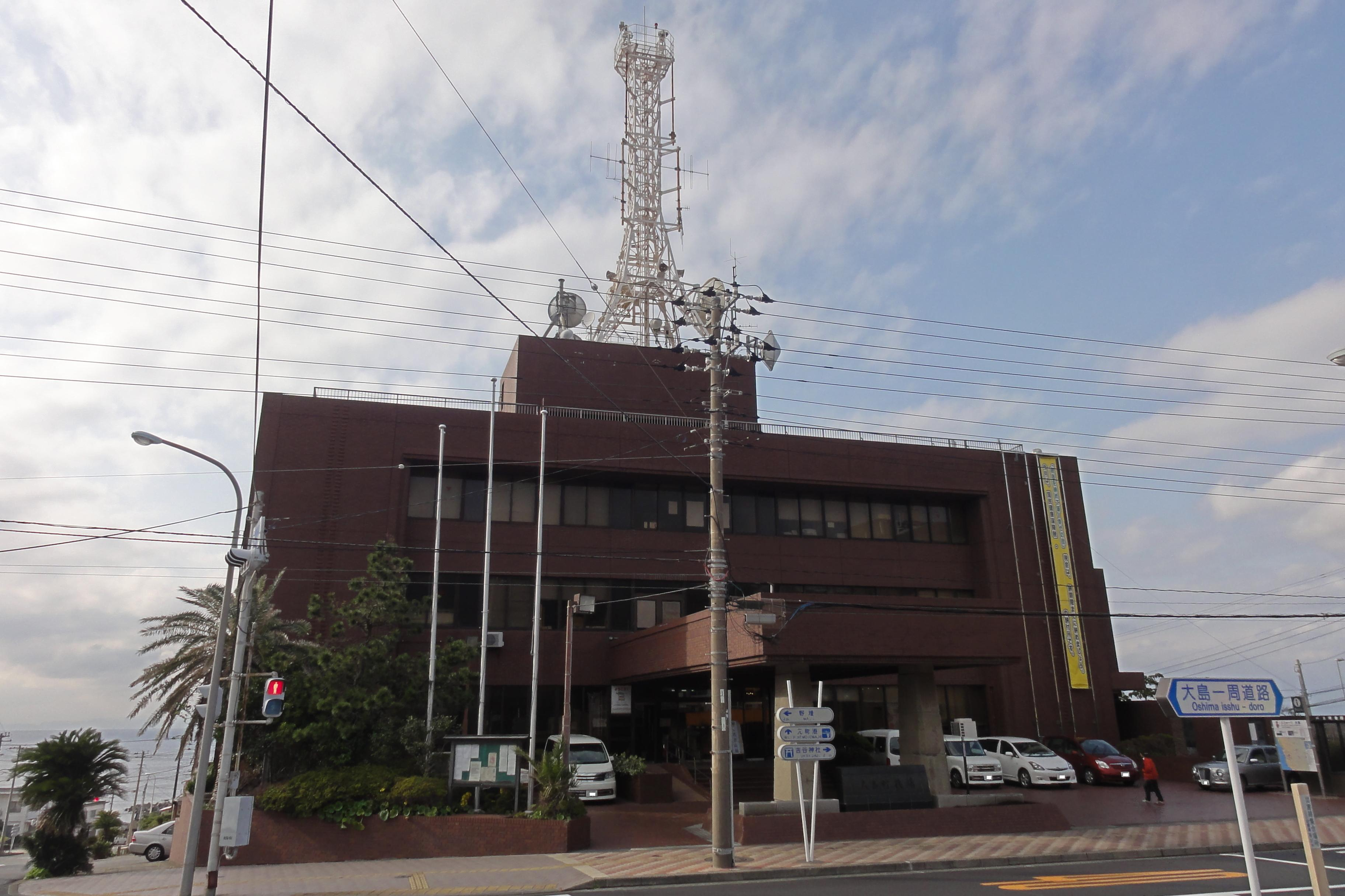
- Ōshima Town Hall

- Flag Seal

- Location of Ōshima in Tokyo Metropolis

- Ōshima (Kanto Area)
- Coordinates: 34°45′0.5″N 139°21′19.8″E
- Country: Japan
- Region: Kantō
- Prefecture: Tokyo Metropolis
- First official recorded: 620 AD
- Town settled: April 1, 1955

Government
  - Mayor: Chōichi Sakaue (from April 2023)

Area
  - Total: 90.76 km^{2} (35.04 sq mi)

Population (October 1, 2020)
  - Total: 7,102
  - Density: 78.3/km^{2} (203/sq mi)
- Time zone: UTC+9 (Japan Standard Time)
- Phone number: 04992-2-1443
- Address: 1-1-14 Motomachi, Ōshima-machi, Tokyo 100-0101
- Climate: Cfa
- Website: www.town.oshima.tokyo.jp
- Symbols
- Flower: Camellia japonica
- Tree: Camellia japonica

Ōshima (大島町, Ōshima-machi) is a town located in Ōshima Subprefecture, Tokyo Metropolis, Japan. As of 1 October 2020, the town had an estimated population of 7,102, and a population density of 78.3 persons per km^{2}. Its total area is 90.76 square kilometres (35.04 sq mi).

== Geography ==
Ōshima Town covers the island of Izu Ōshima, in the Izu archipelago in the Philippine Sea, 120 kilometres (75 mi) south of central Tokyo.

=== Climate ===
Climate data for Izu Ōshima (1991−2020 normals, extremes 1938−present)
| Month | Jan | Feb | Mar | Apr | May | Jun | Jul | Aug | Sep | Oct | Nov | Dec | Year |
|---|---|---|---|---|---|---|---|---|---|---|---|---|---|
| Record high °C (°F) | 20.9 (69.6) | 21.0 (69.8) | 23.1 (73.6) | 25.5 (77.9) | 28.4 (83.1) | 32.3 (90.1) | 34.4 (93.9) | 35.9 (96.6) | 33.7 (92.7) | 29.9 (85.8) | 25.1 (77.2) | 23.1 (73.6) | 35.9 (96.6) |
| Mean maximum °C (°F) | 16.4 (61.5) | 17.5 (63.5) | 19.7 (67.5) | 22.7 (72.9) | 25.8 (78.4) | 28.6 (83.5) | 31.7 (89.1) | 32.3 (90.1) | 30.9 (87.6) | 27.1 (80.8) | 22.7 (72.9) | 19.2 (66.6) | 32.7 (90.9) |
| Mean daily maximum °C (°F) | 11.0 (51.8) | 11.6 (52.9) | 14.2 (57.6) | 18.2 (64.8) | 21.9 (71.4) | 24.3 (75.7) | 27.8 (82.0) | 29.5 (85.1) | 26.7 (80.1) | 22.0 (71.6) | 17.8 (64.0) | 13.4 (56.1) | 19.9 (67.8) |
| Daily mean °C (°F) | 7.5 (45.5) | 7.8 (46.0) | 10.4 (50.7) | 14.4 (57.9) | 18.2 (64.8) | 21.0 (69.8) | 24.6 (76.3) | 26.0 (78.8) | 23.4 (74.1) | 18.9 (66.0) | 14.5 (58.1) | 10.0 (50.0) | 16.4 (61.5) |
| Mean daily minimum °C (°F) | 3.9 (39.0) | 4.0 (39.2) | 6.6 (43.9) | 10.7 (51.3) | 14.8 (58.6) | 18.4 (65.1) | 22.2 (72.0) | 23.5 (74.3) | 20.8 (69.4) | 16.1 (61.0) | 11.3 (52.3) | 6.5 (43.7) | 13.2 (55.8) |
| Mean minimum °C (°F) | −0.7 (30.7) | −0.9 (30.4) | 1.4 (34.5) | 4.9 (40.8) | 9.9 (49.8) | 14.2 (57.6) | 18.4 (65.1) | 19.9 (67.8) | 16.4 (61.5) | 11.4 (52.5) | 6.2 (43.2) | 1.0 (33.8) | −1.6 (29.1) |
| Record low °C (°F) | −3.3 (26.1) | −4.0 (24.8) | −1.9 (28.6) | 0.1 (32.2) | 6.4 (43.5) | 10.4 (50.7) | 12.4 (54.3) | 16.0 (60.8) | 12.4 (54.3) | 7.2 (45.0) | 3.0 (37.4) | −3.0 (26.6) | −4.0 (24.8) |
| Average precipitation mm (inches) | 137.3 (5.41) | 146.0 (5.75) | 238.4 (9.39) | 247.4 (9.74) | 256.5 (10.10) | 328.8 (12.94) | 255.9 (10.07) | 191.7 (7.55) | 341.3 (13.44) | 405.2 (15.95) | 192.8 (7.59) | 117.6 (4.63) | 2,858.9 (112.56) |
| Average snowfall cm (inches) | trace | 1 (0.4) | 0 (0) | 0 (0) | 0 (0) | 0 (0) | 0 (0) | 0 (0) | 0 (0) | 0 (0) | 0 (0) | 0 (0) | 2 (0.8) |
| Average precipitation days (≥ 1.0 mm) | 7.1 | 7.7 | 11.5 | 10.6 | 10.6 | 12.6 | 10.3 | 8.4 | 12.0 | 12.0 | 9.6 | 7.6 | 120 |
| Average snowy days | 0.2 | 0.3 | 0 | 0 | 0 | 0 | 0 | 0 | 0 | 0 | 0 | 0 | 0.5 |
| Average relative humidity (%) | 64 | 66 | 70 | 74 | 79 | 85 | 87 | 86 | 83 | 79 | 74 | 68 | 76 |
| Mean monthly sunshine hours | 153.7 | 145.4 | 158.1 | 174.2 | 179.7 | 125.1 | 150.8 | 190.1 | 141.0 | 131.4 | 140.3 | 147.6 | 1,837.2 |
Source: JMA

== Demographics ==
Per Japanese census data, the population of Ōshima has declined in recent decades.

Historical population
| Year | Pop. | ±% |
|---|---|---|
| 1980 | 10,734 | — |
| 1990 | 10,014 | −6.7% |
| 2000 | 9,224 | −7.9% |
| 2010 | 8,461 | −8.3% |
| 2020 | 7,102 | −16.1% |

== History ==
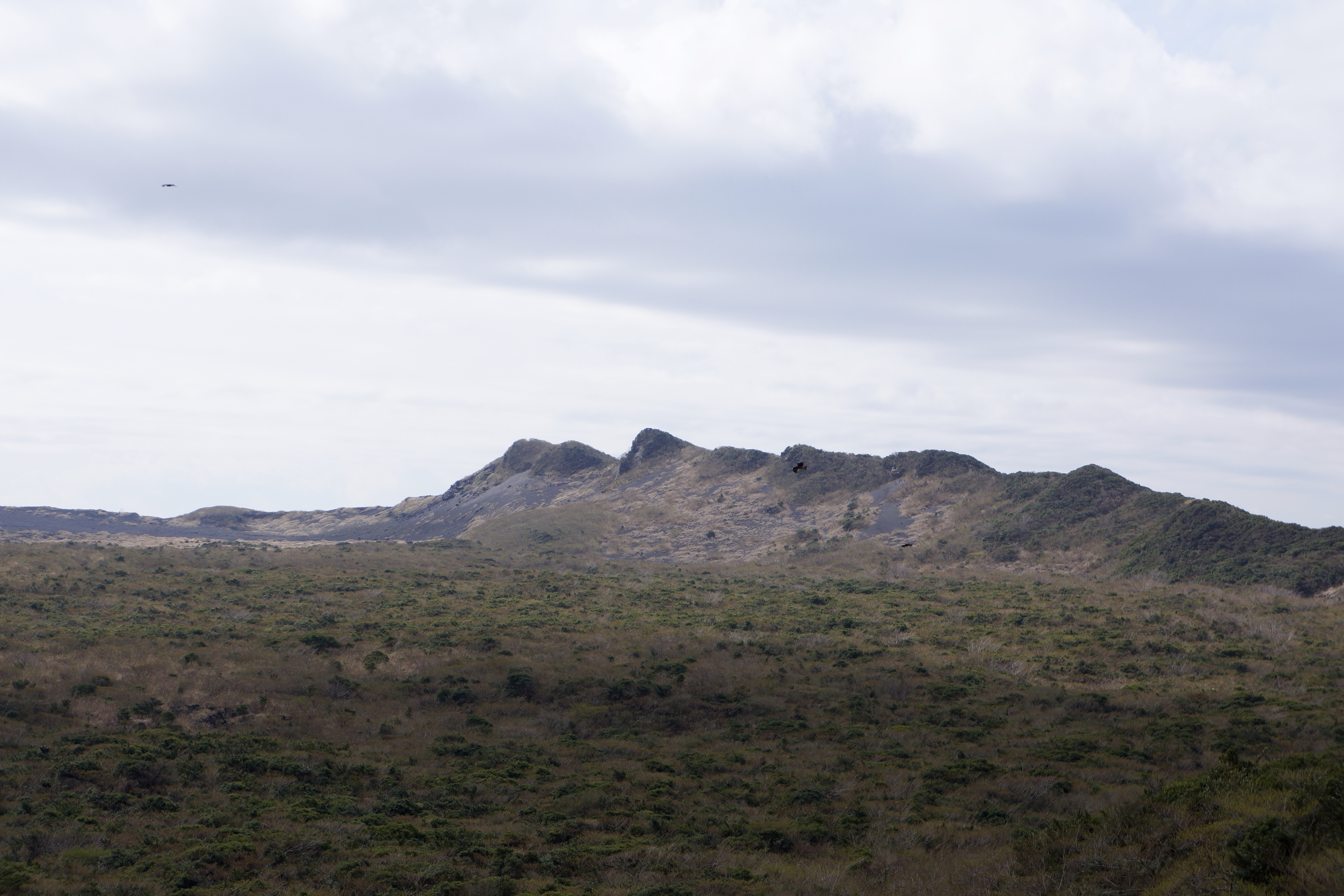
Panoramic view of Mount Mihara

It is uncertain when human settlement first began on Ōshima, but archaeological finds from the Jōmon period have been discovered, and the island is mention from early Nara period documents. It is mentioned in historical records for its many volcanic eruptions. After the start of the Meiji period, in 1878, the island came under the control of Tokyo-fu and was organized into six villages (Okada, Motomura, Senzu, Nomashi, Sashikiji and Habuminato) under Oshima subprefecture on April 1, 1908. The six villages were merged to form Ōshima Town on April 1, 1955.

In the mid-1930s, Izu Ōshima became a popular suicide destination after three schoolgirls jumped into the active volcano in the center of the island. In 1935 alone, more than 800 suicides were recorded.

The central volcano on the island, Mount Mihara erupted in 1965 and again in 1986, forcing the temporary evacuation of the inhabitants.

On 16 October 2013, Typhoon Wipha passed over the island, dropping 80 cm (31 in) of rain in 24 hours and causing a landslide that killed 35 people.

== Economy ==
Fishing and seasonal tourism are the mainstays of the economy of Ōshima.

== Transportation ==
=== Airport ===
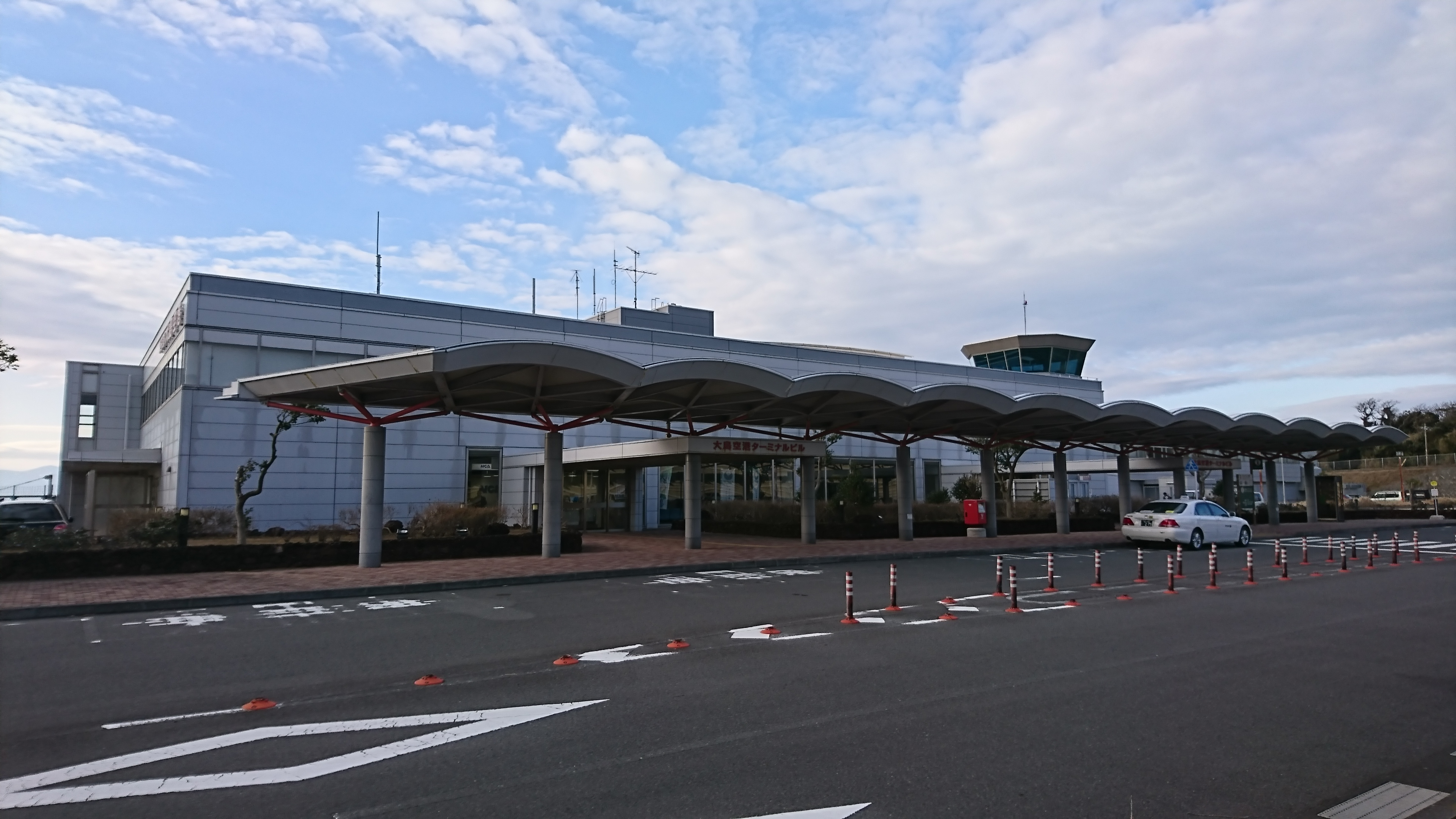
Ōshima Airport

- Ōshima Airport

=== Harbor ===
- Port of Okada
- Port of Motomachi

== Education ==
Ōshima town operates three public elementary schools and three public junior high schools.

Junior high schools:

- Dai-ichi (No. 1 or First) (大島町立第一中学校)
- Daini (No. 2 or Second) (大島町立第二中学校)
- Daisan (No. 3 or Third) (大島町立第三中学校)

Elementary schools:

- Sakura Elementary School (大島町立さくら小学校)
- Tsubaki Elementary School (大島町立つばき小学校)
- Tsutsuji Elementary School (大島町立つつじ小学校)

The Tokyo Metropolitan Board of Education operates two high schools in the municipality. Ōshima High School is an agriculture school known for producing baseball players, and Ōshima International Maritime Academy is a marine biology school. Ōshima High School is attended primarily by children native to the island. Ōshima International Maritime Academy draws students from mainland Tokyo and neighboring Izu in order to participate in its marine biology program.

== Sister cities ==
- Hilo, Hawaii, United States

== Local attractions ==
The island is known for its Camellia Festival, Hanabi Festival, five black sand beaches, and several onsen.
