= Tōkai Kisen =

Japanese shipping company

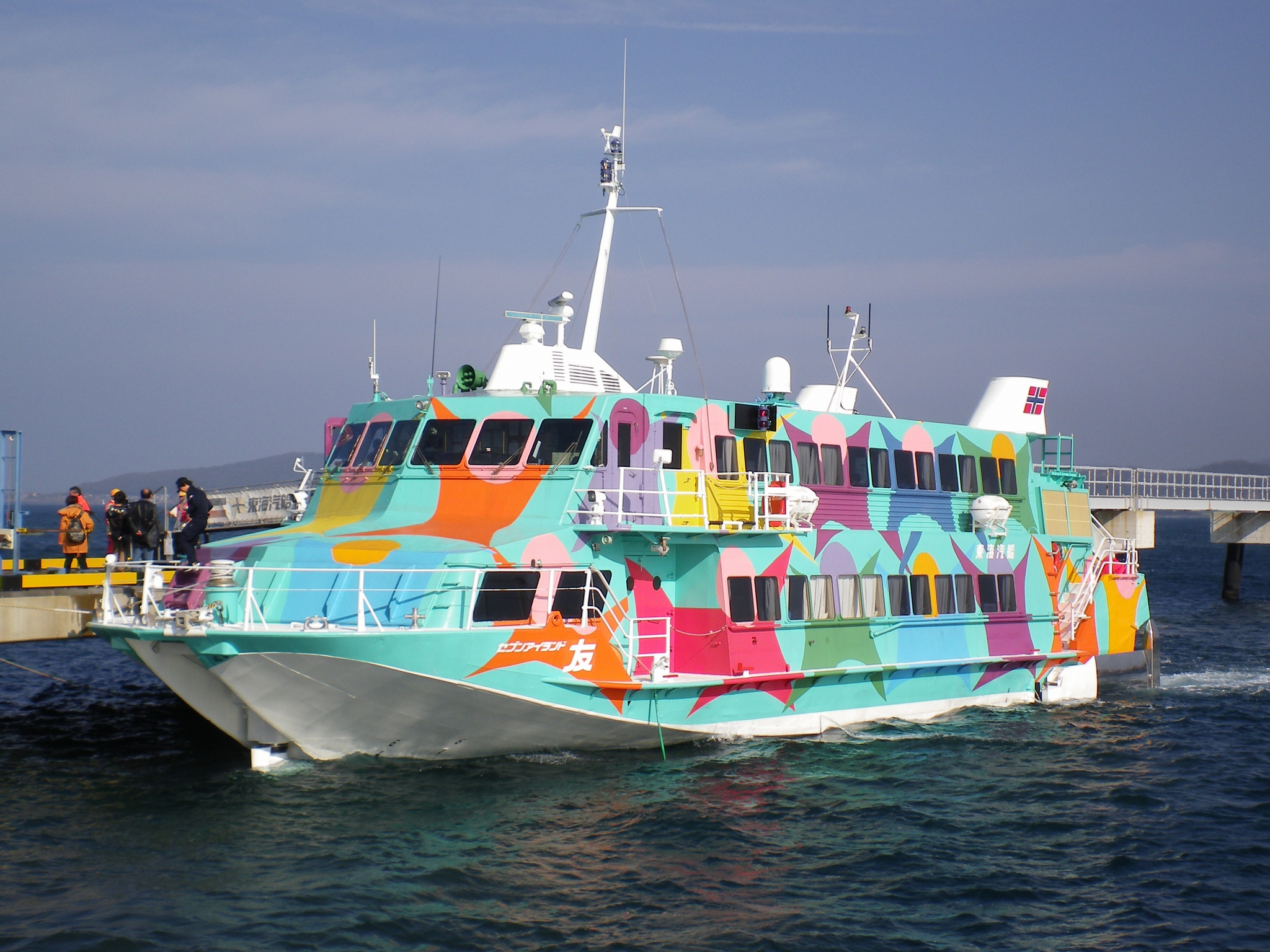
- Seven Islands/Tomo (Friend) Jetfoil, a hydrofoil
- Locale: Tokyo, Japan
- Waterway: Takeshiba, Oshima, Atami, Kozu-shiima, Shikine-jima, Nii-jima, Mikura-jima, Miyake-jima
- Transit type: ferry
- Operator: Tōkai Kisen
- No. of terminals: 8

Tōkai Kisen (Japanese: 東海汽船) is a shipping company headquartered in 1-16-1, Kaigan, Minato, Tokyo, Japan (〒105-6891 東京都港区海岸一丁目16番1号). Its main business is freight and passenger transportation between the main island of Honshu and the Izu Islands in the Pacific Ocean. The company is listed on the Second Floor of the Tokyo Stock Exchange.

== In general ==
Tōkai Kisen started its shipping business in 1889 as Tōkyo Bay Ships (Japanese: 東京湾汽船), combining four smaller shipping businesses, with twenty one ships and a total of 1.616 gross tons. In the following year, it was established as an incorporated company.

It soon added Hokkaido and Northeast Japan businesses, but later abandoned them. In 1942, it changed its name to the current name, Tōkai Kisen (Japanese: 東海汽船), which means East Sea Ships.

During the financially difficult time right after the Second World War, the company accepted investment from Fujita Kanko (Japanese: 藤田観光), one of the leaders in the hospitality industry, which has remained its largest shareholder with twenty percent of the company stock. It soon followed its expansion plans.

In 1969, Tōkai Kisen established Ogasawara Ocean Transport (Japanese: 小笠原海運), a joint business with Kinkai Yusen, but now a Nippon Yusen's subsidiary. In 1981, it established Seven-Islands-of-Izu Ocean Transport (Japanese: 伊豆七島海運). In 1988, Tokyo Vingt-et-Un Cruise (Japanese: 東京ヴァンテアンクルーズ) was added to the group. In 2003, it bought Ōshima Passenger Cars (Japanese: 大島旅客自動車), mainly a bus operator on Izu Ōshima.

In December 1986, Tōkai Kisen helped the evacuation of all residents of Izu Ōshima during the large-scale volcanic eruption of Mount Mihara, cancelling the company's all other lines.

Since 2003, the company has put a few high-speed Jetfoils into service for ferrying passengers to and from the Izu Islands. It also operates the Oshima Hot Spring Hotel (Japanese: 大島温泉ホテル) on Izu Oshima.

The company is listed on the Second Floor of the Tokyo Stock Exchange since 1949.

On 2 October 2026, the Kanto District Transport Bureau ordered Tōkai Kisen to suspend the use of three vessels for 20 days, from 9 to 28 October, following findings of alcohol-related safety violations and falsified inspection records. On 5 October, the company announced that president Junichi Yamazaki would resign as president and director effective 31 October, taking management responsibility for the incidents underlying the regulatory action, and that managing director Yoshinori Kurasaki would succeed him from 1 November. The company also announced voluntary returns of executive remuneration, including 80% of Yamazaki's monthly pay for one month.

== Gallery ==
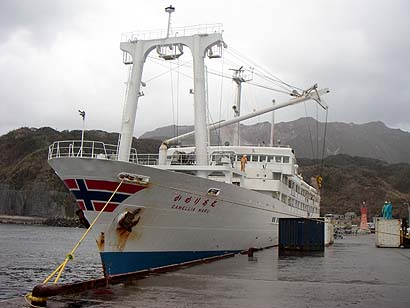
Camelia Maru

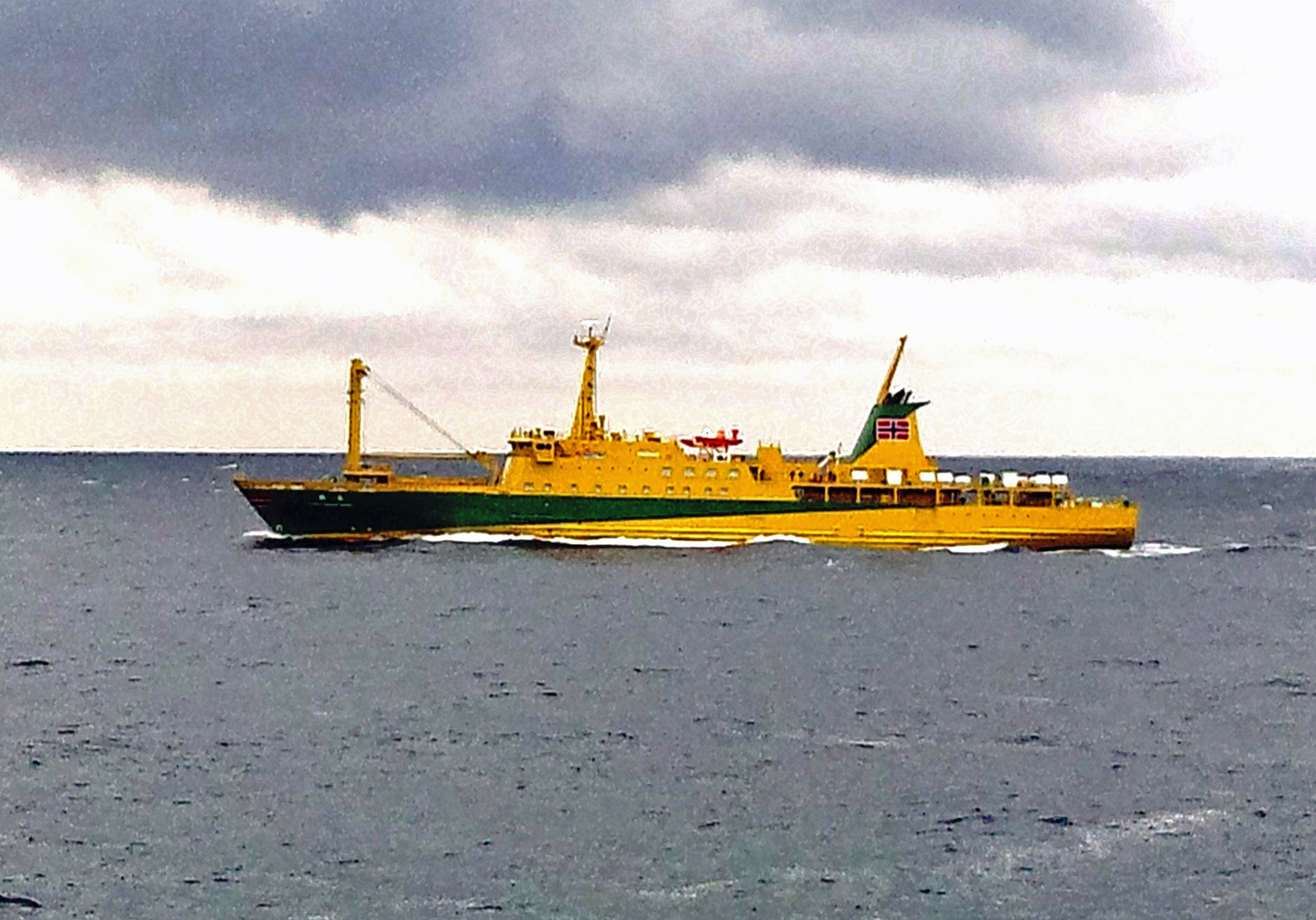
Tachibana Maru IIIrd

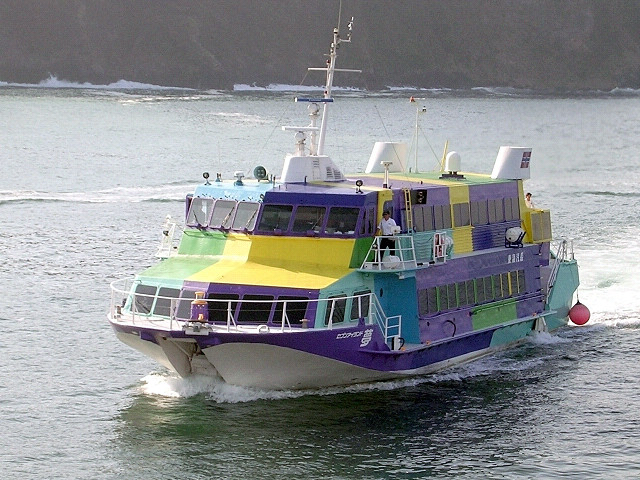
Seven Islands/Yume (Dream) Jetfoil, a hydrofoil

== Subsidiary companies ==
=== Oshima Bus ===
Oshima Bus
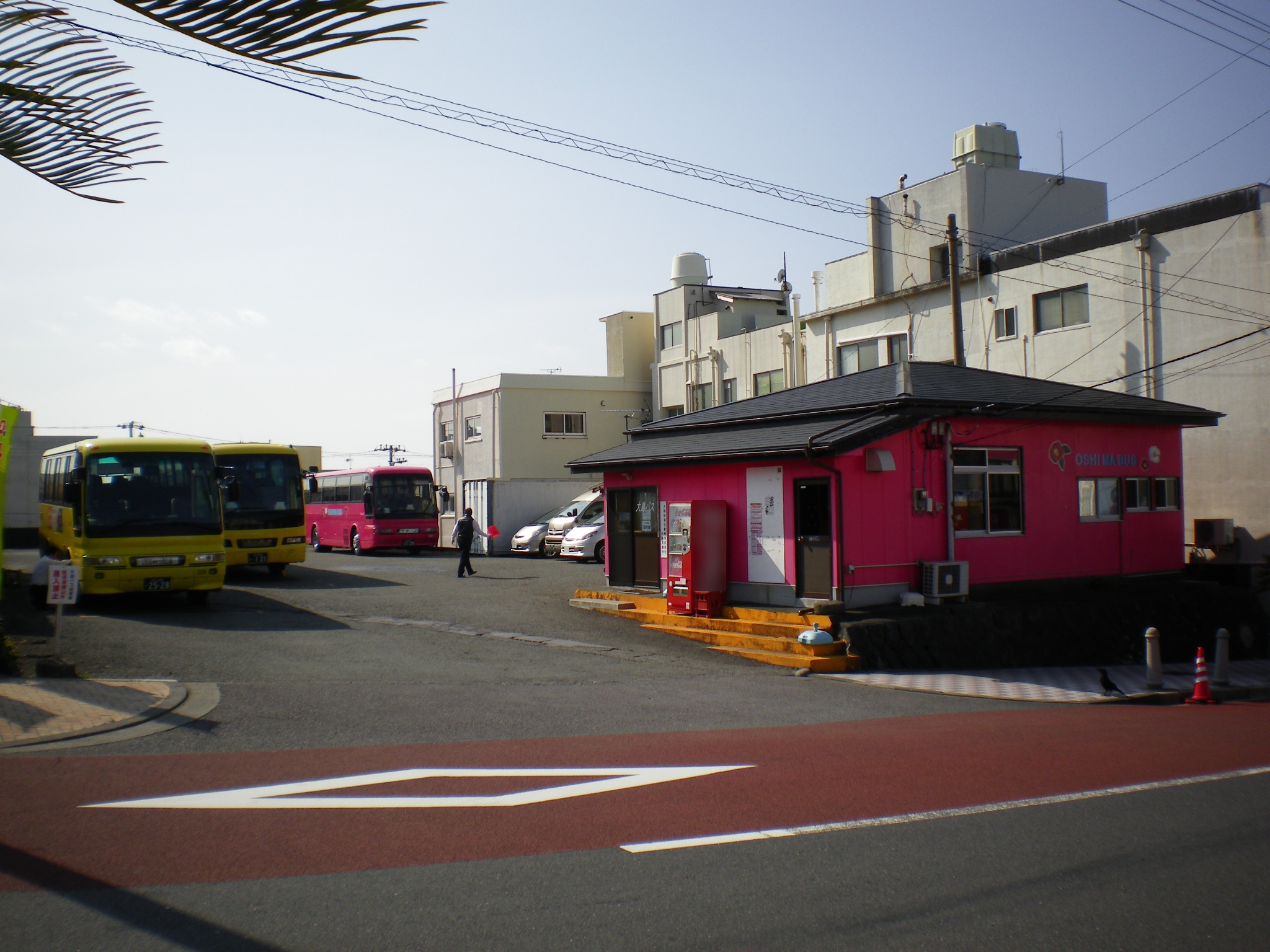
- Head quarter is located near Motomachi Port
- Parent: Tōkai Kisen
- Founded: 1 September 2003
- Headquarters: 1-9-6 Motomachi, Oshima, Tokyo, Japan (東京都大島町元町1丁目9番6号)
- Service area: tokyo
- Service type: Bus
- Routes: Route map
- Chief executive: Ryuji Ishikawa
- Website: Oshima Bus(in Japanese)

The Oshima Bus (大島旅客自動車株式会社, Oshima ryokaku jidosha Kabushiki gaisya) is a bus company, and it was invested by the Tōkai Kisen (Dowa Group), and established on 1 September 2003. Oshima Bus have a head office and barn that are located 1-9-6 Motomachi, Oshima, Tokyo, Japan.

=== Outline ===
This company was established in 1931 as Shimoda Car Corporation Oshima Office. On 11 November 1932, Tōkai Bus merged to Shimoda Car and then Oshima Office started to belong to Tokai Bus. In July 1933, Oshima Office was transferred to Oshima Car LLC. In July 1949, Tokai Kisen merged to Oshima Kaihatsu which was originated from Oshima Car. On 1 September 2003, a bus department demerged from Tokai Kisen and established Oshima BUs.

=== Offices ===
- Oshima Office

It is located near the company head office

- Tokyo Office

It is located in the head office of Tokai Kisen on 1-16-1, Kaigan, Minato, Tokyo

=== Bus route ===
All bus routes run on Oshima.

- There aren't services which run from Gojinka Onsen to Port of Motomachi. But there are services which run from Port of Motomachi to Gojinka Onsen when passengers implore drivers to stop at Gojinka Onsen.

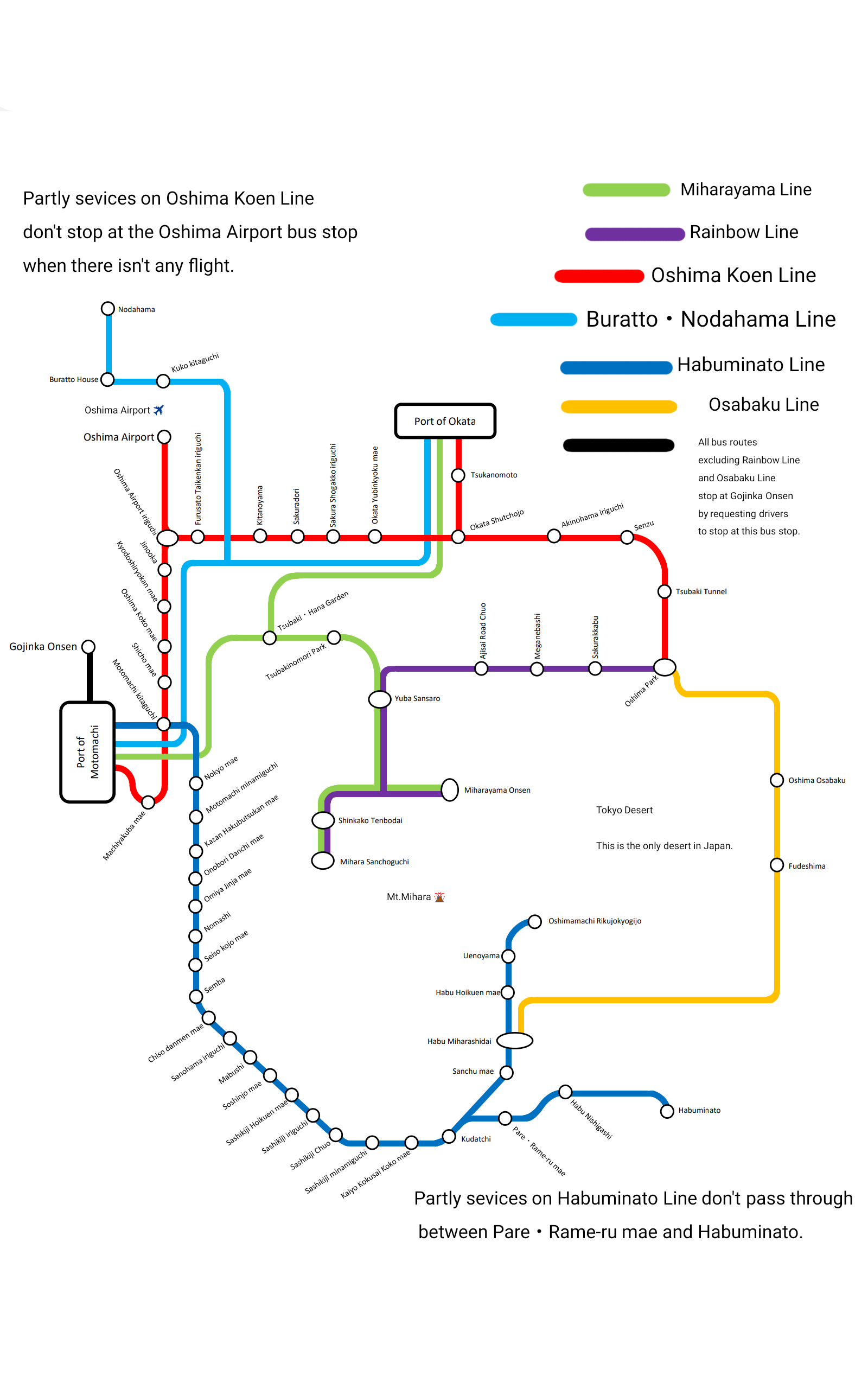
Bus routes of Oshima Bus

==== Rolling stocks ====
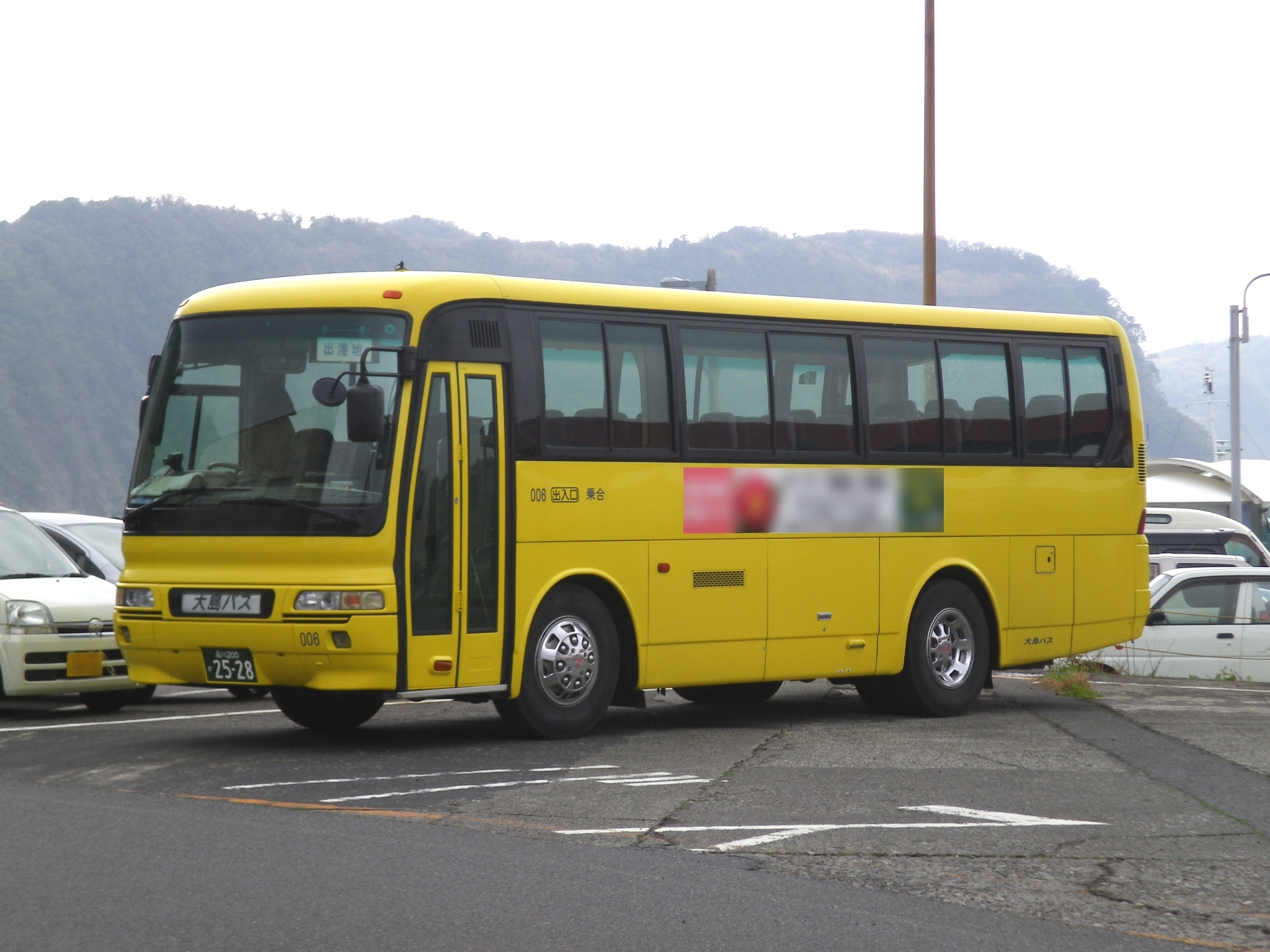
Mitsubishi Fuso Aero Bus at Okata Port
