= Beetle (JR Kyushu) =

Japanese high-speed ferry service

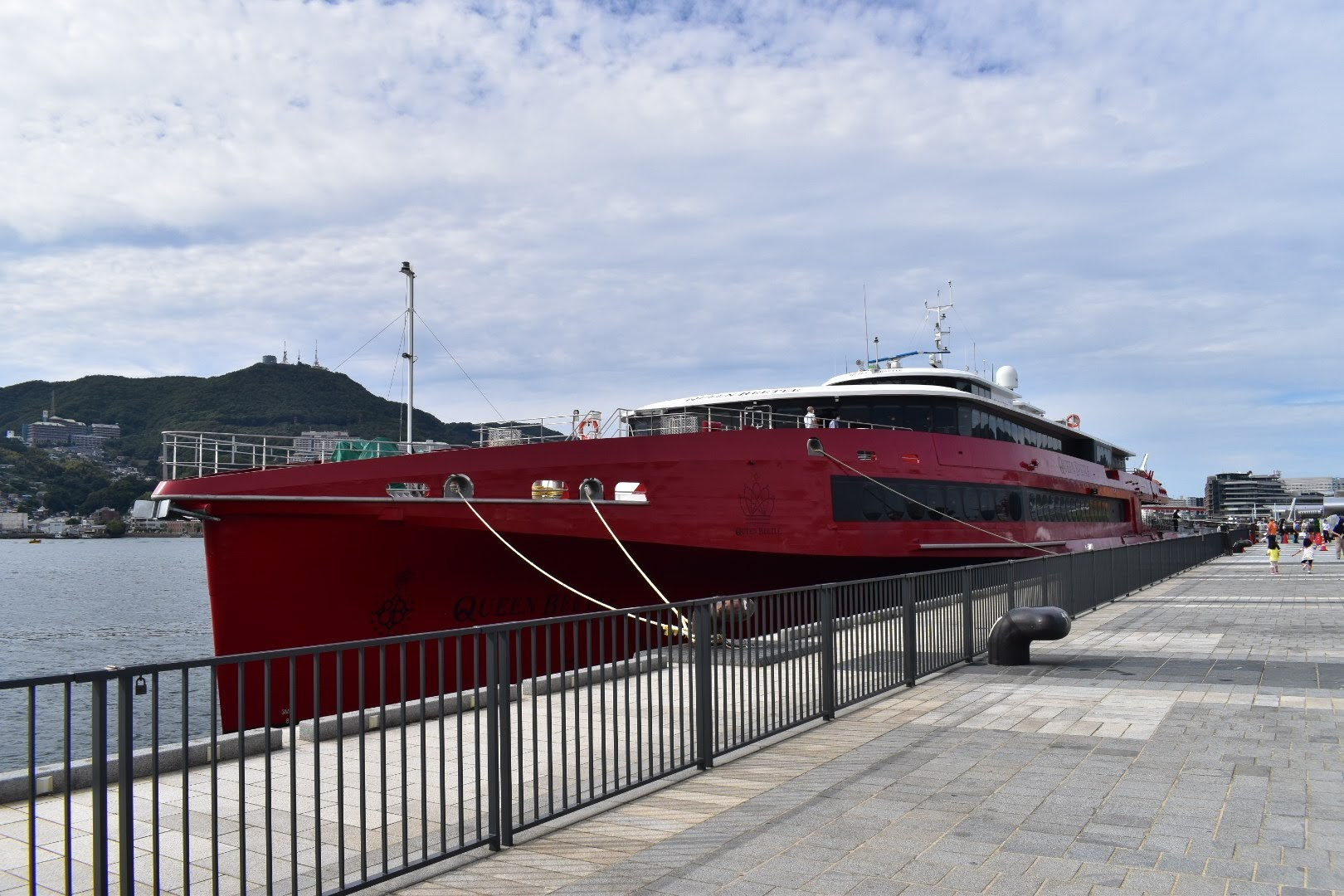
The Queen Beetle ferry in 2022

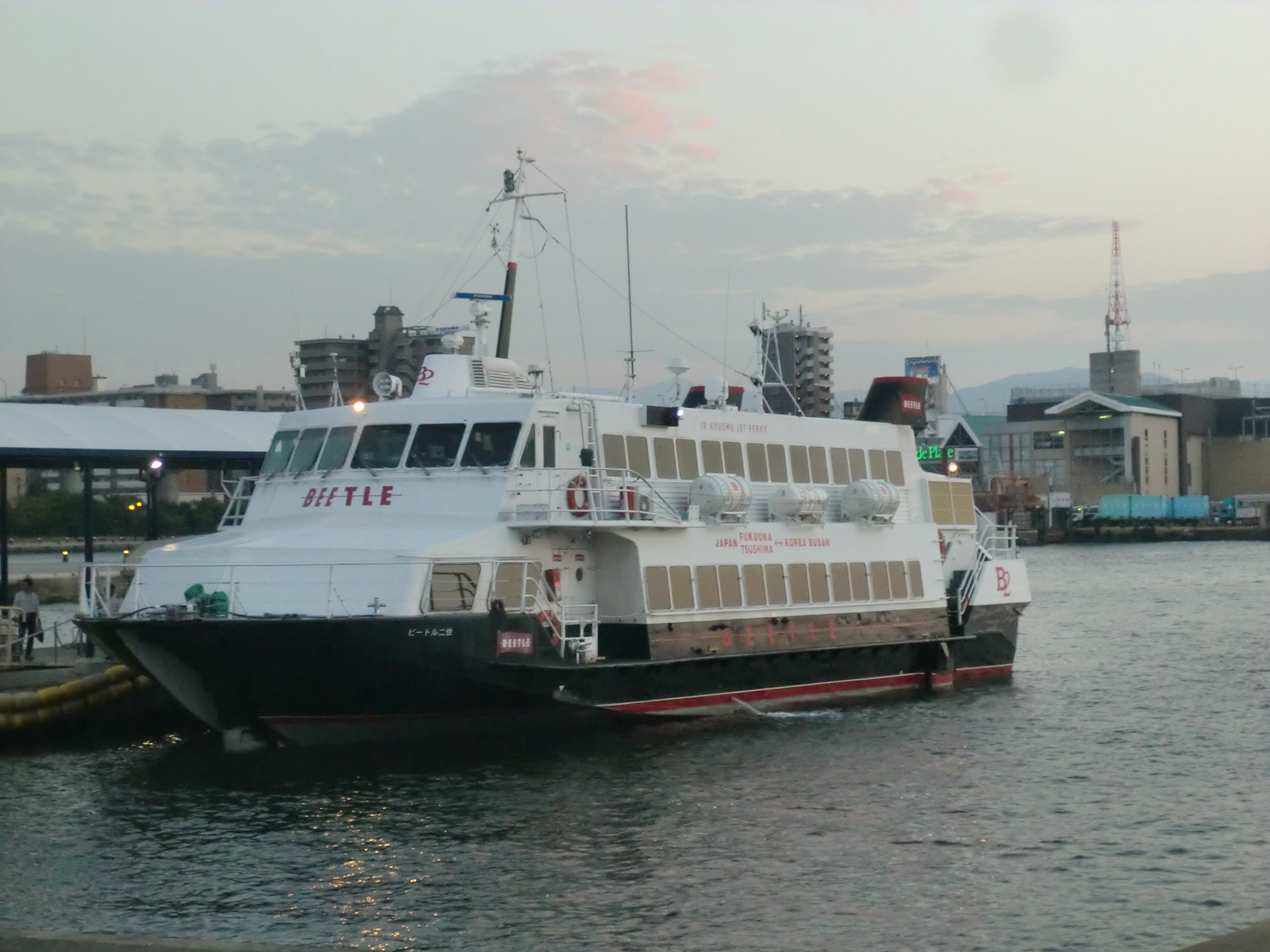
An original Beetle ferry in 2015

Beetle (ビートル, Bītoru) was a high-speed ferry service that travelled between Fukuoka, Japan and Busan, South Korea. It was operated by JR Kyushu Jet Ferry, a wholly owned subsidiary of Kyushu Railway Company (JR Kyushu).

The service was operated by hydrofoil ferries, the Boeing 929 Jetfoil, from its establishment in 1990. These hydrofoil ferries were later replaced by new trimaran ferries, the Queen Beetle (クイーンビートル, Kuīn Bītoru), built by Australian manufacturer Austal. The Queen Beetle first entered service in 2022, providing domestic trips between Okinoshima and Fukuoka during the COVID-19 pandemic. In November 2022 Queen Beetle started service on the Fukuoka to Busan route, while the older Beetle ferries were retired.

By the end of 2024, they announced that the service would be completely terminated, citing water seepage as a serious safety issue that they could not resolve.

== Closure ==
In August 2024, during the busy Obon holiday, the Queen Beetle abruptly suspended service following a surprise inspection by the Ministry of Land, Infrastructure, Transport and Tourism. The inspection found that JR Kyushu Jet Ferry falsified its logbook by operating the Queen Beetle between February and May of that year, despite knowing that the ship had a water seepage problem. An investigative panel assembled by JR Kyushu concluded that the cover-up was as the result of the ferry subsidiary prioritizing business interests.

The ferry issues resulted in the eventual dismissal of JR Kyushu Jet Ferry president Wataru Tanaka, while the salary of JR Kyushu president Yoji Furumiya was cut by 30 percent for two months.

Eventually, after postponing the planned resumption of service, JR Kyushu announced on 23 December 2024 that it would permanently end the ferry service, stating that it would be impossible to completely eliminate the risk of cracks occurring in the vessel’s structure. The JR Kyushu Jet Ferry company, which became independent from JR Kyushu in 2005, would also be liquidated after completion of investigation and subsequent actions.

== See also ==
- Kobee - A South Korean ferry line operated by Miraejet between Busan and Fukuoka, which also uses high-speed hydrofoil ferries (3 hours)
- New Camellia - A Japanese ferry line operated by Camellia Line between Fukuoka and Busan, offering both day and overnight services (6 - 12 hours)
- Pukhwan Ferry - A South Korean ferry line between Shimonoseki and Busan that offers daily overnight services (10-14 hours)
- Kampu Ferry - A Japanese ferry line between Shimonoseki and Busan that offers daily overnight services (10-14 hours)
- Hakata Port - It could be worth taking a look to see which other ferries often depart from Fukuoka
