= Boeing 929 Jetfoil =

Waterjet-propelled hydrofoil boat

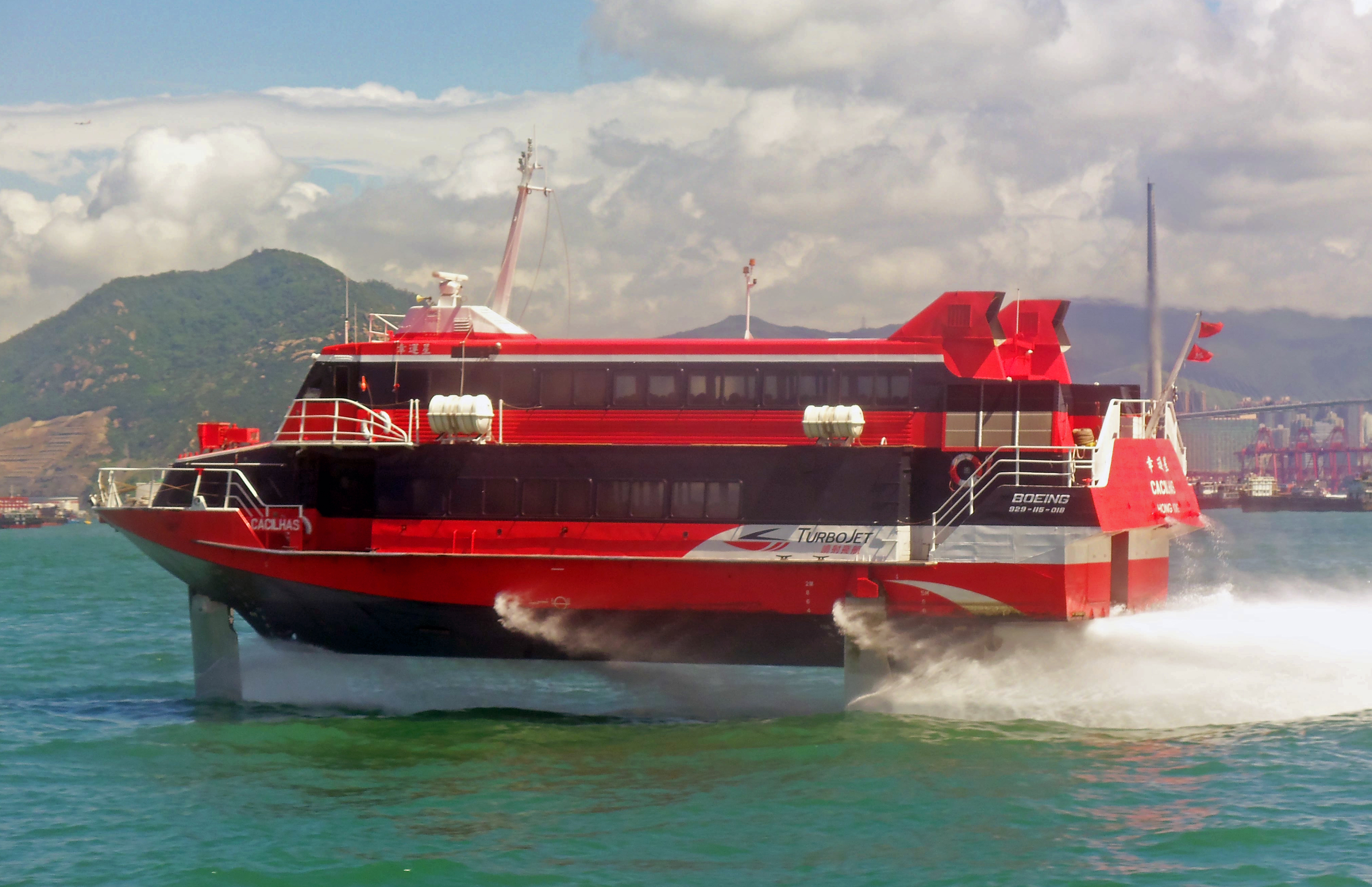
- Boeing 929-115-018 Cacilhas in Hong Kong's Victoria Harbour

Class overview
- Name: Boeing 929 Jetfoil
- Builders: Boeing Marine Systems; Kawasaki Heavy Industries; Shanghai Simno Marine
- Built: 1976 -
- Planned: 1
- Completed: 46

General characteristics
- Type: Passenger hydrofoil
- Displacement: 115 short tons (104 t)
- Length: 90 ft (27 m)
- Beam: 18 ft (5.5 m)
- Draft: 4.5 to 6.5 ft (1.4 to 2.0 m) (foilborne)
- Depth: 3.0 m (9 ft 10 in)
- Decks: 2
- Propulsion: 2x Rolls-Royce Allison 501-KF gas turbines
- Speed: 40 to 45 knots (74 to 83 km/h)
- Capacity: 250 to 350 passengers
- Crew: 4 to 8 crew
- Notes: 2150 L gas oil/h (consider the cruising distance per hour)

The Boeing 929 Jetfoil is a passenger-carrying, waterjet-propelled hydrofoil by Boeing.

Boeing adapted many systems used in jet aircraft for hydrofoils. Robert Bateman led development. Boeing launched its first passenger-carrying waterjet-propelled hydrofoil in April 1974. It could carry from 167 to 400 passengers. It was based on technology developed for the United States Navy patrol hydrofoil Tucumcari, and shared technology with the Pegasus-class military patrol hydrofoils. The product line was licensed to the Japanese company Kawasaki Heavy Industries.

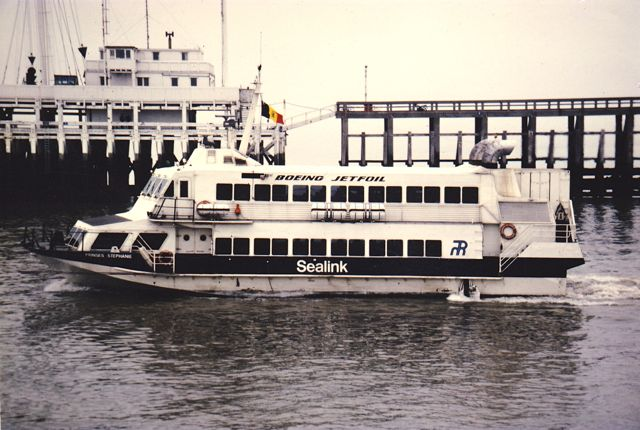
Jetfoil 929-115-020 Princesse Stephanie of RMT

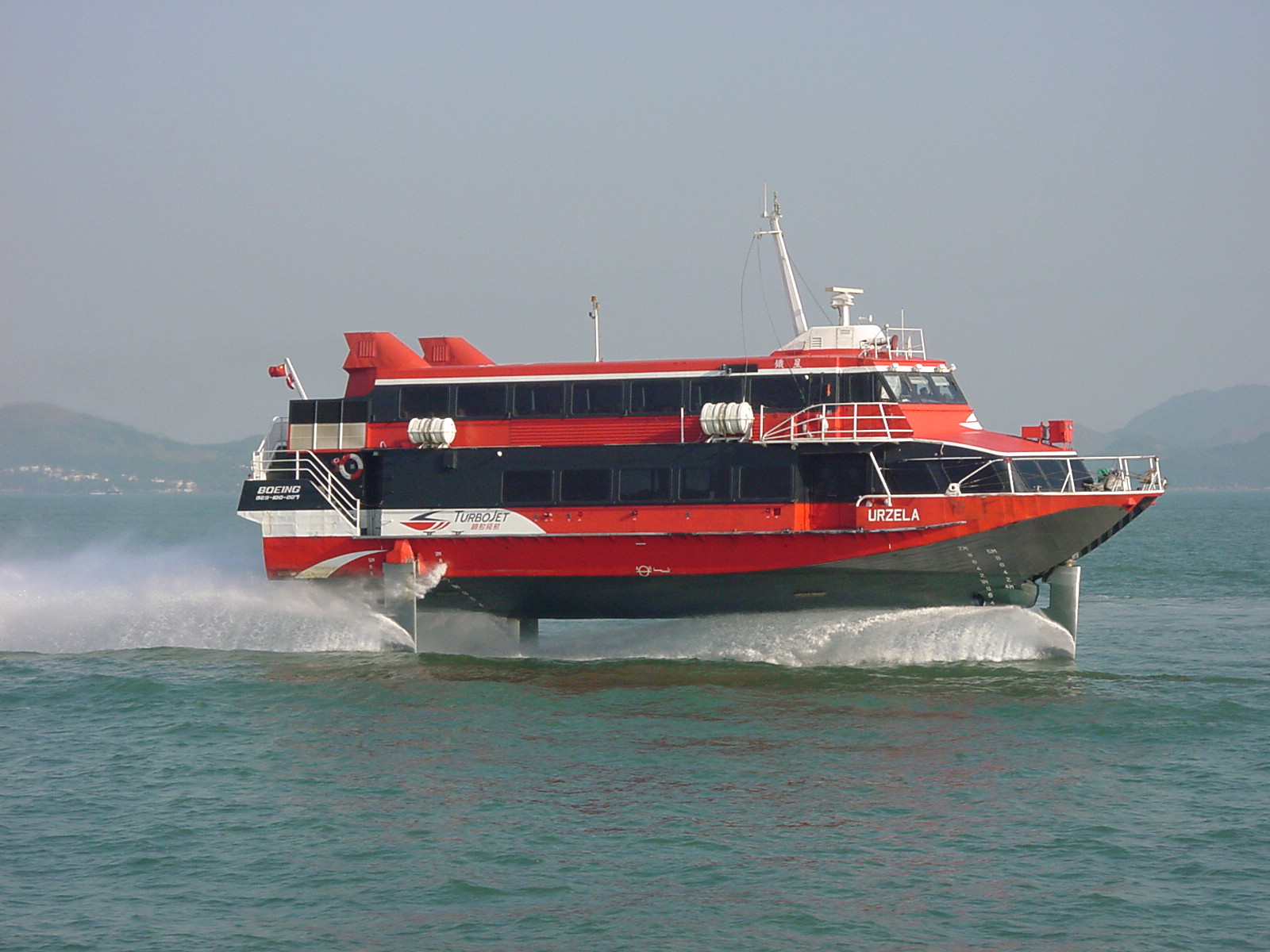
Jetfoil 929-100-007 Urzela of TurboJET

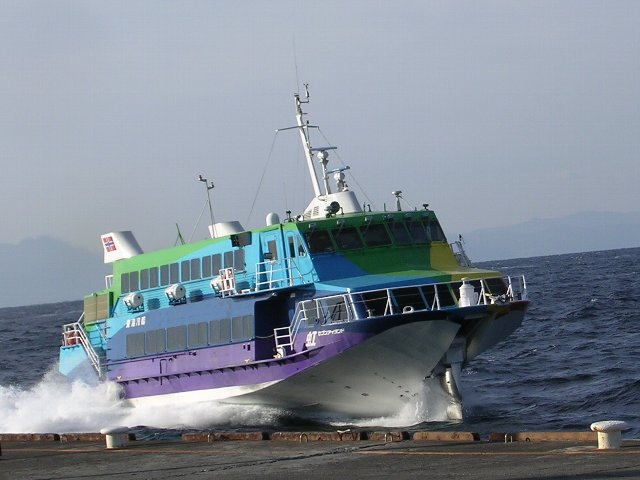
Jetfoil 929-115-019 Niji of Tōkai Kisen

== History ==
Boeing launched three Jetfoil 929-100 hydrofoils that were acquired in 1975 for service in the Hawaiian Islands, which were operated by Honolulu-based operator Seaflite. Seaflite operated three Boeing 929-100 Jetfoils between 1975 and the company's demise in 1979. When the service ended, the three hydrofoils were acquired by Shun Tak Holdings' Far East Hydrofoil (now TurboJET) for service between Hong Kong and Macau. About two dozen Boeing Jetfoils saw service in Hong Kong–Macau, Japan, South Korea, the English Channel, the Canary Islands, the Korea Strait, Saudi Arabia, and Indonesia.

In 1979, the Royal Navy purchased a Boeing Jetfoil, HMS Speedy, to provide the Royal Navy with an opportunity to gain practical experience in the operation and support of a modern hydrofoil, to establish technical and performance characteristics, and to assess the capability of a hydrofoil in the Fishery Protection Squadron.

In 1980, B&I Line introduced a Jetfoil service from Dublin to Liverpool with the Jetfoil Cú Na Mara (English: Hound of the Sea). The service was not a success and was discontinued at the end of the 1981 season.

The Belgian Regie voor Maritiem Transport (RMT) operated the Jetfoils Princesse Clementine and Prinses Stephanie on the Ostend to Dover route from 1981 until 1997.

In North America, the Boeing Jetfoil saw regularly scheduled service between Seattle, Washington and Victoria, British Columbia during the summer tourist season of 1980. Leased from Boeing, a single Jetfoil, the Flying Princess, was operated by the non-profit Flying Princess Transportation Corp., with the close co-operation and assistance of the B.C. Steamship Company. Regularly scheduled service ran from Seattle to Victoria to Vancouver from April to September 1985 by Island Jetfoil. Boeing reclaimed the Island Jetfoil boat and sold it for service in Japan.

In June 2029, after a break of eight years, one is scheduled be delivered to Kyushu Corporation for use on the Hakata to Iki Island and Tsushima Island service.

== Vessels ==
=== Boeing Marine Systems ===
Hull	Type	Original name	Original operator	Delivery	2nd name	2nd operator	3rd name	3rd operator	4th name	4th operator	5th name	5th operator	Disposition
No. 1	929-100	Jetfoil One	Boeing Marine Systems	Jul 1974	Kalakaua1975	Seaflite Pacific Sea Trsp.	1978 Flores	Far East Hydrofoil / TurboJET Hong Kong					Scrapped in 2026 (Retired in 2008)
No. 2	929-100	Madeira	Far East Hydrofoil / TurboJET Hong Kong	Feb 1975									Retired after accident in 2013, and scrapped in 2026
No. 3	929-100	Kamehameha	Seaflite Pacific Sea Trsp.	Mar 1975	1978 Corvo	Far East Hydrofoil / TurboJET Hong Kong	Hijet	Hijet Ferry / Miraejet Co. Ltd.					Inactive
No. 4	929-100	Kuhio	Seaflite Pacific Sea Trsp.	Sep 1975	1978 Pico	Far East Hydrofoil / TurboJET Hong Kong							Retired in 2018 and scrapped in 2021
No. 5	929-100	Santa Maria	Far East Hydrofoil / TurboJET Hong Kong	Jun 1975									Scrapped in 2021 (Retired in 2019)
No. 6	929-100	Anita Dan	J.Lauritzen Seaflight	Oct 1976	1977 Jet Caribe	Turismo Margarita	1979 Sao Jorge	Far East Hydrofoil / TurboJET Hong Kong					Scrapped in 2025
No. 7	929-100	Flying Princess	P&O Jet Ferries	Sep 1976	Princesa Voladora1980	Trasmediterranea	1981 Urzela	Far East Hydrofoil / TurboJET Hong Kong					Scrapped in 2021
No. 8	929-100	Jet Oriente	Turismo Margarita	Feb 1977	Jet Caribe II1978	-	1979 Acores	Far East Hydrofoil / TurboJET Hong Kong	Kobee II	Miraejet Co. Ltd.	Kobee III	-	Inactive
No. 9	929-100	Okesa	Sado Steam Ship	Feb 1977	Guia	Far East Hydrofoil / TurboJET Hong Kong							Scrapped in 2021 (Retired in 2018)
No. 10	929-100	Flying Princess II	P&O Jet Ferries	Jul 1978	Ponta Delgada	Far East Hydrofoil / TurboJET Hong Kong	Kobee V	Miraejet Co. Ltd.					Inactive
No. 11	929-115	Mikado	Sado Steam Ship	1979	2003 Toppy 4	Tane Yaku Jetfoils	Toppy 7	-					Active
No. 12	929-115	Normandy Princess	Jetlink Ferries Ltd.	Feb 1979	1980 Terceira	Far East Hydrofoil / TurboJET Hong Kong							Active
No. 13	929-115	Jet Ferry One	P&O Jet Ferries	Sep 1979	1982 Funchal	Far East Hydrofoil / TurboJET Hong Kong							Scrapped in 2025
No. 14	929-115	HMS Speedy (P296)	Royal Navy	Jan 1979	1982 Speedy Princess	-	Lilau	Far East Hydrofoil / TurboJET Hong Kong					Scrapped in 2021 (Retired in 2019)
No. 15	929-115	Cú Na Mara	B&I Line	1980	1982 Ginga	Sado Steam Ship							Active
No. 16	929-115	Jet Ferry Two	P&O Jet Ferries	Apr 1980	1982 Horta	Far East Hydrofoil / TurboJET Hong Kong							Scrapped in 2025
No. 17	929-115	Montevideo Jet	Alimar S.A. Argentina	Oct 1980	1981 Aries	Boeing Marine Systems	1985 Spirit Of Friendship	Island Jetfoil Co. Canada	1987 Jet 7	Jet Line Kansai Kisen	2000 Seven Island Ai	Tōkai Kisen Co.	Active
No. 18	929-115	Princesa Guayarmina	Trasmediterranea	Feb 1981	1991 Cacilhas	Far East Hydrofoil / TurboJET Hong Kong							Inactive
No. 19	929-115	Princesse Clementine	RMT Belgium	Apr 1981	1998 Adler Blizzard	Adler Schiffe GmbH & Co	2001 Seajet Kara	Seajets.com	2002 Seven Island Niji	Tōkai Kisen Co.			Inactive
No. 20	929-115	Prinses Stephanie	RMT Belgium	Jun 1981	1998 Adler Wizzard	Adler Schiffe GmbH & Co	2001 Seajet Kristen	Seajets.com	2002 Seven Island Yume	Tōkai Kisen Co.			Inactive as of Dec. 2014
No. 21	929-115	Princesa Guacimara	Trasmediterranea	Sep 1981	1990 Taipa	Far East Hydrofoil / TurboJET Hong Kong							Scrapped in 2025
No. 22	929-115	Bima Samudera I	PT Pelni Indonesia	Nov 1981									2001 Laid-up in Surabaya
No. 23	929-115	Prince Abdul Aziz II	Saudi Royal Yacht	1984	Rocket 2	Cosmo Line	-	Tane Yaku Jetfoils					Active
No. 24	929-119	Bima Samudera II	Indonesian Marine	Jul 1984									1984 Laid-up in Surabaya
No. 25	929-119	Bima Samudera III	Indonesian Marine	1985									1985 Laid-up in Surabaya
No. 26	929-117	Jet 8	Jet Line Kansai Kisen	1985	1996 Falcon	Sado Steam Ship	2000 Venus 2	Kyushu Yusen					Active
No. 27	929-120	Bima Samudera IV	Indonesian Marine	uncompleted									1985 Laid-up in Surabaya shipyard
No. 28	929-120	Bima Samudera V	Indonesian Marine	uncompleted									1985 Laid-up in Surabaya shipyard

=== Kawasaki Heavy Industries ===
Built under license by Kawasaki Heavy Industries in Kobe, Japan

Hull	Type	Original name	Original operator	Delivery	Disposition (2012)	2nd name	2nd operator	3rd Name	3rd operator
No. 1	929-117	Tsubasa	Sado Steam Ship	Mar 1998	Active				
No. 2	929-117	Pegasus	Kyusyu Shosen Co. Ltd.	Jun 1989	Active	Toppy 1	Tane Yaku Jetfoils	2013 Seven Island Tomo	Tōkai Kisen Co.
No. 3	929-117	Toppy 1	Tane Yaku Jetfoils	Sep 1989	Active	Beetle 3	JR Kyushu Jet Ferries		
No. 4	929-117	Princess Dacil	Trasmediterranea	Mar 1990	Active	Pegasus	Kyusyu Shosen Co. Ltd.		
No. 5	929-117	Nagasaki	JR Kyushu Jet Ferries	Apr 1990	Active	Beetle 1	JR Kyushu Jet Ferries	2026 Ocean Jet (Tsumugi)	Kumejima Oceanjet
No. 6	929-117	Beetle	JR Kyushu Jet Ferries	Jul 1990	Active	Rocket	Cosmo Line	Rocket 3	Tane Yaku Jetfoils
No. 7	929-117	Unicorn	Kyusyu Shosen Co. Ltd.	Oct 1990	Active	Pegasus 2	Kyusyu Shosen Co. Ltd.		
No. 8	929-117	Beetle 2	JR Kyushu Jet Ferries	Feb 1991	Active	(Transferred 2024)	Kyushu Yusen		
No. 9	929-117	Venus	Kyushu Yusen	Mar 1991	Active				
No. 10	929-117	Suisei	Sado Steam Ship	Apr 1991	Active				
No. 11	929-117	Princess Teguise	Trasmediterranea	Jun 1991	Active	2007 Toppy 5	Tane Yaku Jetfoils	2014 Rainbow Jet	Oki Kisen
No. 12	929-117	Toppy 2	Tane Yaku Jetfoils	Apr 1992	Active				
No. 13	929-117	Toppy 3	Tane Yaku Jetfoils	Mar 1995	Active				
No. 14	929-117	Crystal Wing	Kaijo Access Co.	Jun 1994	Active	2002 Beetle 5	JR Kyushu Jet Ferries	2014 Seven Island Tairyo	Tōkai Kisen Co.
No. 15	929-117	Emerald Wing	Kaijo Access Co.	Jun 1994	Active	2004 Rocket 1	Cosmo Line	-	Tane Yaku Jetfoil
No. 16	929-117	Seven Island Yui	Tōkai Kisen Co.	July 2020	Active				
No. 17		TBD	Kyushu Yusen	June 2029	Under construction				

=== Shanghai Simno Marine ===
Built under license by Shanghai Simno Marine Ltd. CSSC, China

Hull	Type	Original name	Original operator	Delivery	Disposition (2012)	2nd name	2nd operator
101	PS-30	Balsa	Far East Hydrofoil / TurboJET Hong Kong	1994	Scrapped in Sep 2020	-	-
102	PS-30	Praia	Far East Hydrofoil / TurboJET Hong Kong	1995	Active	KobeE	Miraejet Co. Ltd.

== See also ==
- Boeing hydrofoils
- Pegasus-class hydrofoil
