= HMS Speedy (P296) =

1979 Boeing jetfoil

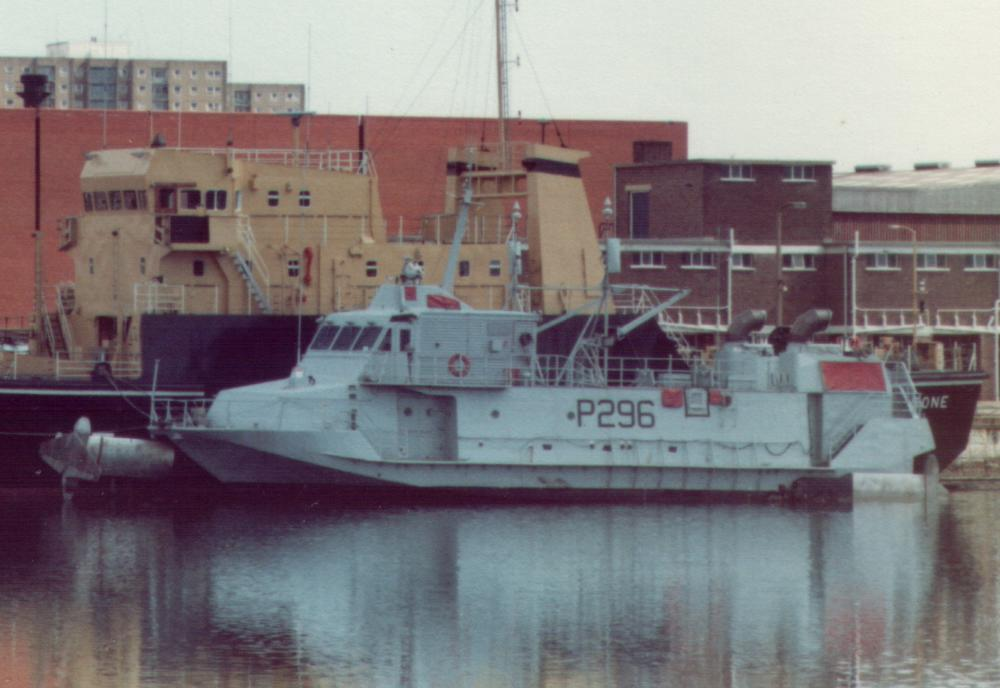
- HMS Speedy at Portsmouth, 1982

History

United Kingdom
- Name: HMS Speedy (P296)
- Operator: Royal Navy
- Ordered: 29 June 1978
- Builder: Boeing, Seattle; Shipped to the UK and fitted out by Vosper Thorneycroft.
- Laid down: 1978
- Launched: 9 July 1979
- Sponsored by: Mrs Margaret Jay, at the time wife of Peter Jay, UK Ambassador to the United States
- Completed: 1980+
- Commissioned: 1980
- Out of service: For disposal in December 1982
- Home port: HMNB Portsmouth, Hampshire
- Identification: IMO number: 8332332; MMSI number: 477039000; Callsign: VRVI5
- Fate: Sold into mercantile service in 1986, scrapped in 2021
- Notes: Pennant number: P296

General characteristics
- Displacement: 117 long tons (119 t)
- Length: Hull-borne: 90 feet (27 m); Foils retracted: 101 feet (31 m); Foil-borne: 90 feet (27 m)
- Beam: Hull-borne: 30 feet (9.1 m); Foils retracted: 30 feet (9.1 m); Foil-borne: 30 feet (9.1 m)
- Draught: Hull-borne: 17 feet (5.2 m); Foils retracted: 7 feet (2.1 m); Foil-borne: 8 feet (2.4 m)
- Propulsion: Hull-borne: 2 x Detroit GM diesel engines, producing 1,100 brake horsepower (820 kW); Foil-borne: 2 x Allison gas turbines, producing 7,560 horsepower (5,640 kW)
- Speed: Hull-borne: 5 knots (9.3 km/h; 5.8 mph)-15 knots (28 km/h; 17 mph); Foil-borne: 40 knots (74 km/h; 46 mph)
- Range: Hull-borne: 3,500 nautical miles (6,500 km; 4,000 mi); Foil-borne: 560 nautical miles (1,040 km; 640 mi)
- Endurance: 23 long tons (23 t) of fuel
- Complement: 18
- Armament: Designed for 2 × 7.62mm GPMGs on single mountings. Never fitted.

HMS Speedy (P296) was a Boeing Jetfoil, latterly a mine countermeasure vessel, of the Royal Navy, based on the civilian Boeing 929 design. She was procured in 1979, as the first of a planned class of twelve, to provide the Royal Navy with practical experience in the operation of a hydrofoil, to ascertain technical and performance characteristics, and to oversee the capability of such a craft in the Fishery Protection Squadron and North Sea Squadron. She was assigned to these squadrons in September 1981. In 1982, she was used in minesweeping and minelaying trials at Portsmouth, but these were unsuccessful and she was sold into mercantile service in 1986. The ship served as a high speed ferry between Hong Kong and Macau, under the name Lilau and operated by Far East Hydrofoil (now TurboJET) since then. The ship was idle since 2019 and scrapped in 2021 due to old age and loss of passenger demand, caused by the opening of Hong Kong-Zhuhai-Macau Bridge.

== See also ==
- Pegasus-class hydrofoil, a United States Navy class of hydrofoil fast attack patrol boats.
