= Kobee =

South Korean jet hydrofoil ferry line

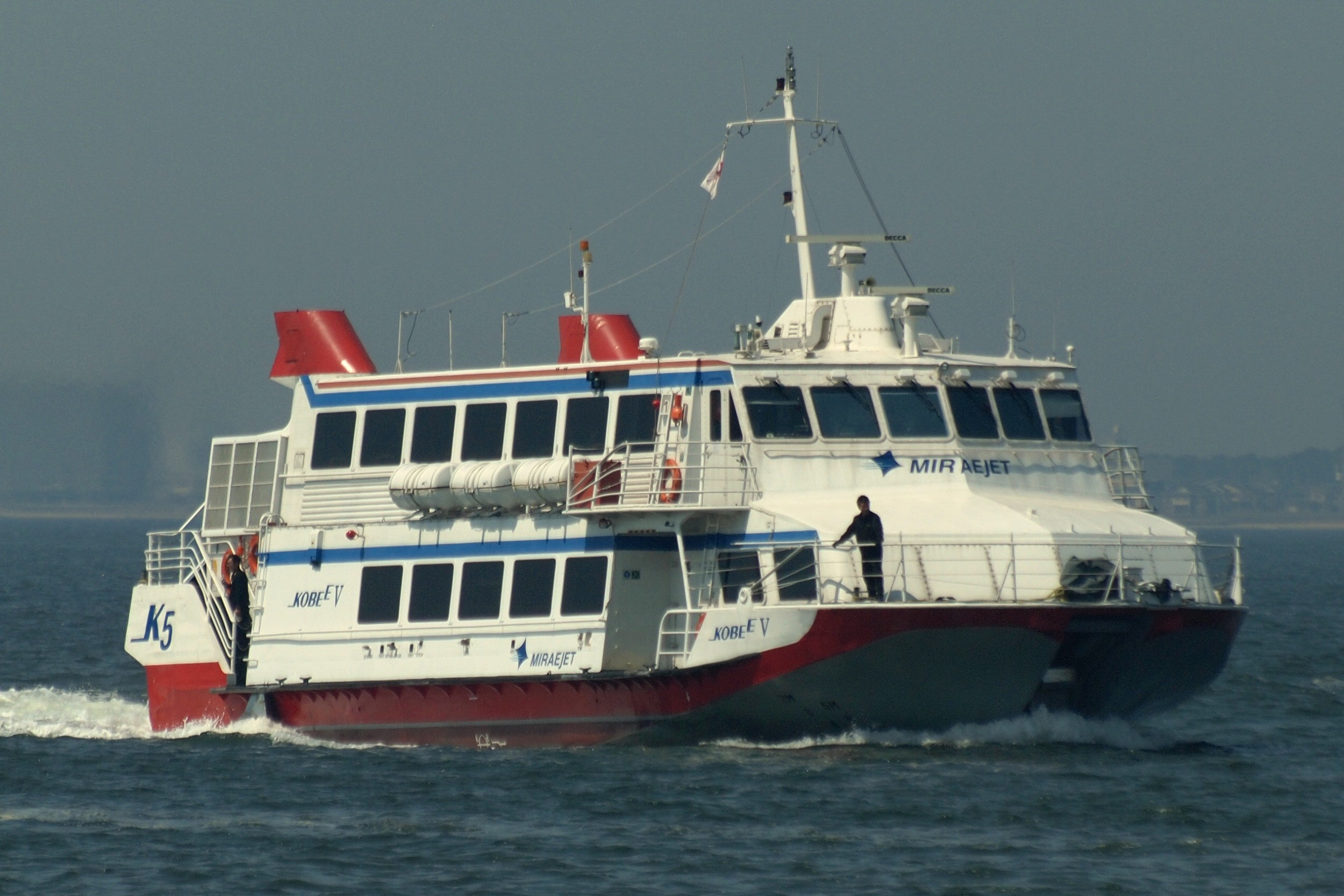
Kobee ferry

Kobee (Korean: 코비, Japanese: コビー) is a South Korean jet hydrofoil ferry line that operates services between Busan, South Korea and Fukuoka, Japan. Miraejet operates the ferry line.

In 2017, the remaining Kobee vessels between Busan and Fukuoka were suspended and extended in an on-and-off manner, until the suspension naturally continued due to COVID-19. As of 2023, the Busan - Fukuoka route was still not resumed.

== See also ==
- Beetle - A ferry line between Fukuoka and Busan operated by a division of JR Kyushu
- New Camellia - A Japanese ferry line operating between Fukuoka and Busan, offering both day and overnight services (6 - 12 hours)
