= Oshima High School =

Coordinates: 34.7655°N 139.3599°E

Oshima High School Japanese: 東京都立大島高等学校

Information
- Website: www.metro.ed.jp/oshima-h/our_school/

Tokyo Metropolitan Oshima High School (東京都立大島高等学校, Tōkyō Toritsu Ōshima Kōtōgakkō) is a high school in Izu Ōshima, Izu Islands, Tokyo.
