= Port of Motomachi =

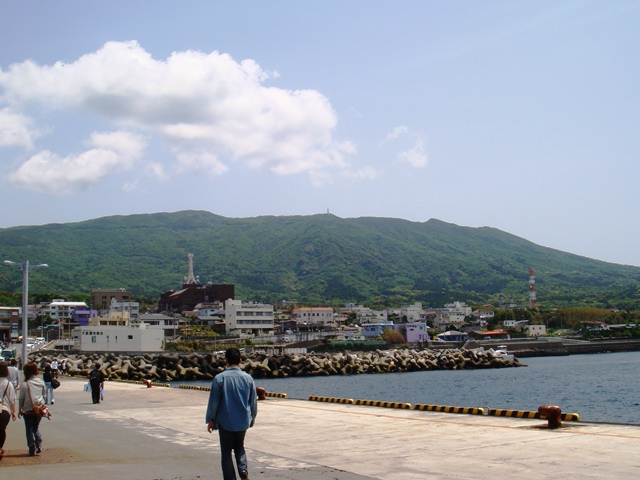
- Motomachi Port
- Interactive map of Port of Motomachi
- Location in Japan

Location
- Country: Japan
- Location: Oshima, Tokyo, Tokyo
- Coordinates: 34.751997°N 139.352485°E

Details
- Opened: 31 March 1953
- Owned by: Tokyo
- Type of harbour: Seaport

Statistics
- Vessel arrivals: 1,314
- Passenger traffic: 107,820
- Website; Port of Motomachi

The Port of Motomachi (元町港) is located in Motomachi, Oshima, Tokyo, Tokyo.

== Outline ==
The port of Motomachi has facilities including a waiting room and pier for mooring small boats. The waiting room also plays an important role in seeking refuge from volcanic bombs when Mt. Mihara erupts. When it is not possible for ferries to moor on Motomachi Port due to bad weather, ferries go to Okata Port, which is an adjunct port of Motomachi in Oshima.

=== Facilities ===
There are a ticket counter on the ground floor, a store named minato にぎわいマーケット on the second floor, a restaurant named minato にぎわいテーブル on the third floor, and a place of refuge on the fourth floor.

== Lanes ==
The lanes are departure routes from this ferry terminal. When it is not possible for ferries to moor on Motomachi Port due to bad weather, ferries go to Okata Port in Oshima, so when passengers confirm the timetable and port, they should access a website of Tokai Kisen.

Large ferry
Lane name	Via	Destination	Company
Salvia	Yokohama	Tokyo	Tōkai Kisen
Salvia	To-shima, Nii-jima, Shikine-jima	Kōzu-shima	Tōkai Kisen

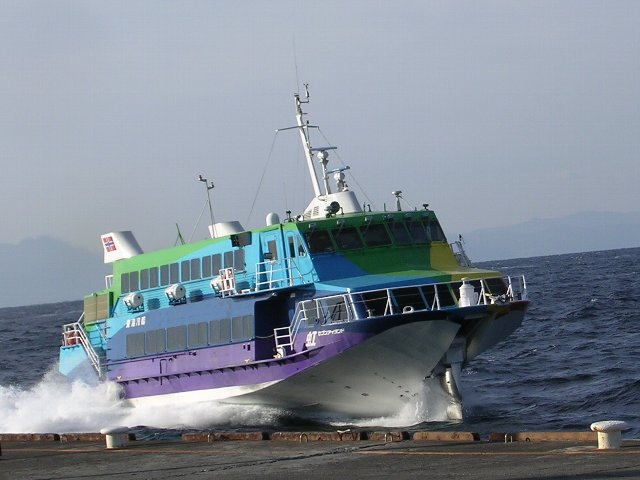
Niji, a jetfoil, belonged to Tokaikisen in 2020, moored on this port.

Jetfoil
Lane name	Via	Destination	Company	Note
Tokyo Oshima Lane	Kurihama	Tokyo	Tokai Kisen	
Tokyo Oshima Lane	To-shima, Nii-jima, Shikine-jima	Kōzu-shima	Tokai Kisen	
Tokyo Oshima Lane	Tateyama	Tokyo	Tokai Kisen	
Tokyo Oshima Lane	To-shima, Nii-jima, Shikine-jima	Kōzu-shima	Tokai Kisen	
Atami Oshima Lane	Ito	Atami	Tokai Kisen	
Atami Oshima Lane	Non stop	Kōzu-shima	Tokai Kisen	

== Ground transportation ==
There is a bus stop located in front of the Motomachi Port, connecting it to around Oshima Island.

Bus routes
Name	Via	Destination	Company	Note
Buratto・Nodahama Line	Kuko Kitaguchi, Nodahama	Okata Port	Oshima Bus	
Miharayama Line	Tsubaki・Hana Garden	Mount Mihara	Oshima Bus	
Oshima Koen Line	Oshima Airport, Okata Port	Oshima Park	Oshima Bus	
Habuminato Line	Kazan Hakubutsukan mae, Chiso Danmen mae, Kaiyo International Highschool, Habu Port	Oshimacho Rikujokyogijo	Oshima Bus	

== Surrounding area ==
- Volcano Museum

It takes about 7 minutes to travel from the port to the museum on foot.

- Kodono Shrine

It takes about 10 minutes to travel from the port to the shrine on foot. It is dedicated to Minamoto no Tametomo.

== Port of Okata ==
Port of Okata
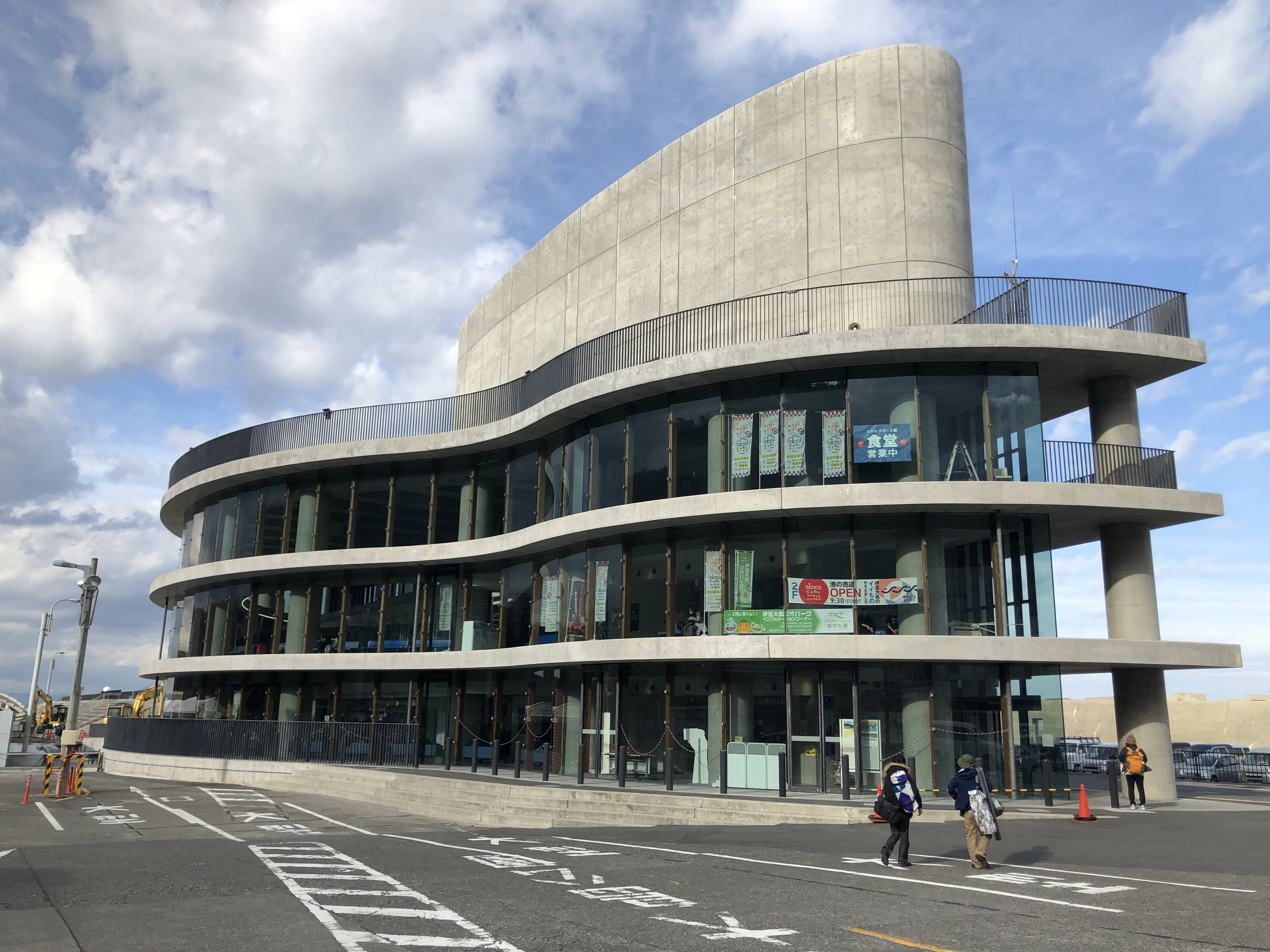
- Okata Port
- Interactive map of Port of Okata
- Location in Japan Tokyo#Japan Port of Okata (Japan)

Location
- Country: Japan
- Location: Oshima, Tokyo, Tokyo
- Coordinates: 34.789472°N 139.391700°E

Details
- Opened: 31 March 1953
- Owned by: Tokyo
- Type of harbour: Seaport

Statistics
- Website; Port of Okata

Okata Port is an adjunct port of Motomachi Port for mooring on this port instead of Motomachi when it is impossible for ferries to moor on the port of Motomachi.

=== Outline ===
The waiting room is also a facility for taking refuge from tsunamis. There are a waiting room and ticket counter on the ground floor, a store and rest space on the second floor, and a restaurant on the third floor. A rooftop that height is 12.9m evacuation center from tsunamis.

=== Ground transportation ===
There is a bus stop located in front of the Okata Port, connecting it to around Oshima Island.

Bus routes
Name	Via	Destination	Company	Note
Buratto・Nodahama Line	Nodahama, Kuko Kitaguchi	Motomachi Port	Oshima Bus	
Miharayama Line	Tsubaki・Hana Garden	Mount Mihara	Oshima Bus	
Oshima Koen Line	Tsubaki Tunnel	Oshima Park	Oshima Bus	
Oshima Koen Line	Oshima Airport	Motomachi Port	Oshima Bus	
