= Izu Ōshima =

Volcanic island of Japan located in the Philippine sea

Native name: 伊豆大島
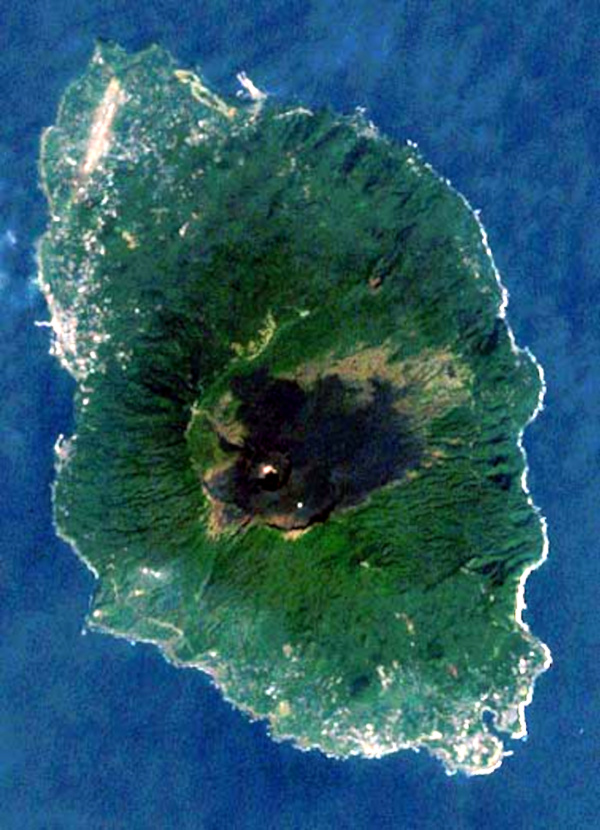

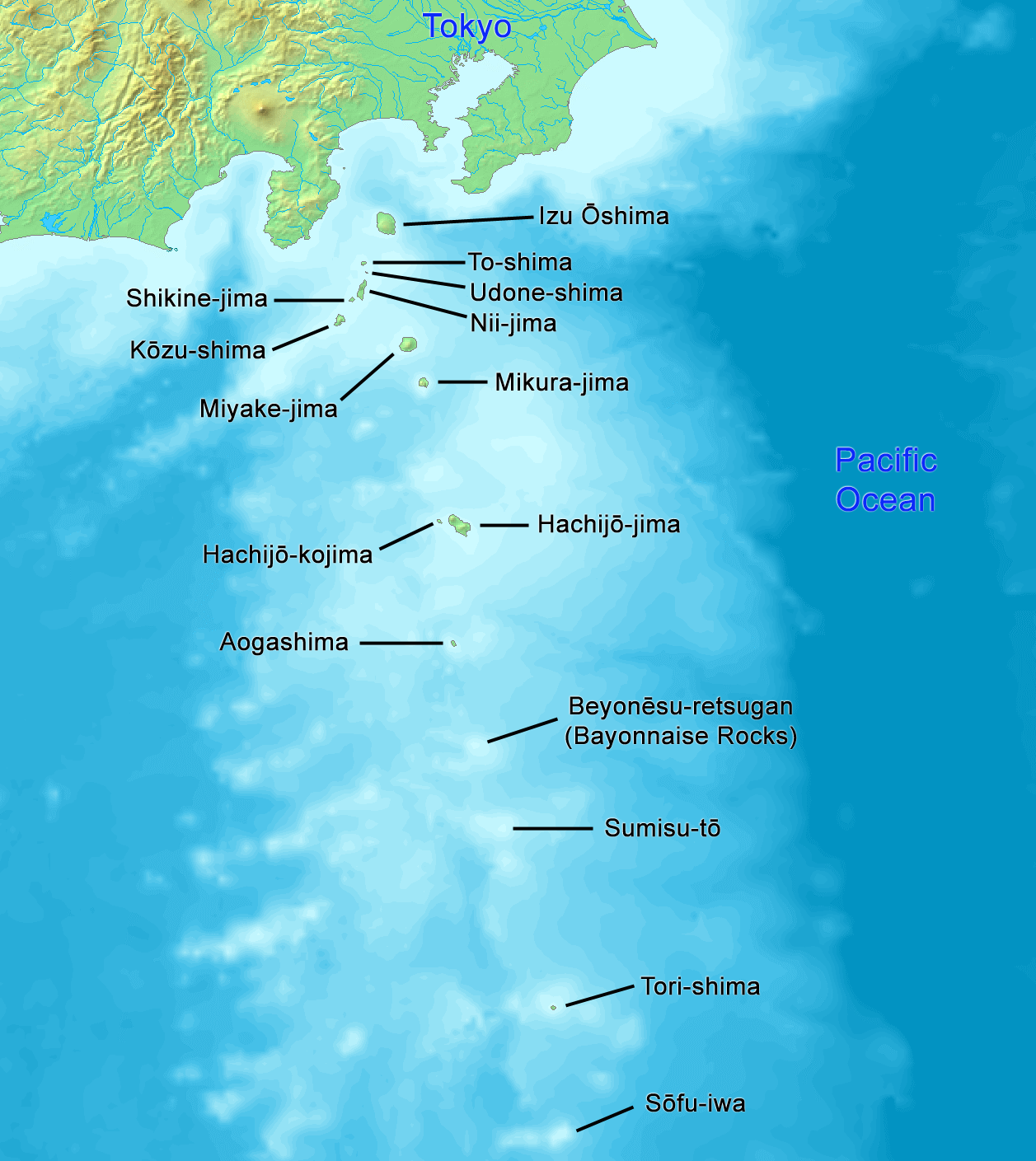

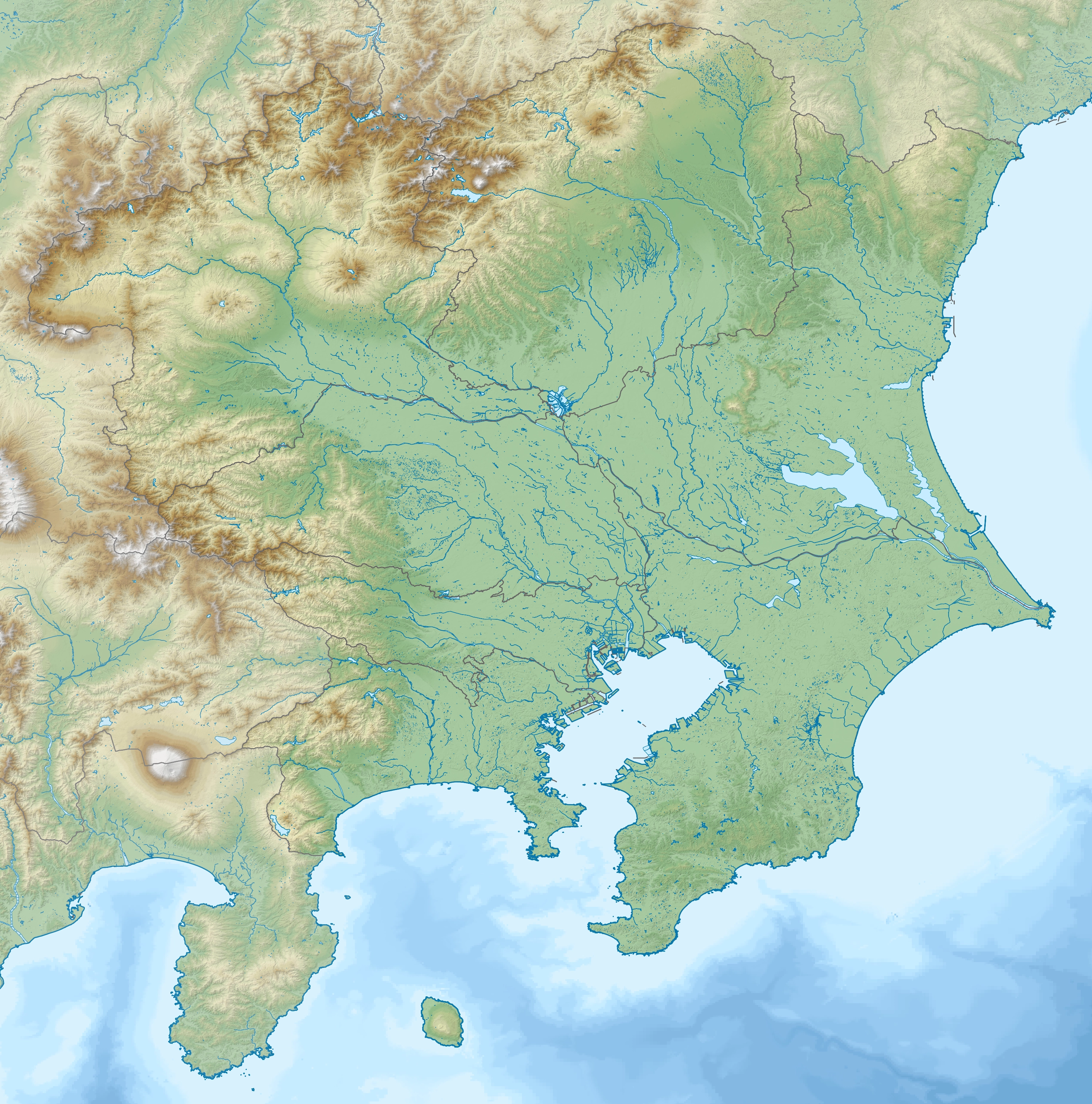
- Izu Ōshima (Kanto Area)

Geography
- Location: Izu Islands
- Coordinates: 34°44′19″N 139°23′58″E
- Area: 91.06 km^{2} (35.16 sq mi)
- Coastline: 52 km (32.3 mi)
- Highest elevation: 764 m (2507 ft)

Administration
- Japan
- Prefecture: Tokyo
- Subprefecture: Ōshima Subprefecture
- Town: Ōshima

Demographics
- Population: 8,179 (October 2015)
- Pop. density: 89.81/km^{2} (232.61/sq mi)
- Ethnic groups: Japanese

Izu Ōshima (伊豆大島, Izu-ōshima) is an inhabited volcanic island in the Izu archipelago and borders Sagami Bay and the Pacific Ocean, off the coast of Honshu, Japan, 22 km (14 mi) east of the Izu Peninsula and 36 km (22 mi) southwest of Bōsō Peninsula. As with the other islands in the Izu Island group, Izu Ōshima forms part of the Fuji-Hakone-Izu National Park. Izu Ōshima, at 91.06 km^{2} (35.16 sq mi) is the largest and closest of Tokyo's outlying islands, which also include the Ogasawara Islands.

== Geography ==
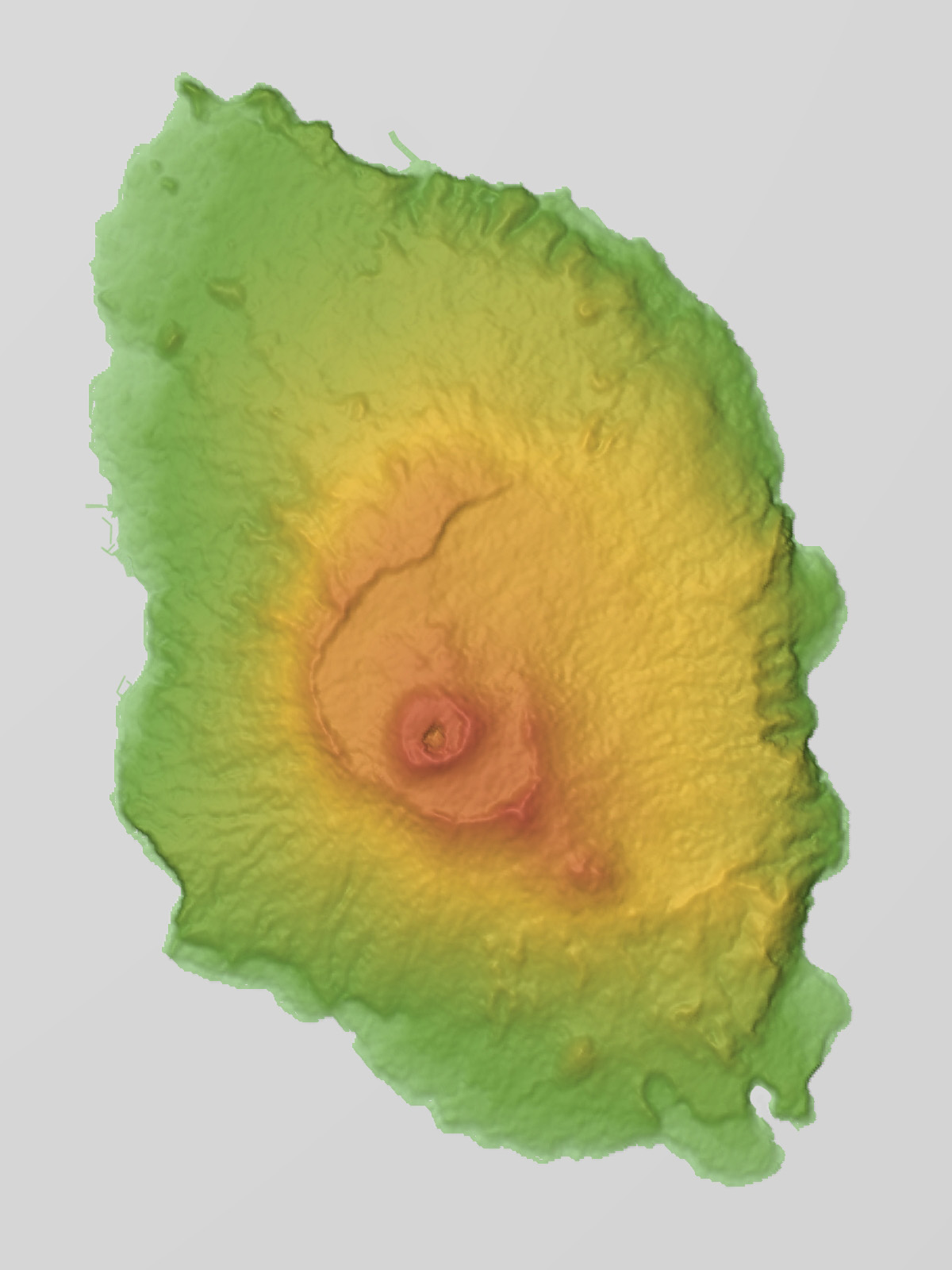
Relief map

The island is a stratovolcano with a basaltic composite cone, dating from the late Pleistocene period, between 10,000 and 15,000 years ago. It rises from an ocean floor with a depth of between 300 and 400 meters (984 and 1,312 ft). The island has a roughly circular coastline of approximately 52 kilometers (32 mi) in length. The highest elevation, Mount Mihara (三原山, Mihara-san), is an active volcano with a height of 758 meters (2,487 ft). The mountain has been recorded to have erupted numerous times through history and is mentioned as far back as Nara period written records.

Major eruptions occurred in 1965 and 1986, each forcing a temporary evacuation of the inhabitants. The last recorded eruption was in 1990.

== Important Bird Area ==
The island has been recognised as an Important Bird Area (IBA) by BirdLife International because it supports populations of Japanese wood pigeons, Ijima's leaf-warblers, Izu thrushes and Pleske's grasshopper warblers.

== Climate ==
Izu Ōshima has a humid subtropical climate (Köppen climate classification Cfa) with warm summers and cool winters. Precipitation is abundant throughout the year, but is somewhat lower in winter than the rest of the year.

Climate data for Izu Ōshima (1991−2020 normals, extremes 1938−present)
Month	Jan	Feb	Mar	Apr	May	Jun	Jul	Aug	Sep	Oct	Nov	Dec	Year
Record high °C (°F)	20.9 (69.6)	21.0 (69.8)	23.1 (73.6)	25.5 (77.9)	28.4 (83.1)	32.3 (90.1)	34.4 (93.9)	35.9 (96.6)	33.7 (92.7)	29.9 (85.8)	25.1 (77.2)	23.1 (73.6)	35.9 (96.6)
Mean maximum °C (°F)	16.4 (61.5)	17.5 (63.5)	19.7 (67.5)	22.7 (72.9)	25.8 (78.4)	28.6 (83.5)	31.7 (89.1)	32.3 (90.1)	30.9 (87.6)	27.1 (80.8)	22.7 (72.9)	19.2 (66.6)	32.7 (90.9)
Mean daily maximum °C (°F)	11.0 (51.8)	11.6 (52.9)	14.2 (57.6)	18.2 (64.8)	21.9 (71.4)	24.3 (75.7)	27.8 (82.0)	29.5 (85.1)	26.7 (80.1)	22.0 (71.6)	17.8 (64.0)	13.4 (56.1)	19.9 (67.8)
Daily mean °C (°F)	7.5 (45.5)	7.8 (46.0)	10.4 (50.7)	14.4 (57.9)	18.2 (64.8)	21.0 (69.8)	24.6 (76.3)	26.0 (78.8)	23.4 (74.1)	18.9 (66.0)	14.5 (58.1)	10.0 (50.0)	16.4 (61.5)
Mean daily minimum °C (°F)	3.9 (39.0)	4.0 (39.2)	6.6 (43.9)	10.7 (51.3)	14.8 (58.6)	18.4 (65.1)	22.2 (72.0)	23.5 (74.3)	20.8 (69.4)	16.1 (61.0)	11.3 (52.3)	6.5 (43.7)	13.2 (55.8)
Mean minimum °C (°F)	−0.7 (30.7)	−0.9 (30.4)	1.4 (34.5)	4.9 (40.8)	9.9 (49.8)	14.2 (57.6)	18.4 (65.1)	19.9 (67.8)	16.4 (61.5)	11.4 (52.5)	6.2 (43.2)	1.0 (33.8)	−1.6 (29.1)
Record low °C (°F)	−3.3 (26.1)	−4.0 (24.8)	−1.9 (28.6)	0.1 (32.2)	6.4 (43.5)	10.4 (50.7)	12.4 (54.3)	16.0 (60.8)	12.4 (54.3)	7.2 (45.0)	3.0 (37.4)	−3.0 (26.6)	−4.0 (24.8)
Average precipitation mm (inches)	137.3 (5.41)	146.0 (5.75)	238.4 (9.39)	247.4 (9.74)	256.5 (10.10)	328.8 (12.94)	255.9 (10.07)	191.7 (7.55)	341.3 (13.44)	405.2 (15.95)	192.8 (7.59)	117.6 (4.63)	2,858.9 (112.56)
Average snowfall cm (inches)	trace	1 (0.4)	0 (0)	0 (0)	0 (0)	0 (0)	0 (0)	0 (0)	0 (0)	0 (0)	0 (0)	0 (0)	2 (0.8)
Average precipitation days (≥ 1.0 mm)	7.1	7.7	11.5	10.6	10.6	12.6	10.3	8.4	12.0	12.0	9.6	7.6	120
Average snowy days	0.2	0.3	0	0	0	0	0	0	0	0	0	0	0.5
Average relative humidity (%)	64	66	70	74	79	85	87	86	83	79	74	68	76
Mean monthly sunshine hours	153.7	145.4	158.1	174.2	179.7	125.1	150.8	190.1	141.0	131.4	140.3	147.6	1,837.2
Source: JMA

== Administration ==
The island is administered by the Ōshima subprefecture of the Tokyo Metropolitan government. Ōshima Town (大島町, Ōshima-machi) serves as the local government of the island.

Ōshima Town consists of the six traditional hamlets of Okata (岡田), Motomachi (元町), Senzu (泉津), Nomashi (野増), Sashikiji (差木地) and Habuminato (波浮港), with Motomachi as the administrative center.

== Access ==
Izu Ōshima is a popular site for tourists from both Tokyo and Shizuoka due to its close proximity to the mainland. There are a number of ferries which leave from Takeshiba Pier, near Hamamatsuchō, Tokyo to Motomachi Port. Ferries also leave from Atami in Shizuoka to Motomachi. Both lanes are operated by Tōkai Kisen.

There are several flights per day from Ōshima Airport to Chōfu Airport in Chōfu.

== In popular culture ==
Mount Mihara and Izu Ōshima featured prominently in The Return of Godzilla, as the location in which the JSDF successfully trapped Godzilla after luring him to the crater, whereupon charges were detonated, sending him falling into the magma-filled volcano. Mt. Mihara appeared again in the direct sequel, Godzilla vs. Biollante, in which Godzilla was released when the volcano erupted.

Mt. Mihara and Izu Ōshima were also featured in Koji Suzuki's Ring and its film adaptation as pivotal locations for the story.

In the Pokémon franchise, Cinnabar Island is based on Izu Ōshima.

In the original anime Vividred Operation, Izu Ōshima is the home of several protagonists.

The island has a peripheral role in The Dancing Girl of Izu by Yasunari Kawabata subsequently adapted for film multiple times.

Disturbance in the Wake, a time travel novel by S.A. Ison, takes place on Ōshima Island in the 14th century.

The coming-of-age manga series Draw This, Then Die! mainly takes place on the island.

== Gallery ==
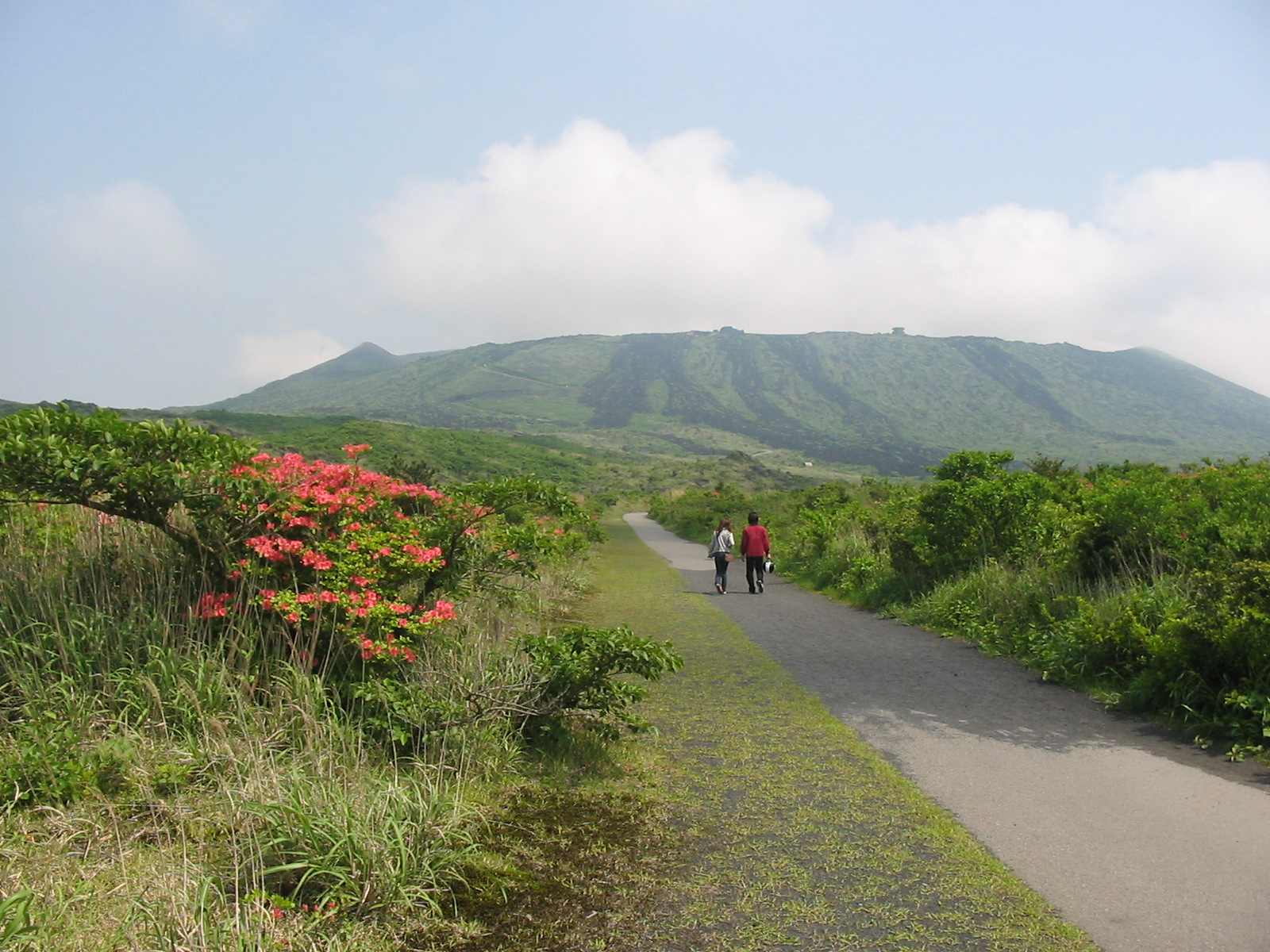
Mt. Mihara with azaleas in the foreground

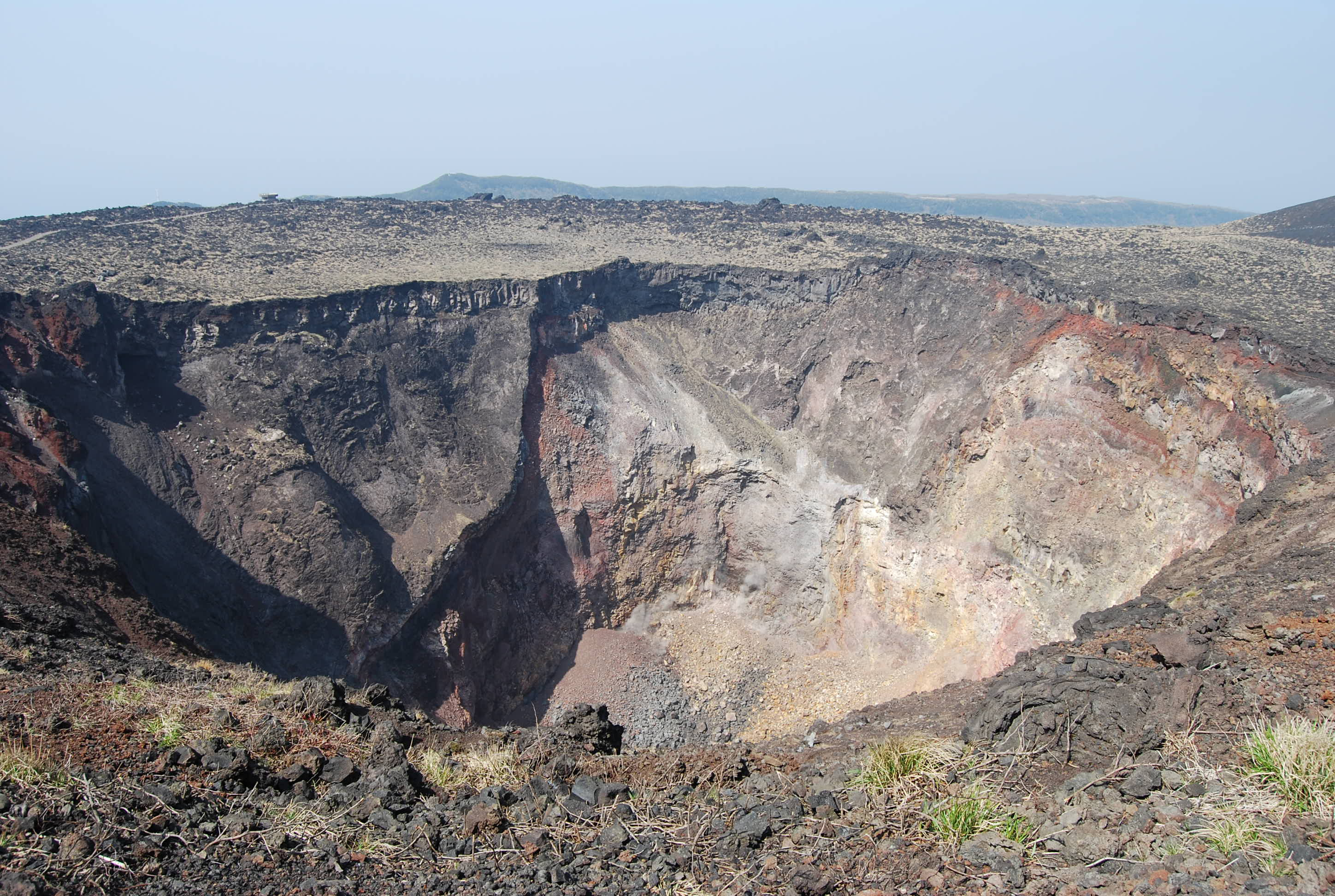
Summit crater

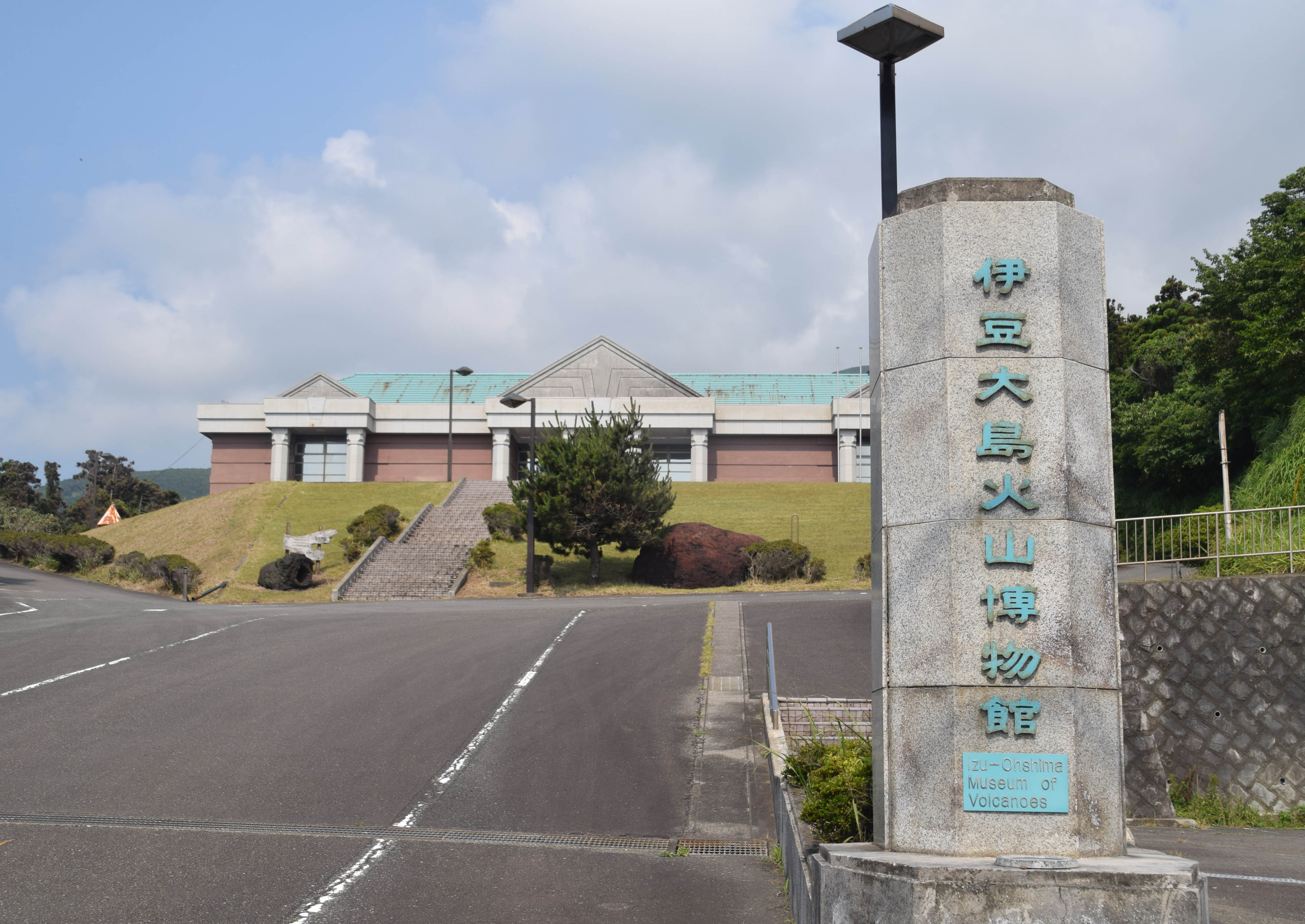
Izu Oshima Volcano Museum, Motomachi, Ōshima, Tokyo

== See also ==
- List of islands of Japan
- Izu Islands
- List of volcanoes in Japan
