= Camellia Line =

Shipping company

Camellia Line Co., Ltd.
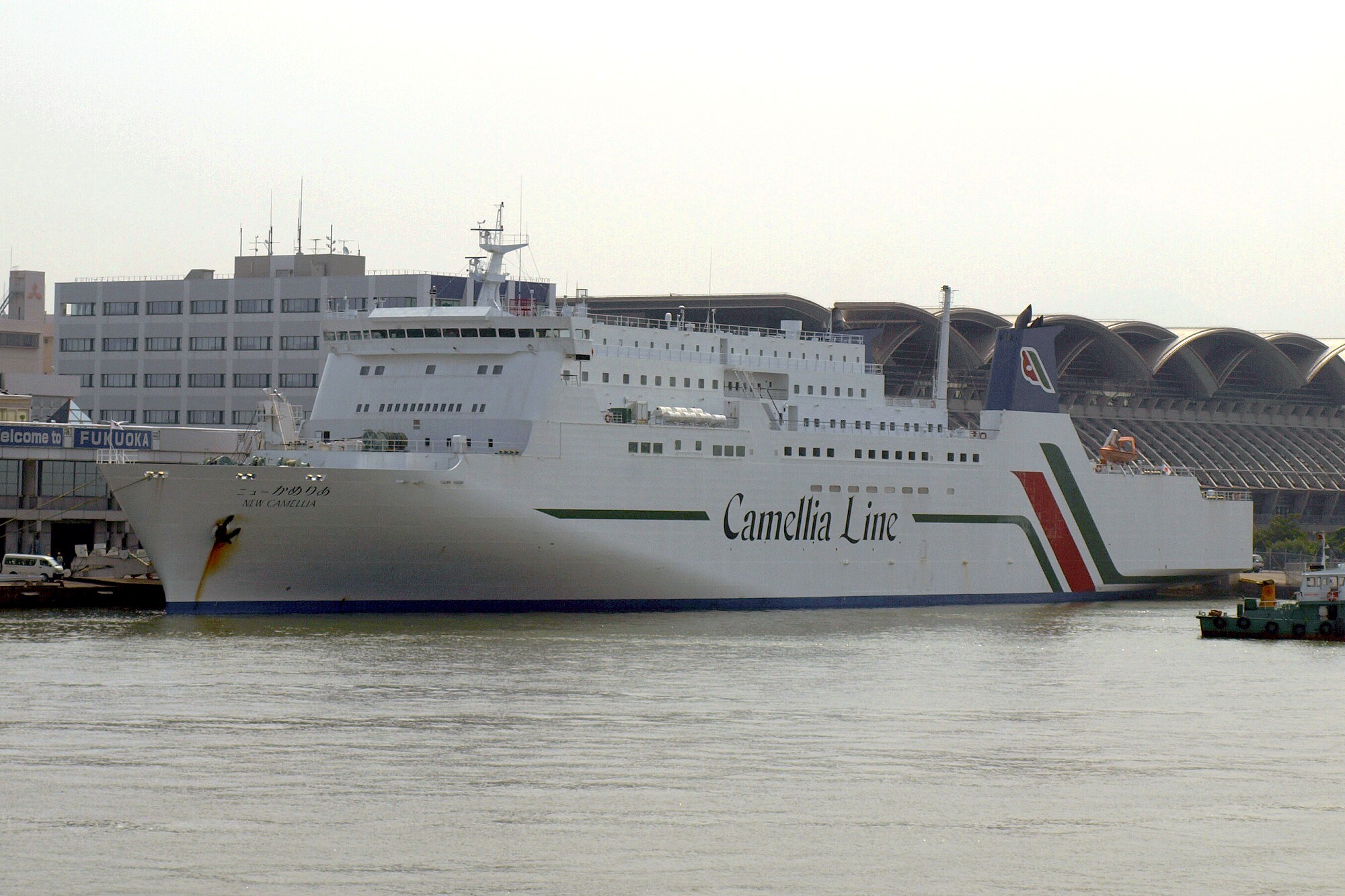
- New Camellia
- Native name: カメリアライン株式会社
- Company type: Limited Company
- Industry: Shipping
- Headquarters: 14-1 Okihama-Machi, Hakata-ku, Fukuoka, Fukuoka Prefecture, Japan
- Revenue: 400 million yen
- Number of employees: 26
- Parent: Korea Marine Transport Co. Nippon Yusen
- Website: www.camellia-line.co.jp

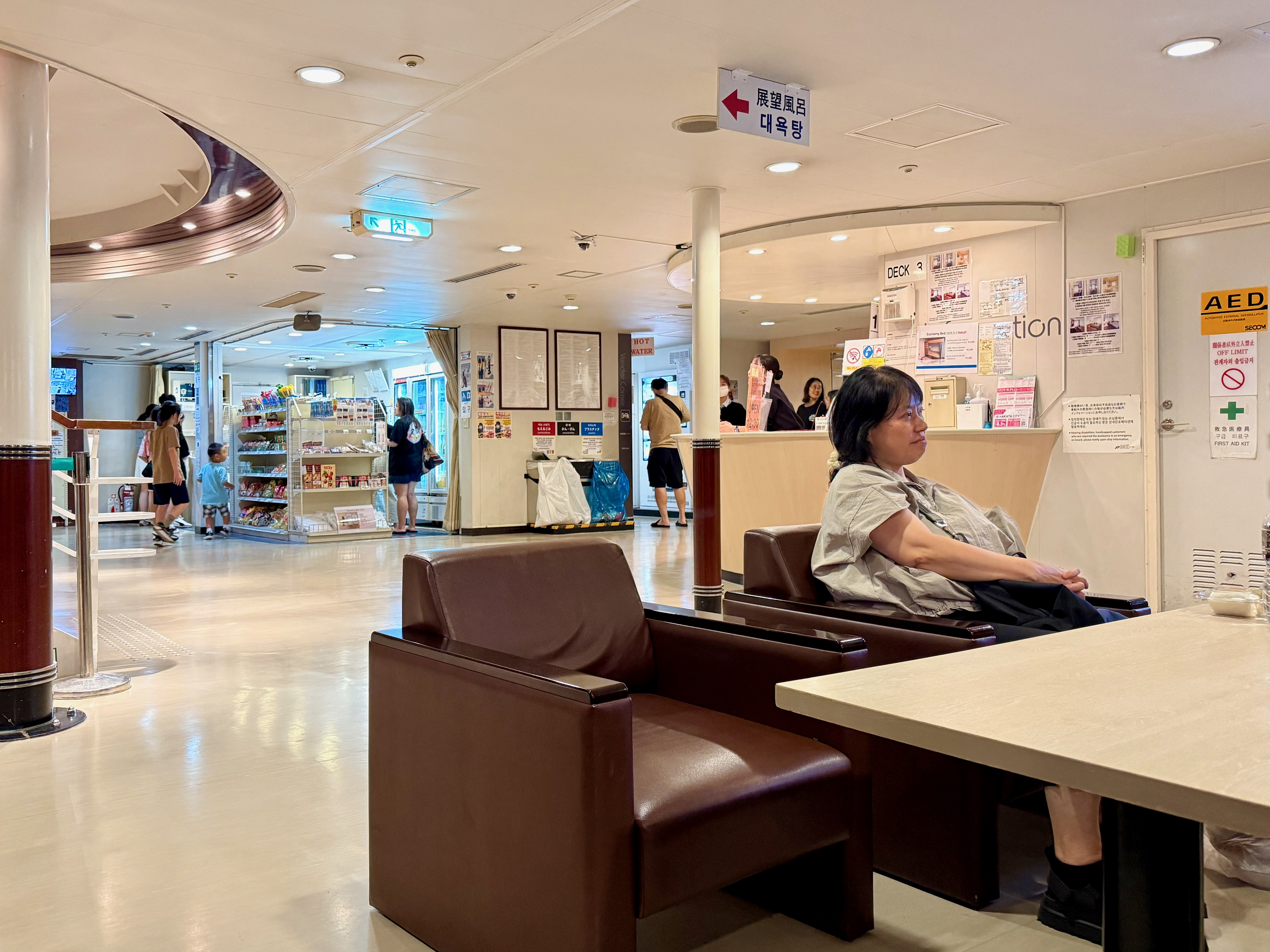
New Camellia Lobby

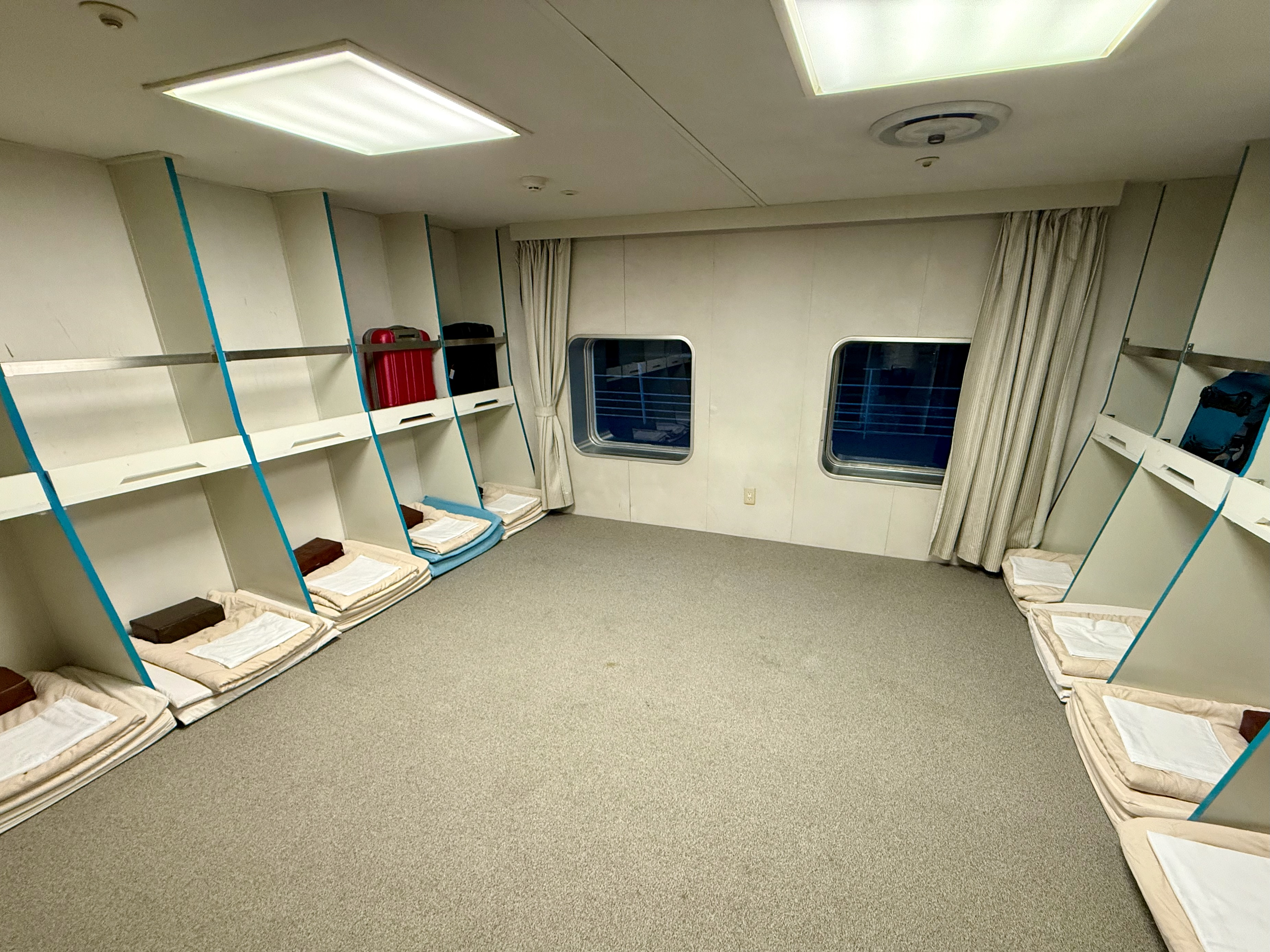
New Camellia Second-class cabin

Camellia Line Co., Ltd. is a shipping company that operates a freight passenger ship connecting Hakata Port in Japan and Busan in South Korea. It was founded in a joint venture between Japan NYK (Kinkai Yusen) in Japan and Koryo Shipping in Korea.

== Operation overview ==
One round trip ferry "New Camellia" operates between Hakata and Busan each day. It departs Hakata during day time, and then departs from Busan at night. Citizens proposed a trip for Island Hopping or a package vacation, between Busan and Hakata. It is a part of Asian Highway 1 (AH1) and the only part of the highway in the form of a ferry. From Fukuoka, AH1 takes the Camellia Line ferry to Busan, South Korea. The Japan–Korea Undersea Tunnel has been proposed to provide a fixed crossing.

=== Ships in operation ===
- 'New Camellia' (NEW CAMELLIA),

10,862 total tons (19,961 international gross tons),
Total length is 170.0 m,
Width is 24.0 m,
Voyage speed 23.5 knots,
Passenger capacity 522,
Cargo loading capacity: 41 passenger cars · 40 feet container 83 FEU · 20 feet container 54 TEU. Mitsubishi Heavy Industries
Inauguration in July 2004.

=== Past ship ===
- 'Camellia' (CAMELLIA)

8,885 total tons. Total length 166.5 m, width 24.0 m. Navigation speed 18 knots, maximum speed 21 knots.
Passenger capacity 563 people, cargo loading number 120 TEU. Construction at the Inishi Shipyard Setoda factory.
Japanese investment company · Kushiro of Kinkai Yusen -
Inaugurated the car ferry "Saroma" of Tokyo Passage in December 1990 after remodeling for international route.
Retired in June 2004, Renamed as Subic Bay 1.

== See also ==
- Asian Highway 1 (AH1)
- Pukhwan Ferry - A South Korean ferry line between Shimonoseki and Busan that offers daily overnight services (10-14 hours)
- Kampu Ferry - A Japanese ferry line between Shimonoseki and Busan that offers daily overnight services (10-14 hours)
- Hakata Port - It could be worth taking a look to see which other ferries often depart from Fukuoka
