= Mount Mihara =

Active volcano in Japan

- 三原山
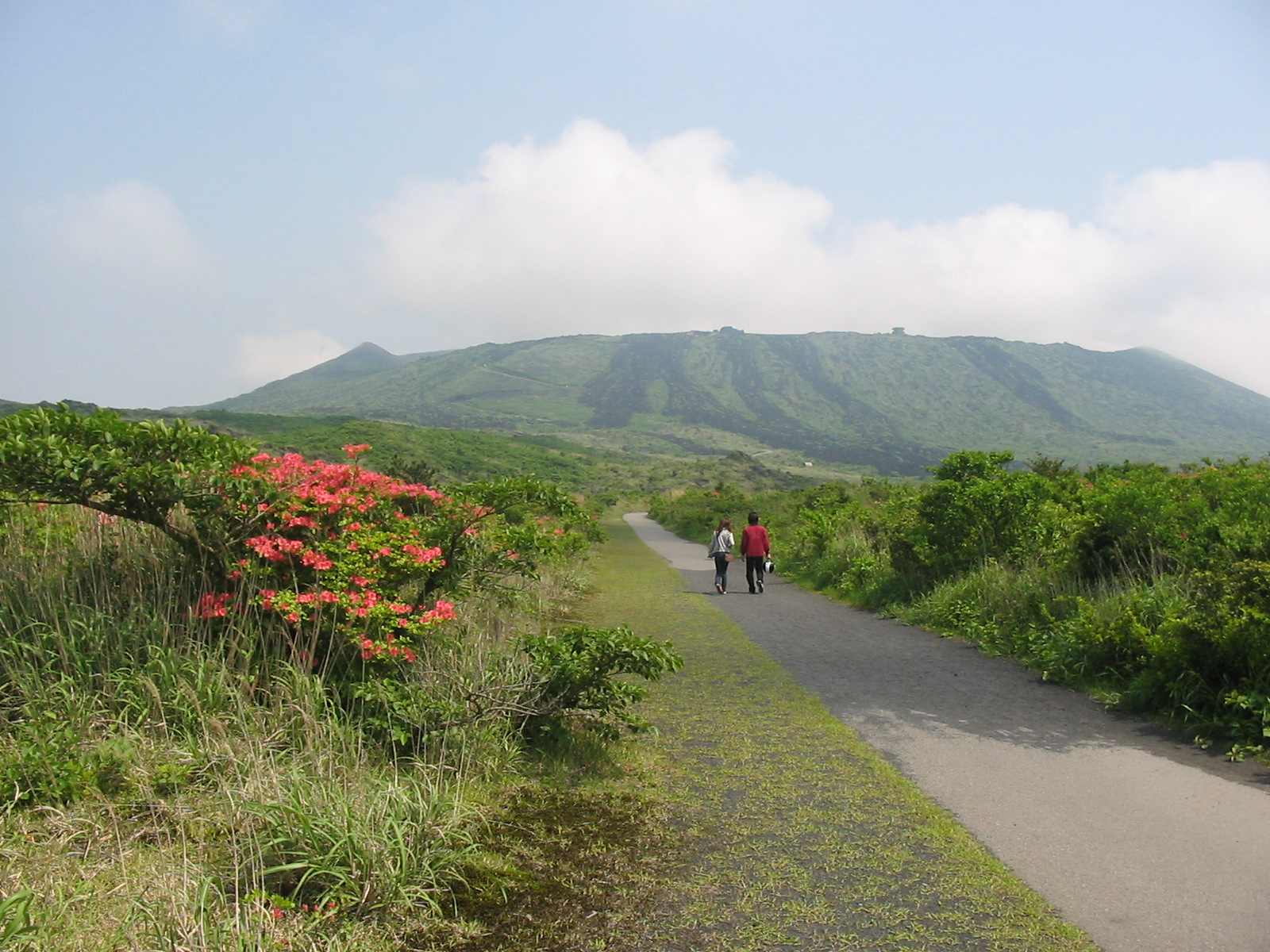
- Volcanic peak of Mount Mihara

Highest point
- Elevation: 764 m (2,507 ft)
- Coordinates: 34°43′28″N 139°23′41″E

Geography
- Location within Japan
- Location: Izu Ōshima, Japan

Geology
- Mountain type: Stratovolcano with summit caldera
- Last eruption: October 1990

Mount Mihara (三原山, Mihara-yama) is an active volcano on the Japanese isle of Izu Ōshima. Although the volcano is predominantly basaltic, major eruptions have occurred at intervals of 100–150 years.

== History ==
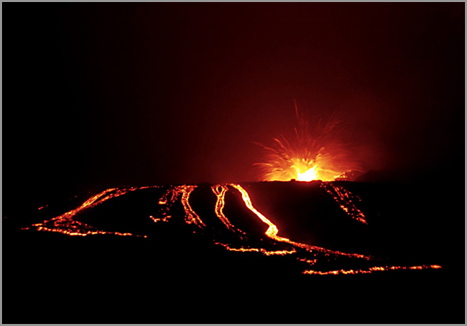
1986 Izu Ōshima eruption

Mount Mihara's major eruption in 1986 saw lava fountains up to 1.6 kilometres (1.0 mi) high. The eruption had a Volcanic Explosivity Index of 3, and involved a central vent eruption, radial fissure eruption, explosive eruption, lava flows, and a lava lake eruption. There was also a 16 km high subplinian plume. All of the island's 12,000 inhabitants were evacuated by dozens of military and civilian volunteer vessels.

The most recent eruption was in 1990.

=== Tourism ===
Mount Mihara is a popular tourist destination. The volcano's low height and gentle slopes makes it suitable for hiking; walking to the volcano's summit on foot takes around an hour, and offers views of Mount Fuji.

=== Suicide ===
From a vantage point near the top of the cone it was once possible to leap into the crater. As a result, the volcano became a popular venue for suicides. Beginning in the 1920s, several suicides occurred in the volcano every week. The most notable death by suicide was that of twenty-one year old Matsumoto Kiyoko, who jumped into the volcano on February 12, 1933. She and a classmate, Tomita Masako, had planned to go to the volcano together as part of a dōsei shinjū (a same-sex lover's suicide), but after climbing the volcano, Tomita was stopped by a guard. It was later revealed that Tomita had witnessed a suicide attempt a short while previously with another girl, and to get to the volcano, she had purchased a round-trip ferry ticket. Newspapers branded her as a suicide guide and ran dramatized stories warning of the dangers of same-sex relationships between women. After the incident, the suicide toll skyrocketed to 945 that year alone. Authorities eventually erected a fence around the base of the structure to curb the number of suicides.

== Mihara in popular culture ==
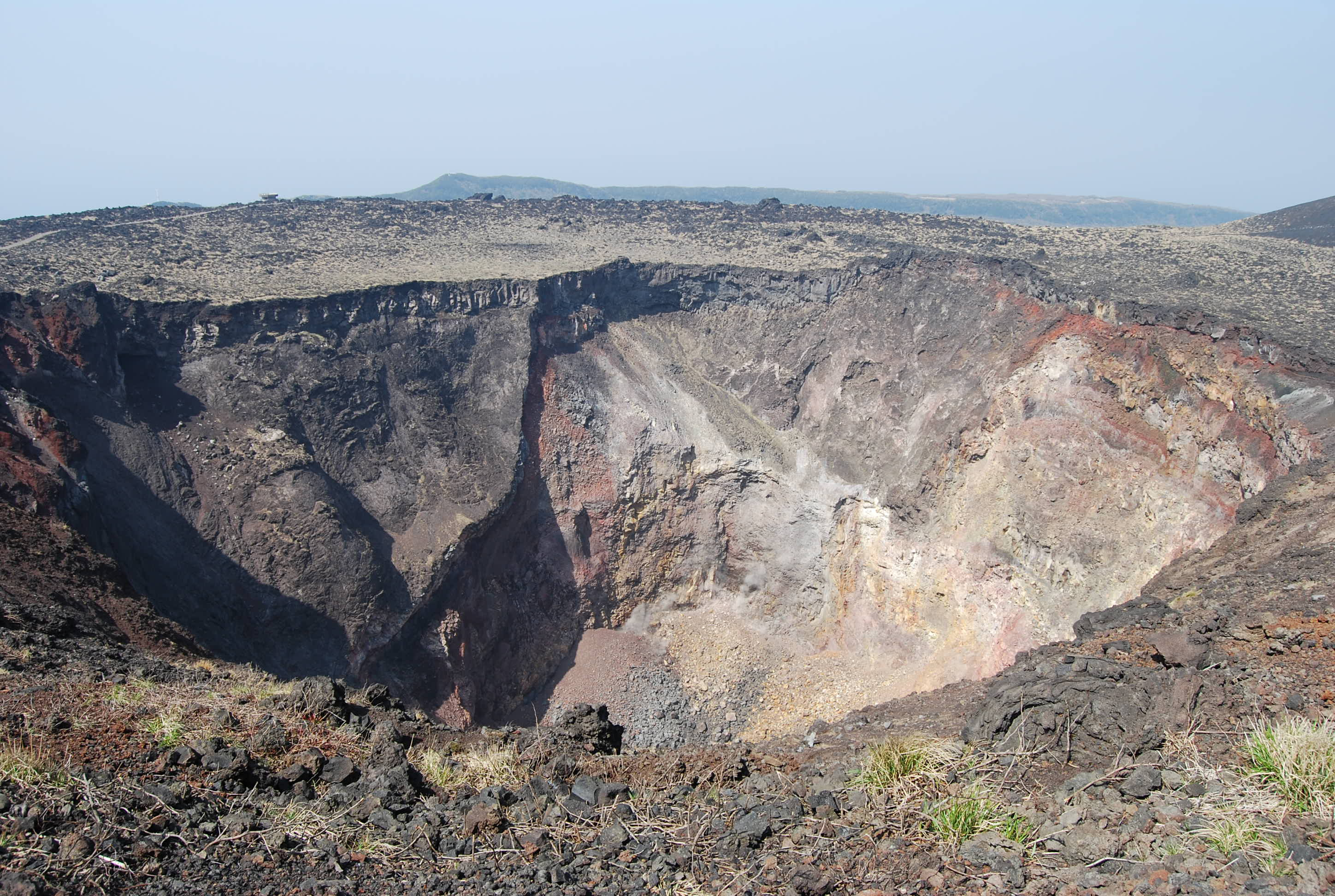
Mount Mihara summit

Mount Mihara has been featured numerous times in fiction. In 1965, Oshima Island and the volcano itself appeared in the climax of Gamera's debut film, where the military lured the giant turtle there as a means to trap it in a giant rocket ship built on the island.

Mount Mihara features prominently in the finale of the 1984 kaiju film The Return of Godzilla, where it serves as Godzilla's prison after he falls into the volcano during an eruption. Five years later, in the sequel Godzilla vs. Biollante, bombs placed on Mt. Mihara go off and release Godzilla from the volcano.

In the novel Ring by Koji Suzuki and its subsequent film adaptation, Shizuko Yamamura, the mother of Sadako, predicted that Mount Mihara would someday erupt using her psychic abilities. After a failed psychic demonstration which resulted in Sadako psychically murdering a reporter, Shizuko became depressed and ultimately insane and committed suicide by leaping into the crater of Mount Mihara.

== Bibliography ==
- Night Falls Fast: Understanding Suicide by Kay Redfield Jamison, Vintage Books 2000
