= Seven Islands of Izu =

Seven inhabited islands of the Izu islands

Coordinates: 33°49′N 139°37′E

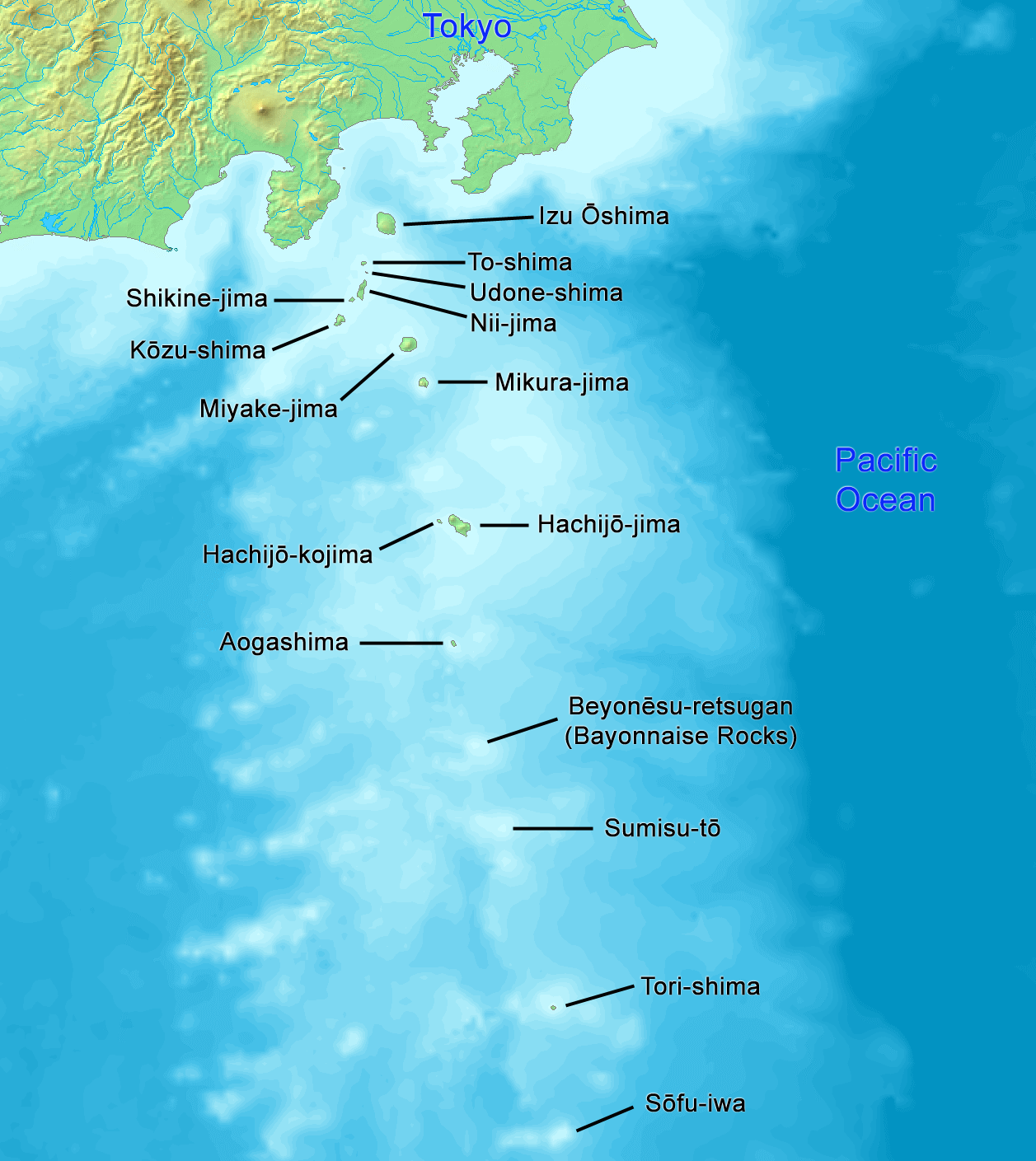
The Seven Islands of Izu are the seven larger inhabited islands of the Izu Islands that belong to Tokyo Prefecture.

The Seven Islands of Izu (伊豆七島, Izu Shichitō; Japanese pronunciation: [i.(d)zɯ, i.(d)zɯ ɕi̥.tɕiꜜ.toː]) are the seven inhabited islands of the Izu Islands that belong to the Tokyo Islands of Tokyo Prefecture, Japan.

The name comes from the fact that there were the seven main inhabited islands in the Izu Islands during the Edo period: Izu Oshima, To-shima, Niijima, Kozushima, Miyakejima, Mikurajima, and Hachijojima.

In fact, in addition to these seven islands, the Izu Islands have two other inhabited islands, Aogashima and Shikinejima, which have been inhabited since the Meiji era. In addition, Hachijokojima, which became temporarily uninhabited during the 1965s, and Udoneshima and Torishima, where there are temporary residents, were once inhabited islands. And there are also other smaller uninhabited islands.

As this name of the Seven Islands of Izu continued to be used even today, the islanders of the islands other than the Seven Islands feel discriminated., and the Aogashima villagers in particular have petitioned not to use it at every opportunity. In connection with this, the affiliated organization of Tokyo, the "Izu Seven Islands Tourism Federation," was renamed to "Tokyo Islands Tourism Federation". However, this name is still used in sightseeing pamphlets at the travel agencies, such as those of Tokai Kisen that operate ferries to the various islands.

Additionally, these Seven Islands are known for their potentially dangerous circumstances in relation to their possible volcanic activity and risks. These include the presence of volcanic gasses, ash and lapilli.

== See also ==
- Izu Islands
- Tokyo Islands
