= Tokyo Islands =

- Country: Japan
- Region: Kantō
- Prefecture: Tokyo

Population (January 1, 2008)
  - Total: 28,741

The Islands of Tokyo (東京諸島, Tokyo-shotō), also known as the Insular Area of Tokyo Metropolis (東京都島嶼部, Tōkyō-to-tōshobu) or Izu-Ogasawara islands (伊豆・小笠原諸島, Izu-Ogasawara-shotō), consist of the Izu and Ogasawara (also known as Bonin) island chains to the south of the Izu Peninsula.

== Overview ==
The islands consist of two towns and seven villages that are grouped into four subprefectures.

=== List of towns and villages ===
No.	Flag	Name	Japanese	Subprefecture
1		Ōshima	大島町	Ōshima
2		To-shima	利島村	Ōshima
3		Niijima	新島村	Ōshima
4		Kōzushima	神津島村	Ōshima
5		Miyake	三宅村	Miyake
6		Mikurajima	御蔵島村	Miyake
7		Hachijō	八丈町	Hachijō
8		Aogashima	青ヶ島村	Hachijō
9		Ogasawara	小笠原村	Ogasawara
