= Lot's Wife (crag) =

Deserted island in the Philippine Sea

Sōfu Iwa
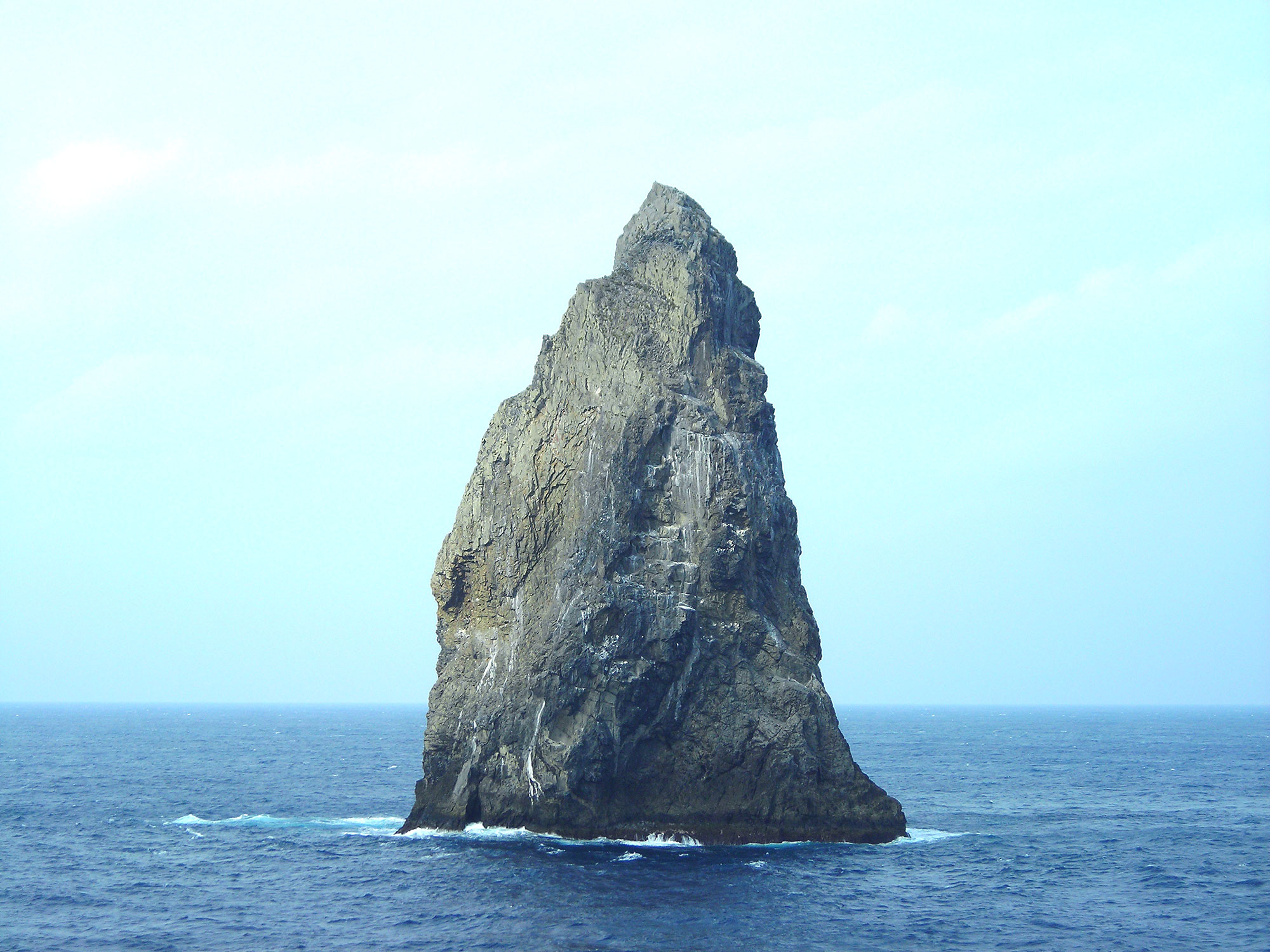

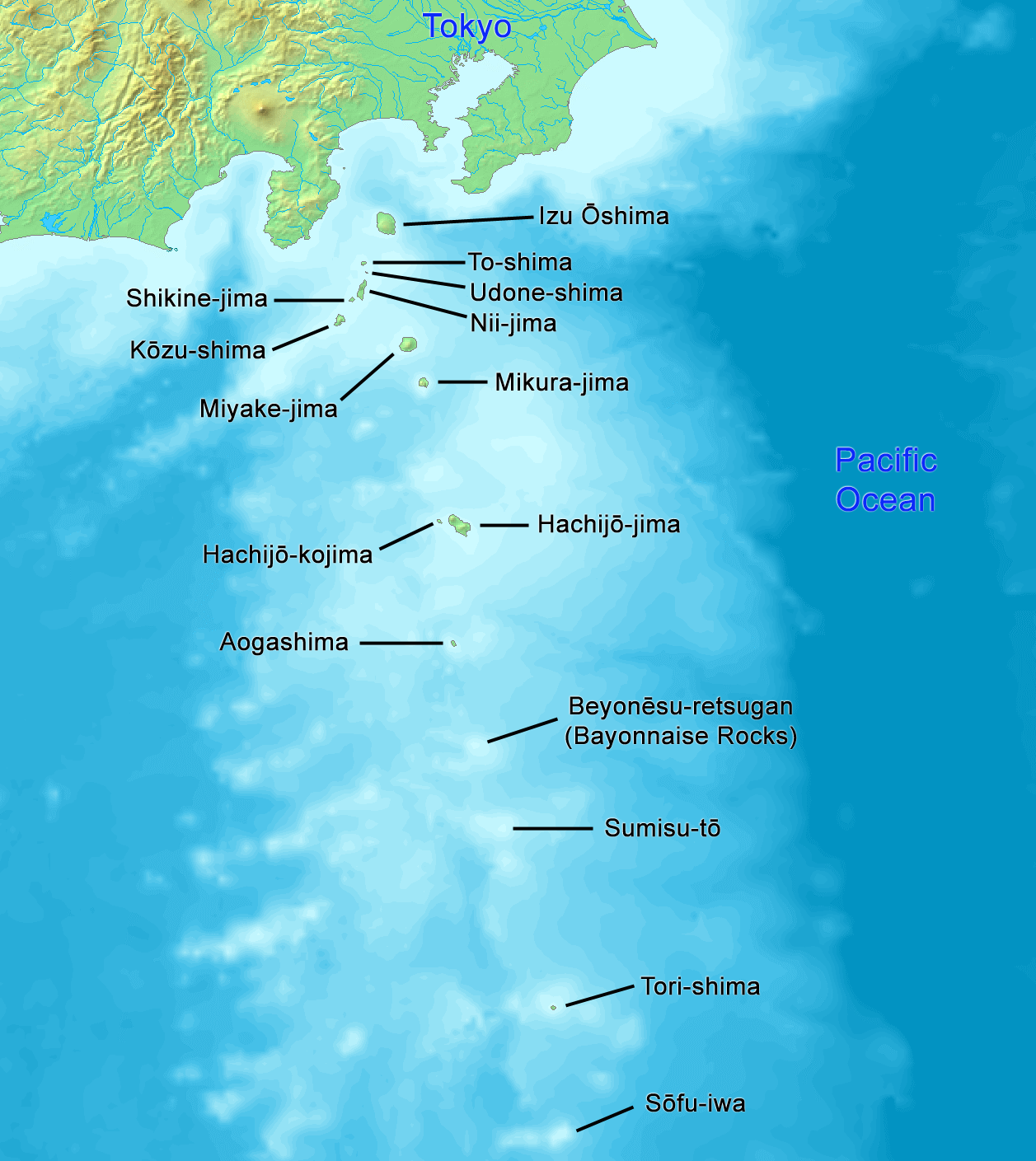

Geography
- Location: Izu Islands
- Coordinates: 29°47′39″N 140°20′31″E
- Archipelago: Izu Islands
- Area: 0.0037 km^{2} (0.0014 sq mi)
- Length: 84 m (276 ft)
- Width: 56 m (184 ft)
- Highest elevation: 99 m (325 ft)

Administration
- Japan
- Prefecture: Tokyo
- Subprefecture: Hachijō Subprefecture

Demographics
- Population: 0

Lot's Wife (孀婦岩, Sōfu-iwa or Sōfugan; "Widow Rock") is a volcanic desert island located in the Philippine Sea approximately 650 kilometres (400 mi) south off the coast of Tokyo, at the southernmost tip of the Izu archipelago, Japan. Though only 0.01 km^{2} (0.004 sq mi) in area, it reaches almost 100 metres (330 ft) in height.

== Geography ==
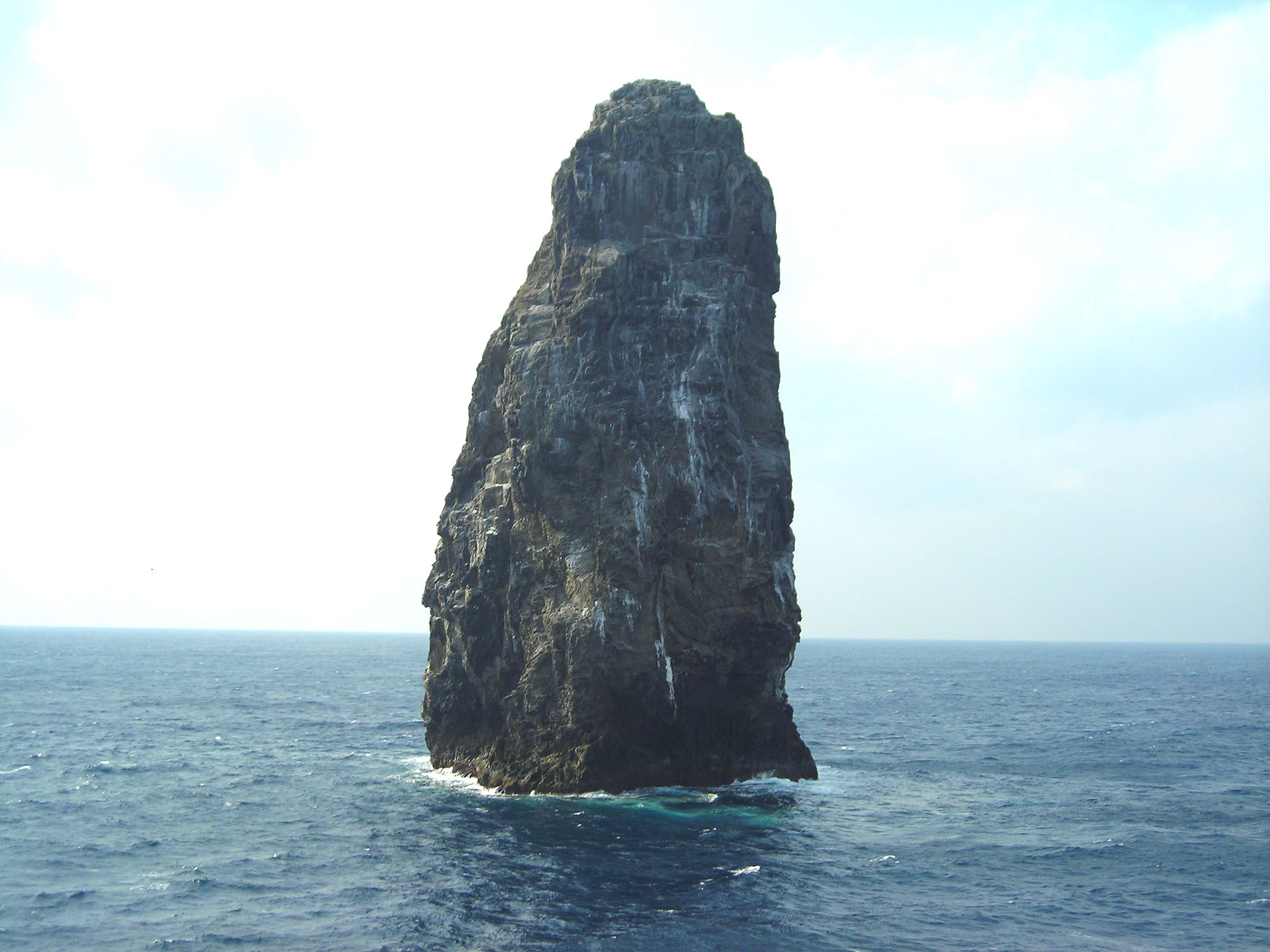
Sofugan

The island is a basalt pillar with sheer sides, the only visible portion of a submarine volcanic caldera extending 2.6 kilometres (1.6 mi) south-east at an average depth of 240 metres (790 ft). The above sea-level portion measures approximately 84 metres east-west and 56 metres north-south (276 by 184 ft), with a summit height of 99 metres (325 ft). The sides of the island features several geological joints facing the water's surface.

The island lies approximately 650 kilometres (400 mi) south off the coast of Tokyo and 76 kilometres (47 mi) from the nearby uninhabited island of Torishima. Due to its shape and heavy seas, it is almost impossible to disembark on the island, although attempts have been made by rock climbers successfully in 1972 and 2003 (though several accidents have been registered). A scientific expedition visited the island in 2017 along with an NHK film crew. The expedition was featured in an episode of the documentary series NHK Documentary, which aired in February 2019.

The site is also known for the transparency of its surrounding waters and abundance of fish, which makes it a popular scuba diving spot.

The only vegetation on the island is a few clumps of Poaceae, and the island attracts a small number of seabirds for nesting. Bird guano makes white streaks on the rock.

== History ==
On April 9, 1788, British merchant sailor John Meares sighted what he came to describe as "the most marvellous thing" he had ever set his eyes on, a small island he and the ship's crew decided to baptize as Lot's Wife, referring to the Book of Genesis 19:26. The Japanese name Sōfu Iwa ("The Widow Crag") is rather freely translated from English.

During the Pacific War, Sofu Gan was used by US Navy submariners as a reference marker for calibration of instruments as they entered Japanese waters. The uninhabited and uninhabitable island was the southernmost Japanese island not occupied by the United States after the 1952 San Francisco Treaty. It is currently administratively part of Tokyo Metropolis.

Many "peculiar" earthquakes associated with a volcanic eruption were recorded on 9 October 2023. The source was later determined to be the Sofu seamount. A pumice raft was recorded on 20 October, suggesting eruptive activity. A tsunami was associated with this event; the maximum height recorded was 60 cm (2.0 ft).

== See also ==
- Ball's Pyramid
- Rockall
- Shag Rocks (South Georgia)
- Black Rock, South Georgia
- Desert island
- List of islands
- List of islands in Japan
