= Inamba-jima =

Island in the Izu archipelago, Japan

Native name: 藺灘波島
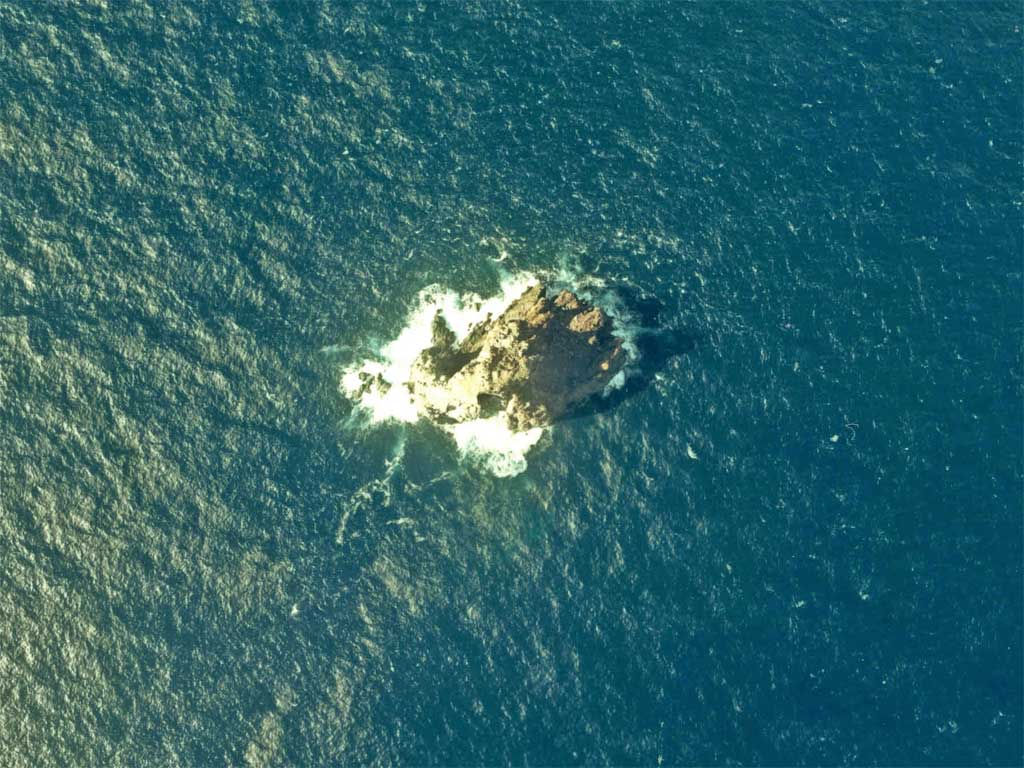

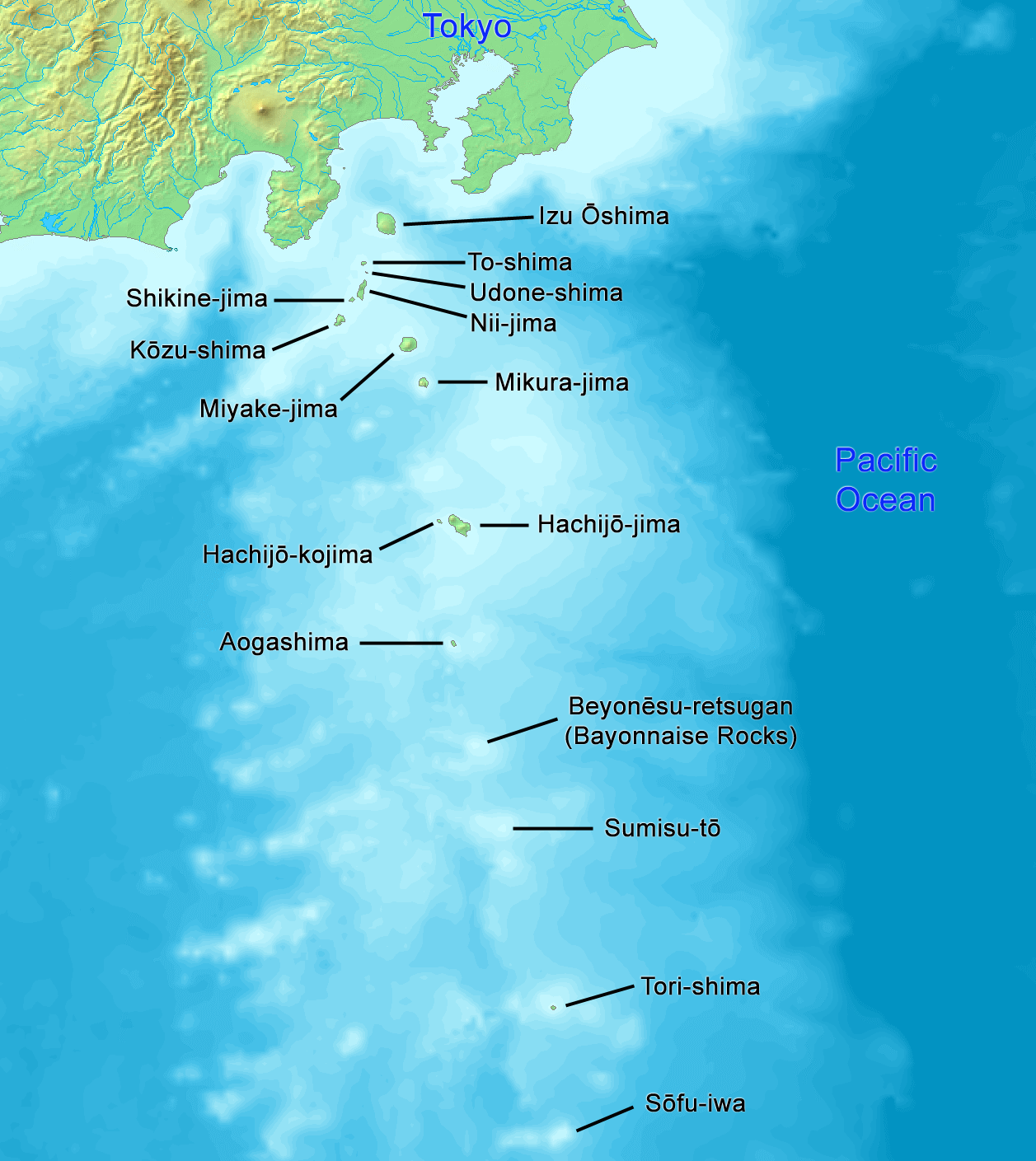

Geography
- Location: Izu Islands
- Coordinates: 33°39′03″N 139°17′56″E
- Archipelago: Izu Islands
- Area: 0.005 km^{2} (0.0019 sq mi)
- Length: 120 m (390 ft)
- Width: 70 m (230 ft)
- Highest elevation: 74 m (243 ft)

Administration
- Japan
- Prefecture: Tokyo
- Subprefecture: Miyake Subprefecture
- Village: Mikurajima

Demographics
- Population: 0

Inamba-jima (藺灘波島 or イナンバ島, Inanba-jima) is a volcanic, deserted island located in the Philippine Sea approximately 220 kilometres (140 mi) south of Tokyo and 35 kilometres (22 mi) southwest of the volcanic Mikura-jima island, in the center of the Izu archipelago, Japan.

== Geography ==
The island is an andesite pillar with sheer sides, the only visible portion of a submarine volcanic caldera. The above sea-level portion has a surface area of approximately 0.005 square kilometers, with a summit height of 74 metres (243 ft). Located in the Kuroshio Current, the area has abundant sea life, and is popular with sports fishermen and scuba divers.

== See also ==
- Izu Islands
- Desert island
- List of islands
