= Kōzu-shima =

Volcanic island in the Philippine Sea

Native name: 神津島
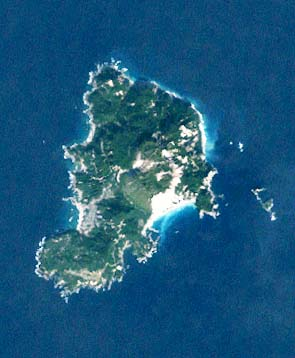
- Landsat image of Kōzu-shima

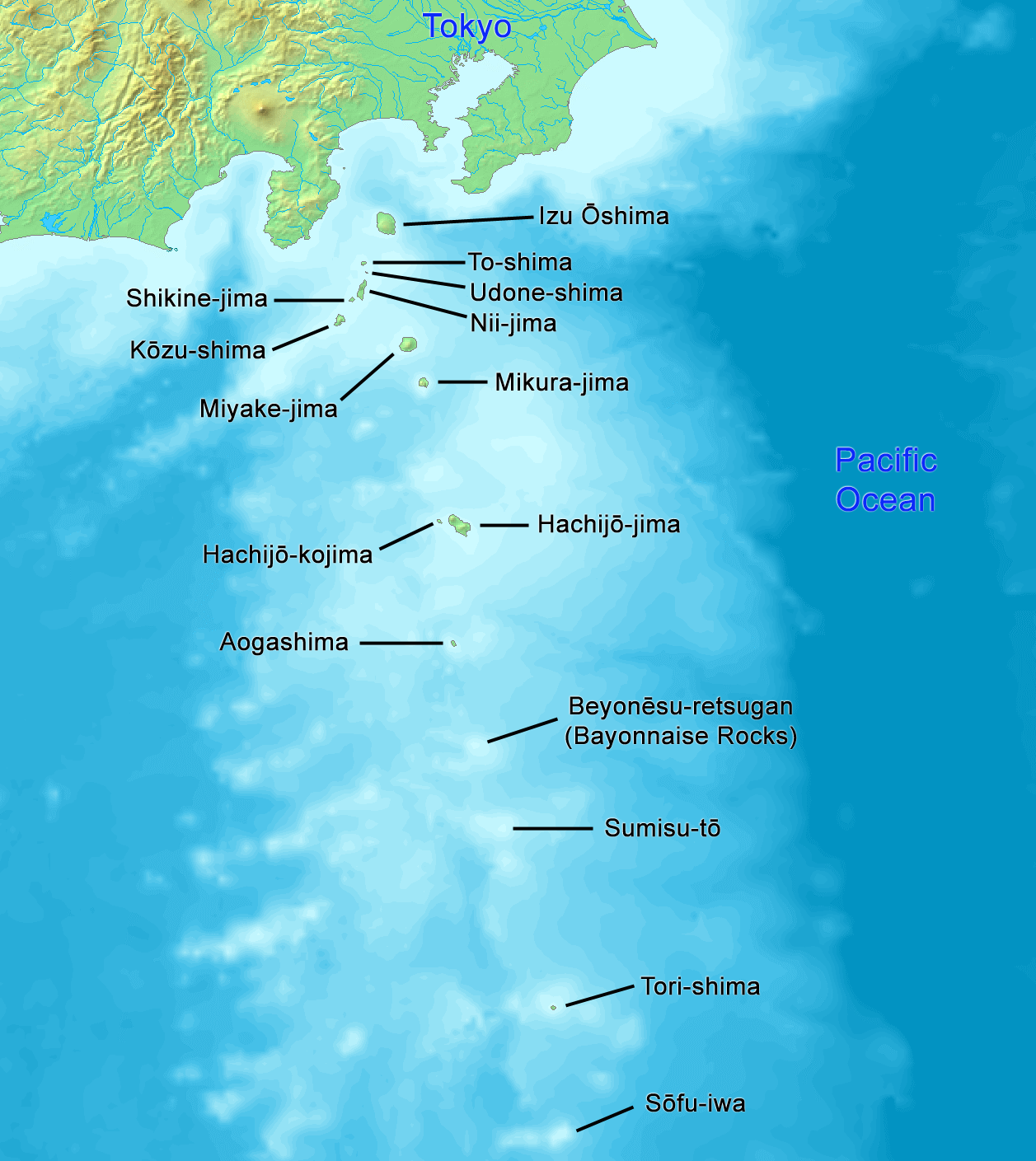

Geography
- Location: Izu Islands
- Coordinates: 34°12′58″N 139°09′23″E
- Archipelago: Izu Islands
- Area: 18.48 km^{2} (7.14 sq mi)
- Length: 6 km (3.7 mi)
- Width: 4 km (2.5 mi)
- Coastline: 22,000 m (72000 ft)
- Highest elevation: 571 m (1873 ft)

Administration
- Japan
- Prefecture: Tokyo
- Subprefecture: Ōshima Subprefecture
- Village: Kozushima

Demographics
- Population: 1952 (June 2017)

Additional information

Kōzu-shima (神津島) is a volcanic Japanese island in the Philippine Sea. The island is administered by Tōkyō and is located approximately 30 kilometres (19 mi) northwest of the Miyake-jima and 14 kilometres (8.7 mi) southwest of the Nii-jima. It is one of the Izu Seven Islands, a group of the seven northern islands of the Izu archipelago. Kōzushima is administratively part of Kōzushima Village (founded 1923), under Ōshima Subprefecture of Tokyo Metropolis. As of 2017, the island's population was 1,952. Kōzushima is within the boundaries of the Fuji-Hakone-Izu National Park.

== Geology ==
Kōzu-shima is a compound volcanic island 6 km in length with a maximum width of 4 km. The island is formed from a cluster of eighteen lava domes, with rhyolite and pyroclastic ash deposits. The highest of these lava domes, Tenjō-san (天上山), has a height of 571 metres (1,873 ft), and was last active in 838 AD per the ancient Japanese history Shoku Nihon Kōki. Compared with most of the other islands in the Izu archipelago, Kōzu-shima is relatively flat, with small eroded hills, and lacks the high coastal cliffs found on the other islands. Earthquake swarms have occurred at Kōzu-shima during the 20th century.

== Climate ==
Climate data for Kōzu-shima (2003−2020 normals, extremes 2003−present)
Month	Jan	Feb	Mar	Apr	May	Jun	Jul	Aug	Sep	Oct	Nov	Dec	Year
Record high °C (°F)	18.1 (64.6)	19.3 (66.7)	20.8 (69.4)	23.2 (73.8)	25.6 (78.1)	28.5 (83.3)	33.7 (92.7)	32.5 (90.5)	31.0 (87.8)	28.7 (83.7)	24.1 (75.4)	22.7 (72.9)	33.7 (92.7)
Mean daily maximum °C (°F)	10.6 (51.1)	11.4 (52.5)	13.9 (57.0)	17.4 (63.3)	20.9 (69.6)	23.3 (73.9)	26.8 (80.2)	28.6 (83.5)	26.3 (79.3)	22.1 (71.8)	18.2 (64.8)	13.4 (56.1)	19.4 (66.9)
Daily mean °C (°F)	8.5 (47.3)	9.1 (48.4)	11.4 (52.5)	15.0 (59.0)	18.6 (65.5)	21.2 (70.2)	24.6 (76.3)	26.3 (79.3)	24.1 (75.4)	20.0 (68.0)	16.1 (61.0)	11.2 (52.2)	17.2 (62.9)
Mean daily minimum °C (°F)	6.3 (43.3)	6.6 (43.9)	8.7 (47.7)	12.6 (54.7)	16.4 (61.5)	19.5 (67.1)	23.0 (73.4)	24.5 (76.1)	22.2 (72.0)	18.1 (64.6)	13.9 (57.0)	9.0 (48.2)	15.1 (59.1)
Record low °C (°F)	−0.8 (30.6)	−0.6 (30.9)	1.2 (34.2)	2.2 (36.0)	9.8 (49.6)	14.0 (57.2)	17.9 (64.2)	18.7 (65.7)	15.3 (59.5)	11.9 (53.4)	5.0 (41.0)	1.0 (33.8)	−0.8 (30.6)
Average precipitation mm (inches)	98.5 (3.88)	128.0 (5.04)	198.8 (7.83)	170.5 (6.71)	183.4 (7.22)	262.8 (10.35)	189.4 (7.46)	197.1 (7.76)	208.1 (8.19)	334.0 (13.15)	174.4 (6.87)	126.3 (4.97)	2,271.3 (89.42)
Average precipitation days (≥ 1.0 mm)	8.1	9.6	12.1	10.6	10.1	13.3	9.4	8.2	11.8	12.4	10.9	8.9	125.4
Source: JMA

== Important Bird Area ==
The island has been recognised as an Important Bird Area (IBA) by BirdLife International because it supports populations of Japanese wood pigeons, Tristram's storm petrels, Japanese murrelets, Ijima's leaf-warblers, Pleske's grasshopper warblers and Izu thrushes.

== History ==
Kōzu-shima has been inhabited since at least the Japanese Paleolithic era, and archaeologists have found Jōmon period stone tools made from obsidian in Shizuoka and Yamanashi Prefectures. Under the Ritsuryō system of the early Nara period, the island was part of Suruga Province. It was transferred to Izu Province when Izu separated from Suruga in 680 AD. During the Heian period, obsidian was the primary export from the island.

== In popular culture ==
The island is the hometown of the idol duet Sunny Passion in the franchise Love Live! Superstar!!. Several episodes of the corresponding anime TV series take place there.

In the film Weathering with You, Hodaka Morishima (the male protagonist) is from the island.

In Godzilla Minus Zero, Godzilla re-emerges off the coast of the island.

== See also ==
- List of islands of Japan
- List of volcanoes in Japan
