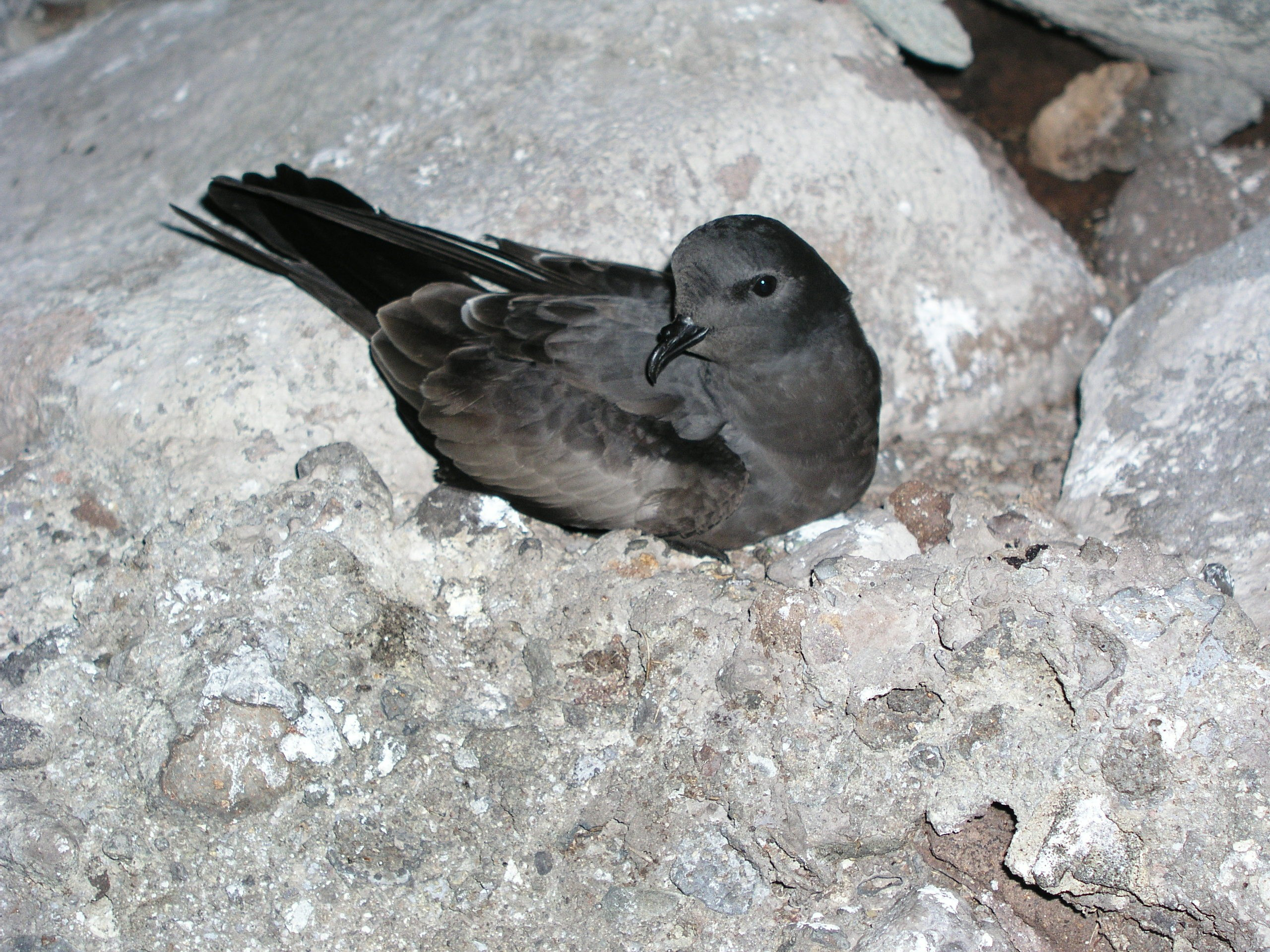
- Photographed on Nihoa Island

Conservation status
- Least Concern (IUCN 3.1)

Scientific classification
- Kingdom: Animalia
- Phylum: Chordata
- Class: Aves
- Order: Procellariiformes
- Family: Hydrobatidae
- Genus: Hydrobates
- Species: H. tristrami

Binomial name
- Hydrobates tristrami (Salvin, 1896)

Synonyms
- Oceanodroma tristrami

= Tristram's storm petrel =

Species of bird

Tristram's storm petrel or ʻakihikeʻehiʻale (Hydrobates tristrami) is a species of seabird in the storm petrel family Hydrobatidae. The species' common and scientific name is derived from the English clergyman Henry Baker Tristram; the species can also be known as the sooty storm petrel. Tristram's storm petrel has a distribution across the north Pacific Ocean, predominantly in tropical seas.

This storm petrel has long, angular wings. This is likely the largest member of the storm petrel family, with a total length 24.5 to 27 cm (9.6 to 10.6 in), a wingspan of 54 to 57 cm (21 to 22 in) and a body mass of 71 to 120 g (2.5 to 4.2 oz) with average weights of 86.2 and 92 g (3.04 and 3.25 oz). Its plumage is all over dark with a slightly pale rump and a pale grey bar on the upper wing. The bill is stout as this is a species which feeds on small cephalopods. The species is colonial, nesting in the Northwest Hawaiian Islands, and in several small islands south of Japan, including the Bonin Islands and Izu. Colonies are attended at night, and the species breeds during the winter. At sea, the species is pelagic, feeding on squid and fish.

Tristram's storm petrel is considered near threatened. All of its breeding colonies in Hawaii are protected areas, but the species has undergone declines in the past due to introduced rats on Torishima Island.

In the early 21st century, the Tristam's storm petrel were included in a study of plastic ingestion by birds, at Tern Island in the French Frigate Shoals.

The species is named after Reverend Henry Baker Tristram, who also collected natural history specimens.

== Taxonomy ==
The holotype specimen of Oceanodroma tristrami Salvin (Cat.Bds.Brit.Mus., 25,1896, p.347) is held in the vertebrate zoology collection of World Museum, National Museums Liverpool, with accession number NML-VZ T9781. The specimen was collected by Lieutenant Gunn at Sendai Bay, Japan, July 1874, and came to the Liverpool national collection through the purchase of Henry Baker Tristram's collection. It was formerly defined in the genus Oceanodroma before that genus was synonymized with Hydrobates.
