= Tori-shima (Izu Islands) =

Japanese uninhabited volcanic island

Native name: 鳥島
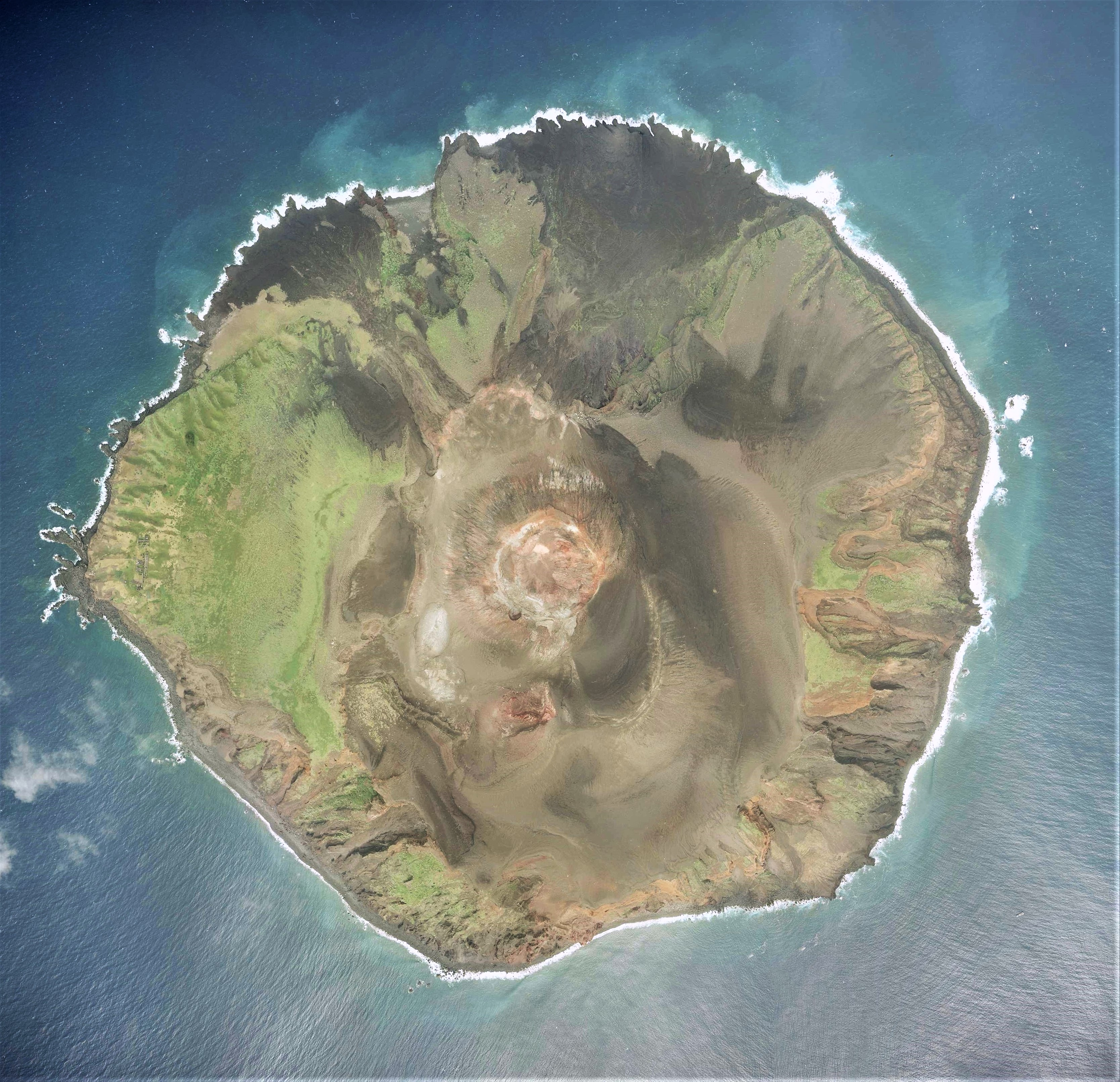
- Tori-shima, aerial photograph, 2001

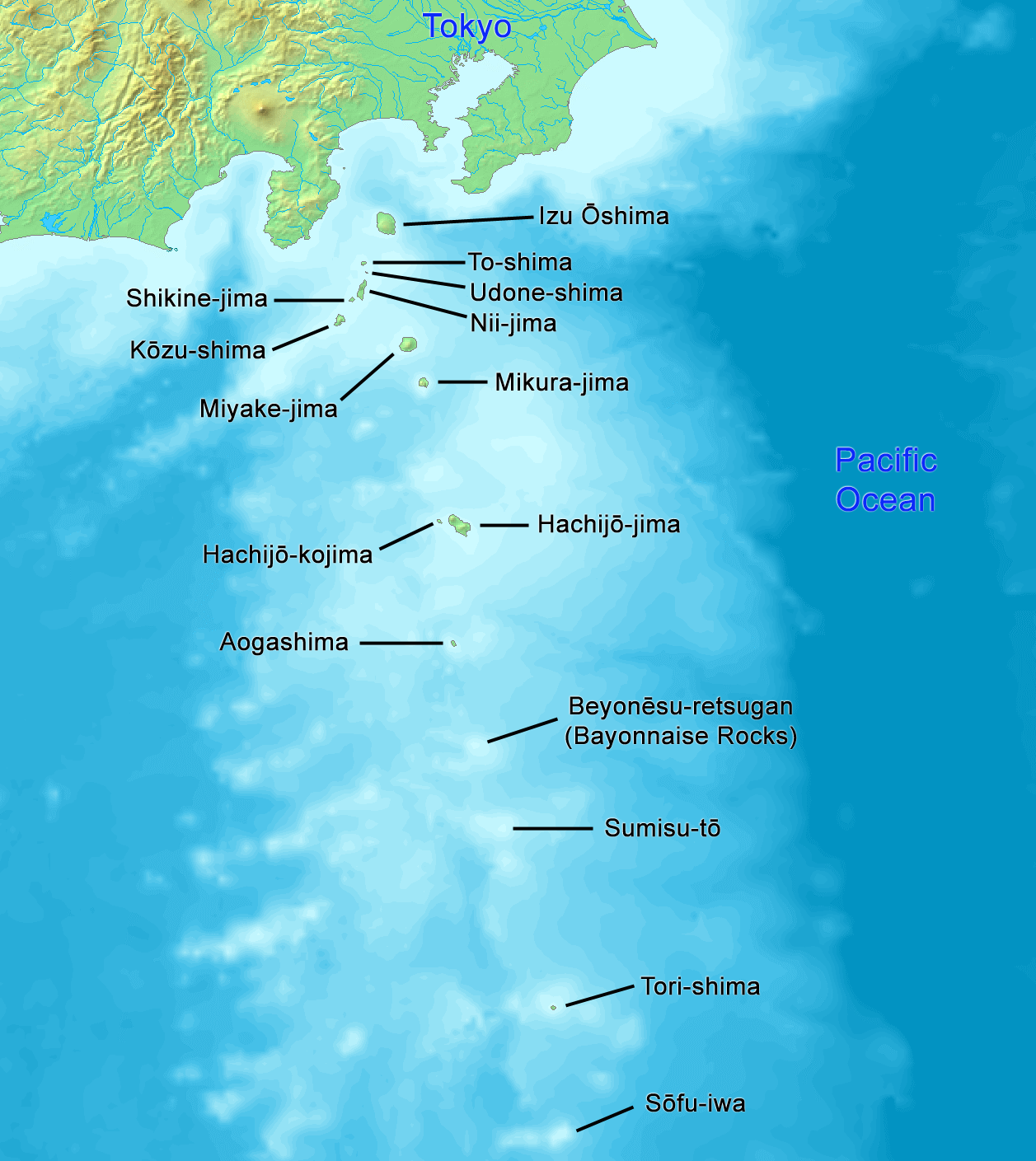

Geography
- Location: Izu Islands
- Coordinates: 30°29′02″N 140°18′11″E
- Archipelago: Izu Islands
- Area: 4.79 km^{2} (1.85 sq mi)
- Coastline: 6.5 km (4.04 mi)
- Highest elevation: 394 m (1293 ft)

Administration
- Japan
- Prefecture: Tokyo
- Subprefecture: Hachijō Subprefecture

Demographics
- Population: 0

Tori-shima (Japanese: 鳥島, Hepburn: Tori-shima) 'Bird Island', or Izu-Torishima (Japanese: 伊豆鳥島, Hepburn: Izu-Torishima) 'Bird Island of Izu Province') is an uninhabited Japanese island in the Pacific Ocean. The volcanic island is part of the Izu Islands.

== Geography ==
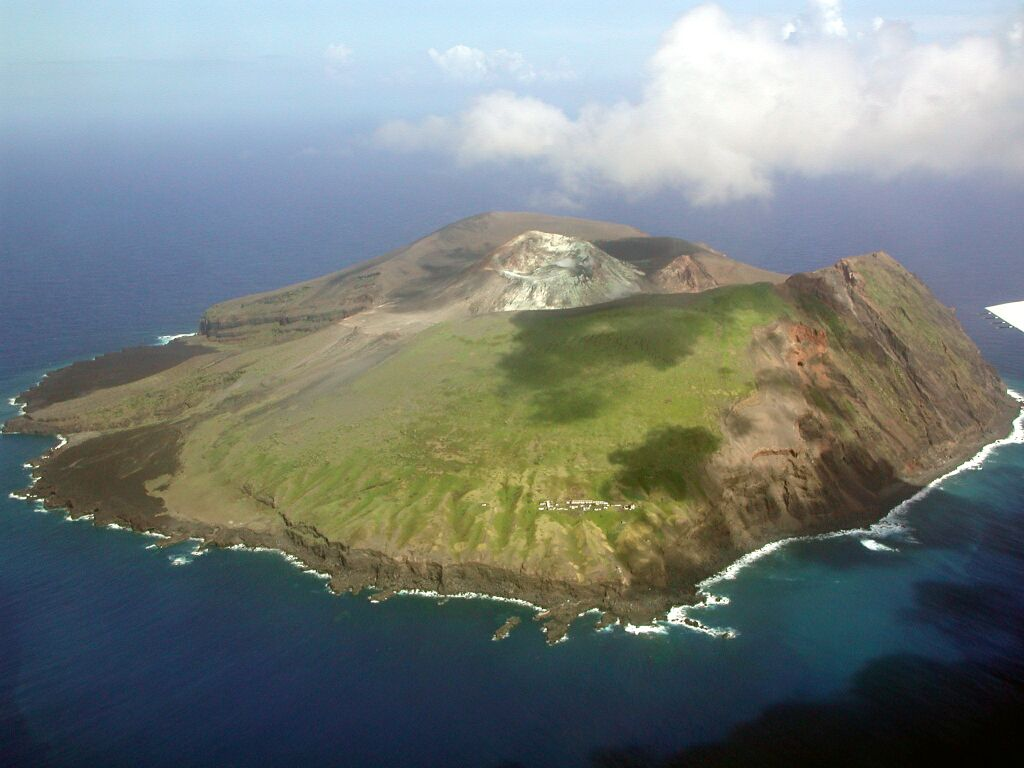
Izu-Torishima Island seen from the west, 2002

Tori-shima is located in the Philippine Sea approximately 600 km (373 mi) south of Tokyo and 76 km (47 mi) north of Lot's Wife. The roughly circular-shaped island is listed as a Class A active volcano by the Japan Meteorological Agency. The island is the above-water portion of a submarine volcano, whose submerged caldera portion to the north of the island continues to erupt underwater. Volcanic activity on the island itself was last recorded in 2002, accompanied by earthquake swarms. The main peak on the island, Iō-yama (硫黄山), has a height of 394 m (1,293 ft), and the island has a circumference of 6.5 km (4.0 mi). The total area of the island is 4.79 km^{2} (1.85 sq mi).

== History ==
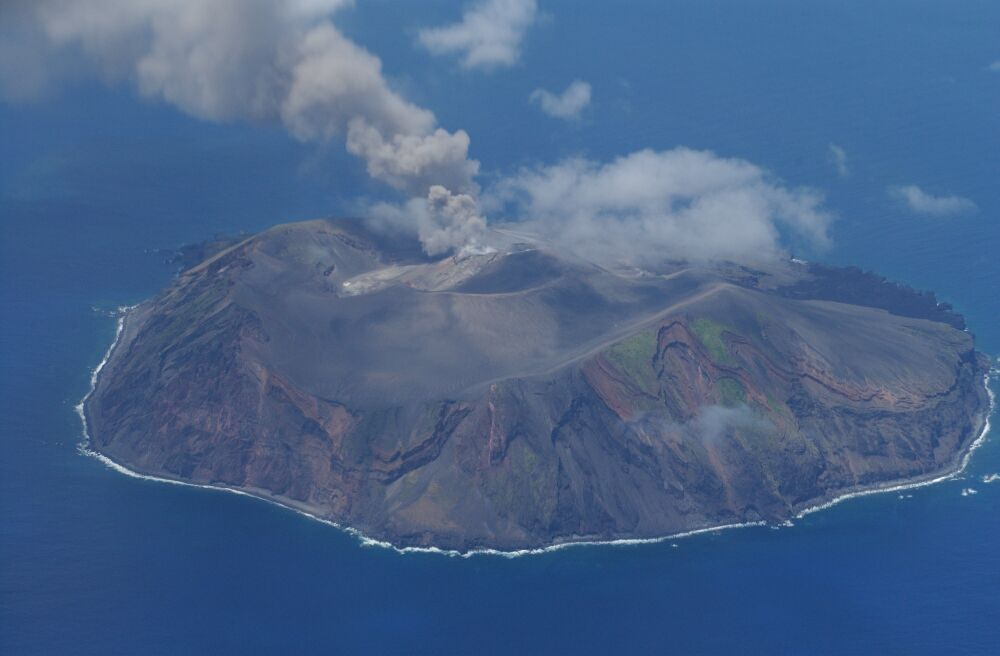
Eruption of the island in 2002

Tori-shima was known to Japanese fishermen and mariners since at least the early Edo period, but was uninhabited aside from occasional shipwreck survivors. In 1841, 14-year-old Nakahama Manjirō and four friends were shipwrecked on Tori-shima until rescued by the American whaleship John Howland commanded by William H. Whitfield. Japanese writer Akira Yoshimura researched and wrote about 15 similar instances. The island was settled in Meiji period, with the primary economic activity being the gathering of guano from the abundant short-tailed albatross, who use the island as their nesting grounds. The short-tailed albatross were also harvested for their feathers. The key figure in albatross culling was the businessman Han-emon Tamaoki (1830–1911). He landed on Tori-shima in 1886 and established Tamaoki Shokai (Tamaoki Company) the next year. He carried out a systematic feather harvesting until he withdrew from the island in 1922. An estimated 5 million birds were killed and led to the near-extinction of the species. A major volcanic eruption was recorded in 1871. The island was administratively grouped with the Ogasawara islands in August 1898, but was transferred to the administration of Hachijojima in April 1901. The population of 150 inhabitants was killed by a major volcanic eruption in August 1902. Torishima was never repopulated.

Since the 1930s, the Yamashina Institute for Ornithology has taken a very active role in researching and attempting to preserve the local seabird species, especially the short-tailed albatross, which had been reduced to an estimated 50 birds by 1933. The Japan Meteorological Agency established a weather station and volcanic research station on the island in 1947, but this was abandoned in 1965 due to volcanic activity and earthquakes. On November 1, 1954 Tori-shima was proclaimed a protected bird sanctuary. This designation was increased to that of a protected national natural monument on May 10, 1965. It can only be visited by research scientists with special permission, and landing on the island is very difficult due to heavy seas and lack of suitable landing beaches or facilities. Tour boats which take people around the island to view the birds are popular, but these tours are not permitted to land on the island. Researchers normally travel to the island by chartered government helicopter.

Tori-shima, along with the other Izu Islands, is officially part of Tokyo Metropolis, and also falls within the borders of the Fuji-Hakone-Izu National Park.

== Flora and fauna ==
Repeated volcanic eruptions in 1939 and 2002 have set the flora on Tori-shima back to initial stages in the ecological succession. Plants such as Vitex rotundifolia and hydrangea are found near the shoreline, and Chrysanthemum pacificum and Japanese black pine in sheltered areas inland, but most of the central portion of the island remains as volcanic ash and rock.

The island is home to several tens of thousands of breeding pairs of Tristram's storm petrel and other birds such as Japanese murrelet, black-footed albatross, common kestrel, and blue rock thrush, but the short-tailed albatross population has been very slow to recover, with recovery hampered by the presence of large numbers of black rats, the only remaining mammal on the island, eating bird eggs. Humpback whales and dolphins often appear around the island during migration and breeding seasons. Tori-shima is the primary and one of only two remaining breeding sites for the short-tailed albatross. The island has been recognised as an Important Bird Area (IBA) by BirdLife International.

== See also ==
- List of volcanoes in Japan
- List of islands of Japan
- List of islands
- Desert island
