= Myōjin-shō =

Submarine volcano south of Tokyo on the Izu-Ogasawara Ridge

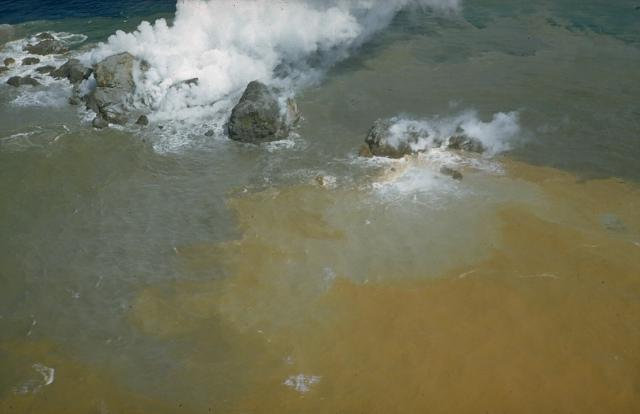
- Steam pours from the blocky summit of a lava dome formed at Myōjin-shō during a submarine eruption at the Bayonnaise Rocks volcano in 1952.
- Summit depth: 11 metres (36 ft)

Location
- Group: Izu Islands
- Coordinates: 31°55.1′N 140°1.3′E
- Country: Japan

Geology
- Type: lava dome
- Last eruption: 1970; 56 years ago

Myōjin-shō (明神礁) is a submarine volcano located about 450 kilometers south of Tokyo on the Izu-Ogasawara Ridge in the Izu Islands. Volcanic activity has been detected there since 1869. Since then it has undergone more eruptions, the most powerful of which resulted in the appearance and disappearance of a small island.

The name Myōjin-shō derives from a fishing boat, No.11 Myōjin-Maru of Yaizu City, Shizuoka Prefecture, the crew of which first witnessed the major volcanic eruption of 1952. Myōjin itself refers to 'shining deity' or 'illuminating deity' in reference to the Kami.

== Eruption of 1952-1953 ==
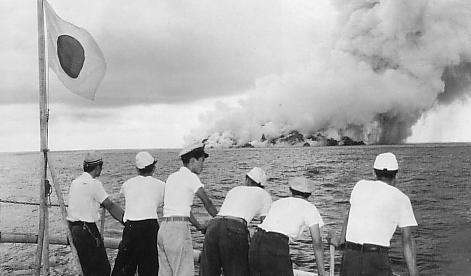
A mysterious reef raised a volcanic plume and "Chihuri-class patrol vessel" sailors looked at it (1952)

The volcanic eruption from 1952 to 1953 was one of its biggest eruptions on record, with the repetitious appearance and disappearance of an island, which at one point reached over ten metres above sea level, before sinking after a major volcanic eruption in September 1953. On September 24, 1952, a survey vessel, Kaiyo Maru No. 5 of the Hydrographic Department of the Maritime Safety Agency, was destroyed by the volcano, with the loss of its crew of 31 (including the nine scientists studying the eruption). Consequently, the Department developed Manbou (Sunfish), an unmanned radio operating survey boat, and has used it for the research of dangerous sea areas such as submarine volcanoes.

The eruption was the first correlation of strong, unusual signals in the SOFAR channel recorded on September 18, 1952 at the Navy's California SOFAR stations at Point Sur and Point Arena with a volcanic eruption. The station at Kaneohe, Hawaii had not detected the signals indicating its source was west of 180º with a line of position obtained from the two California stations passing through a point about 200 nautical miles south of Tokyo. News reports of the volcano's violent eruption focused attention on the details and an effort to precisely time the volcano's activity by the recordings at the SOFAR stations. By doing so the activity was detailed and the most likely time Kaiyo Maru No. 5 was destroyed.

== Survey of 1998-1999 ==
In 1998 and 1999, the Hydrography Department conducted comprehensive sea bottom surveys around Myōjin-shō, using the state-of-the-art survey vessel Shoyo and Manbou II, the second generation Manbou. As a result of these surveys, a detailed picture of the seabed topography around Myōjin-shō was made for the first time.

Manbou II conducted the survey of the sea area within a radius of 3 nautical miles (about 5.4 kilometers) of Myōjin-shō. Shoyo conducted the survey of the sea area within a radius of about 10 nautical miles (about 18.5 kilometers) but farther than the area of the radius of 3 nautical miles (5.6 km). Manbou II works by the order of preprogrammed instructions and measures depth and water temperature. Bathymetric survey of Manbou II was carried out by using the "PRD-601" echo sounder at intervals of 0.2 nautical miles (about 370 meters). Shoyo conducted a comprehensive survey including the geological and geophysical surveys of sea bottom. Bathymetric survey of Shoyo was carried out by using a "Seabeam 2112" echo sounder at intervals of 0.5 nautical miles (about 930 meters).

== Structure ==
Previously, Myōjin-shō was considered to be the central cone of a double volcano with the Bayonnaise Rocks (rocks of 9.9 meters in height above the sea level) as a portion of the somma (Mita, 1949). As a result of the survey, however, the authors found that both Myōjin-shō and the Bayonnaise Rocks are cones on the somma of a double volcano. The foot of this double volcano lies 1,400 to 1,500 meters in depth and the size is about 30 by 25 kilometers east-west, north-south. The somma is almost a circle in the diameter of 7 by 9 kilometers and the height is 1,000 – 1,400meters.

The diameter of the caldera floor is 5.6 kilometers and about 1,100 meters in depth. The central cone is a height formerly known as Takane-shō, 328 metres below sea level.

Myōjin-shō is a post caldera cone formed in the northeastern part of the somma of the double volcano. It is a single conical cone and its height is 550 meters with the shallowest depth 50 meters. A record that suggests a gushing of bubbles near the summit was obtained and micro-earthquakes were observed near Myōjin-shō, showing that the volcano is still active, although at a low level

== Gallery ==
=== 1952 eruption ===
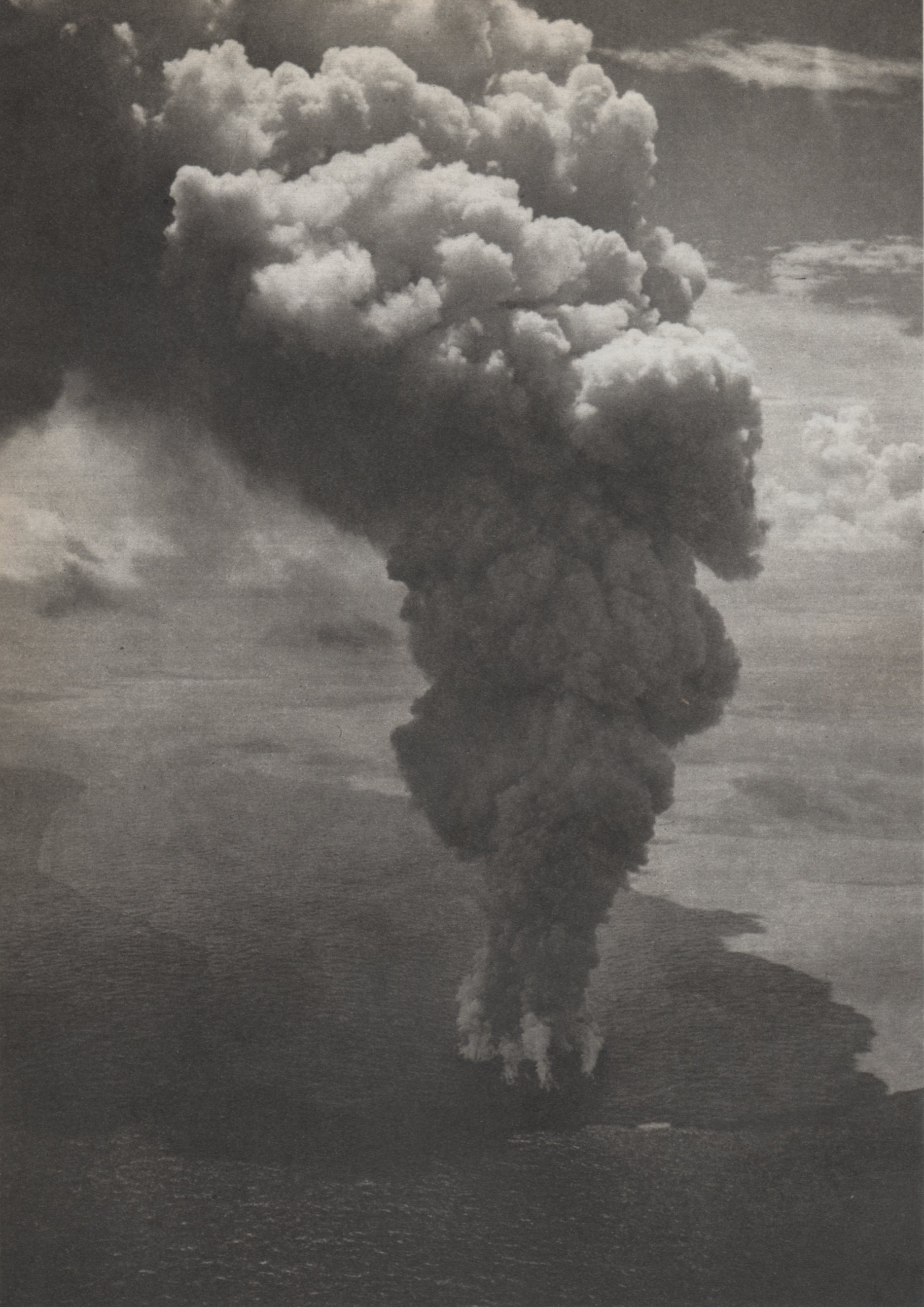
Myōjin-shō, 1952

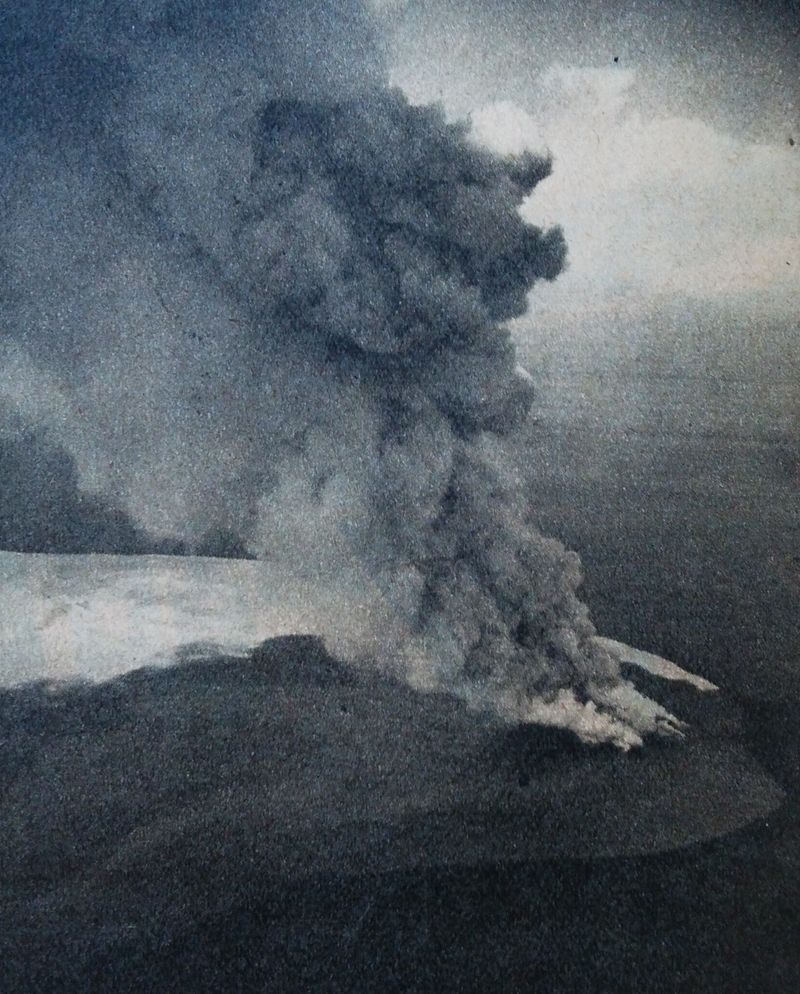
Myōjin-shō, 1952
