= Kaiyō No.1-class oceanographic research ship =

Class of Japanese ships, built 1939 to 1943

Class overview
- Name: 200-ton oceanographic research ship
- Builders: Mitsubishi Heavy Industries, Shimonoseki shipyard
- Operators: Ministry of the Navy of Japan; Ministry of Transport; Japan Maritime Safety Agency
- Preceded by: Tenkai No. 1 as IJN
- Succeeded by: JCG Kaiyō as JMSA
- Built: 1939–1943
- In commission: 1938–1964
- Planned: 6
- Completed: 6
- Lost: 5
- Retired: 1

General characteristics
- Type: Oceanographic research ship
- Displacement: 200 long tons (203 t) gross; 277 long tons (281 t) standing
- Length: 37.0 m (121 ft 5 in) overall
- Beam: 6.8 m (22 ft 4 in)
- Draught: 2.3 m (7 ft 7 in)
- Draft: 3.3 m (10 ft 10 in)
- Propulsion: 1 × intermediate diesel, single shaft, 400 bhp
- Speed: 11 knots (13 mph; 20 km/h)
- Range: 7,000 nmi (13,000 km) at 10 kn (12 mph; 19 km/h)
- Complement: 44 in 1944
- Armament: Type 93 13.2 mm (0.52 in) AA gun; Type 92 7.7 mm machine gun; some depth charges

The Kaiyō No. 1-class oceanographic research ship (第一海洋型海洋観測船,, Daiichi Kaiyō-gata Kaiyō-kansokusen) was a class of oceanographic research ship/weather ship of the Imperial Japanese Navy (IJN), serving during World War II. The IJN official designation was 200-ton oceanographic research ship (二〇〇瓲海洋観測船,, 200-ton Kaiyō-kansokusen).

== Construction ==
In 1938, the IJN wanted to investigate the weather and ocean currents in a potential future battlefield. Kaiyō No. 1-class ships were built for the purpose. The IJN made Hokkaido Fisheries Research Institute San'yō Maru a sample for the Kaiyō No. 1. All ships were deployed in the Hydrographic Department, and they were directly controlled by the Naval Ministry. Therefore, being government ships, they raised civil ensign, not the naval ensign. The crew were civil servants except for several warrant officers.

All sister ships were built by Mitsubishi Heavy Industries at Shimonoseki shipyard.

== Ships in classes ==
Ship	Laid down	Launched	Completed	Fate
Kaiyō No. 1 (第一海洋,, Daiichi Kaiyō)	1 March 1939	1 July 1939	9 October 1939	Sunk by air raid off Derawan Island 02°18′N 118°15′E on 19 October 1944.
Kaiyō No. 2 (第二海洋,, Daini Kaiyō)	1 July 1939	4 October 1939	23 December 1939	Sunk by Hr. Ms. Zwaardvisch off Rembang 06°30′S 111°35′E on 15 October 1944.
Kaiyō No. 3 (第三海洋,, Daisan Kaiyō)	3 March 1941	22 October 1941	17 June 1942	Missing in action in late 1944; removed from naval ship list on 29 October 1944.
Kaiyō No. 4 (第四海洋,, Daiyon Kaiyō)	23 May 1941	20 January 1942	17 July 1942	Survived war at Uraga; transferred to Ministry of Transport on 29 November 1945; transferred to Maritime Safety Agency on 1 May 1948 (hull number HG-01, later HM-01); renamed Kaiyō Maru No. 4 (第四海洋丸,, Daiyon Kaiyō Maru) on 20 October 1949; renamed Kaiyō (海洋) on 15 December 1956; retired on 26 March 1964.
Kaiyō No. 5 (第五海洋,, Daigo Kaiyō)	6 April 1942	12 November 1942	28 February 1943	Survived war at Kasaoka; transferred to Ministry of Transport on 29 November 1945; transferred to Maritime Safety Agency on 1 May 1948 (hull number HG-02, later HM-02); renamed Kaiyō Maru No. 5 (第五海洋丸,, Daigo Kaiyō Maru) on 20 October 1949; sunk by jets of water and tephra from the eruption of Myōjin-shō on 24 September 1952; struck on 27 April 1953.
Kaiyō No. 6 (第六海洋,, Dairoku Kaiyō)	6 April 1942	12 December 1942	31 March 1943	Sunk by USS Gabilan off Muroto 32°50′N 134°21′E on 31 October 1944.

== See also ==
Ministry of the Navy of Japan
