= Kōzushima, Tokyo =

Kōzushima 神津島村
- Village
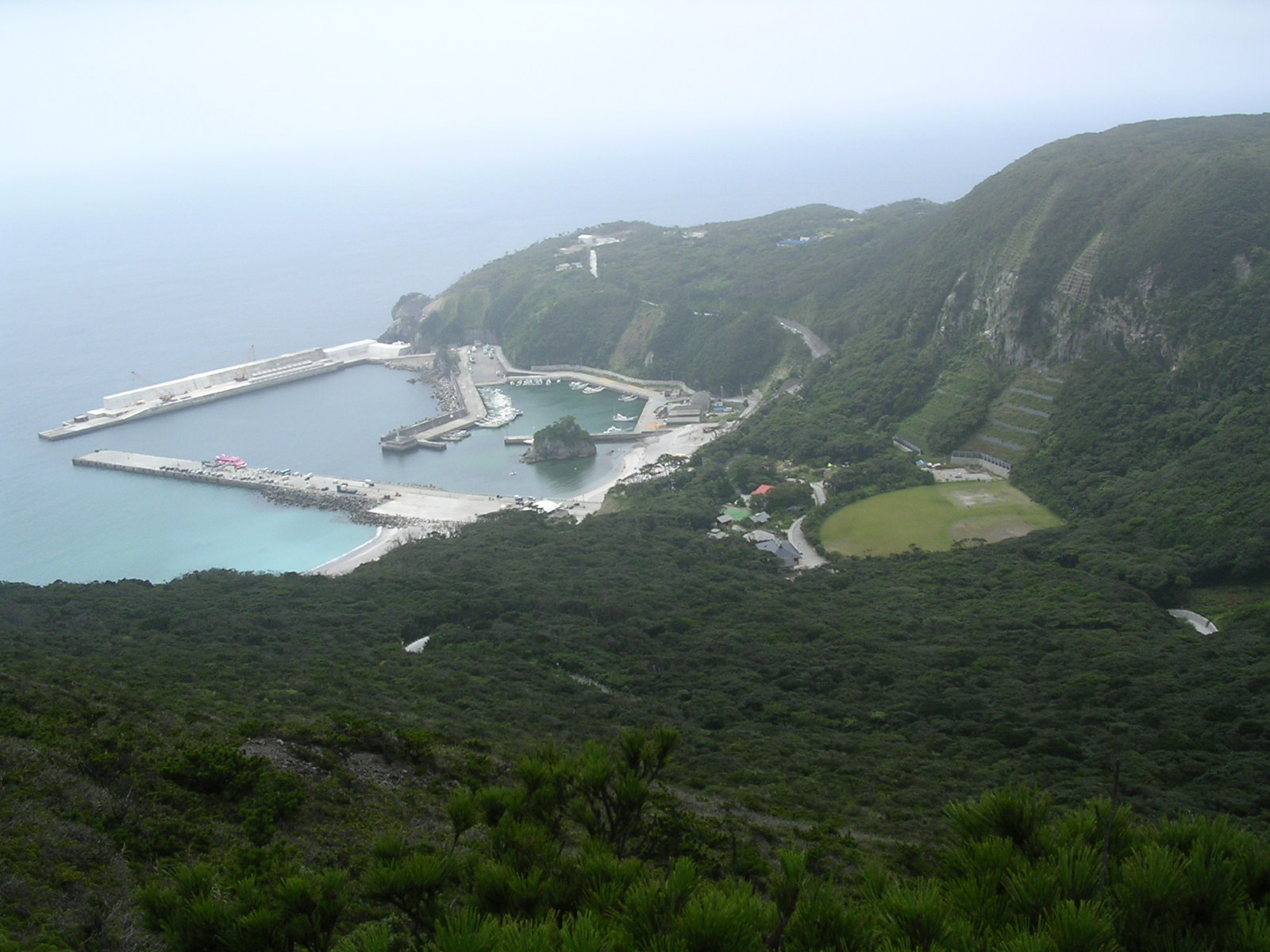

- Flag Seal

- Location of Kōzushima in Tokyo Metropolis

- Coordinates: 34°12′19.1″N 139°08′3.8″E
- Country: Japan
- Region: Kantō
- Prefecture: Tokyo Metropolis

Area
  - Total: 18.58 km^{2} (7.17 sq mi)

Population (June 2022)
  - Total: 1,841
  - Density: 99/km^{2} (260/sq mi)
- Time zone: UTC+9 (Japan Standard Time)
- Phone number: 04992-8-0011
- Address: 904, Kōzushima-mura, Tōkyō-to 100-0601
- Climate: Cfa
- Website: vill.kouzushima.tokyo.jp

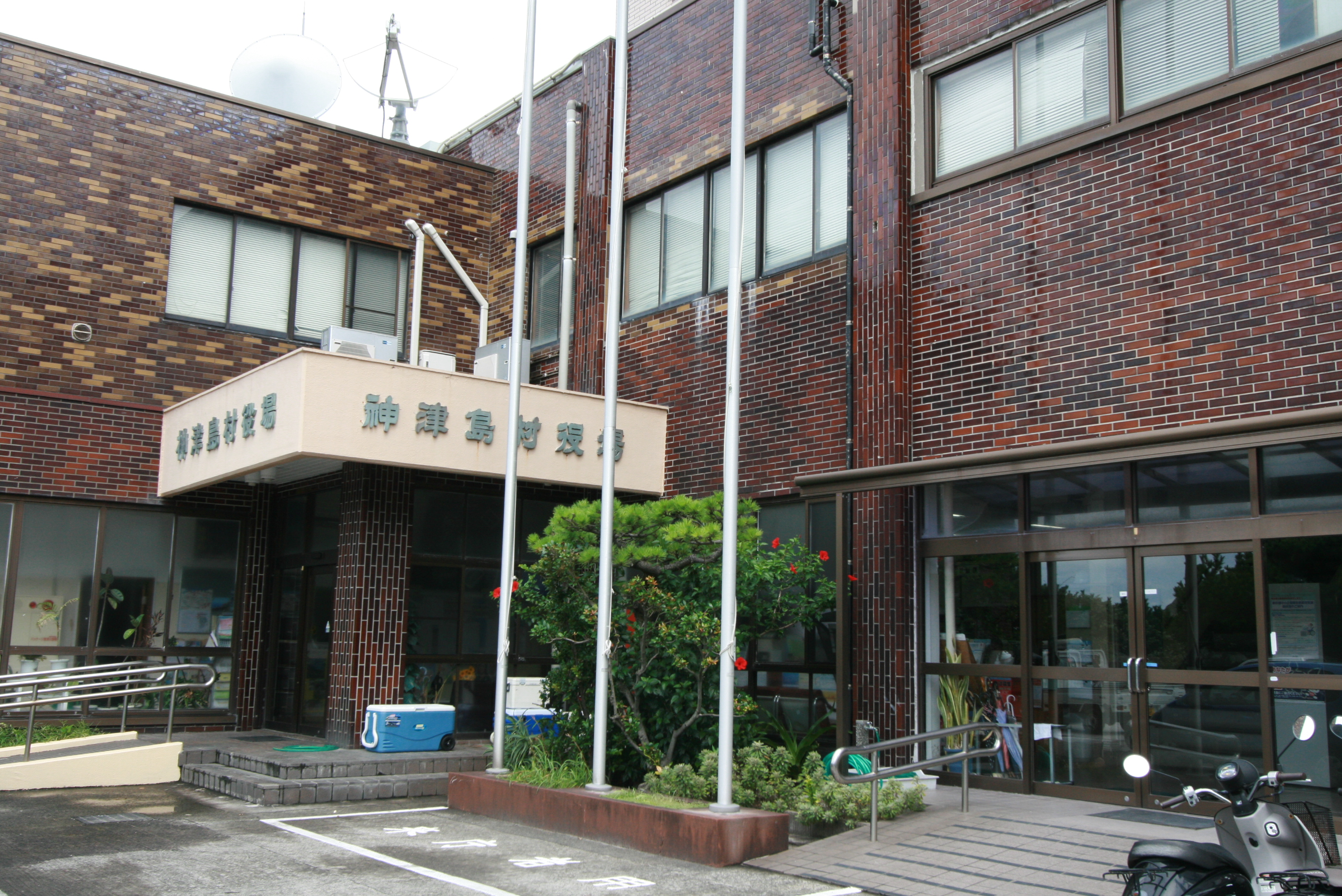
Kozushima Village Hall

Kōzushima Village (神津島村, Kōzushima-mura) is a village located in Ōshima Subprefecture, Tokyo Metropolis, Japan. As of 1 June 2022, the village had an estimated population of 1,841, and a population density of 99 persons per km^{2}. Its total area is 18.58 square kilometres (7.17 sq mi).

== Geography ==
Kōzushima Village covers the islands of Kōzu-shima, one of the northern islands in the Izu archipelago in the Philippine Sea, 178 kilometres (111 mi) south of central Tokyo. Warmed by the Kuroshio Current, the town has a warmer and wetter climate than central Tokyo.

=== Neighboring municipalities ===
- Tokyo Metropolis
  - Niijima, Tokyo
  - Mikurajima, Tokyo

=== Climate ===
Climate data for Kōzu-shima (2003−2020 normals, extremes 2003−present)
Month	Jan	Feb	Mar	Apr	May	Jun	Jul	Aug	Sep	Oct	Nov	Dec	Year
Record high °C (°F)	18.1 (64.6)	19.3 (66.7)	20.8 (69.4)	23.2 (73.8)	25.6 (78.1)	28.5 (83.3)	33.7 (92.7)	32.5 (90.5)	31.0 (87.8)	28.7 (83.7)	24.1 (75.4)	22.7 (72.9)	33.7 (92.7)
Mean daily maximum °C (°F)	10.6 (51.1)	11.4 (52.5)	13.9 (57.0)	17.4 (63.3)	20.9 (69.6)	23.3 (73.9)	26.8 (80.2)	28.6 (83.5)	26.3 (79.3)	22.1 (71.8)	18.2 (64.8)	13.4 (56.1)	19.4 (66.9)
Daily mean °C (°F)	8.5 (47.3)	9.1 (48.4)	11.4 (52.5)	15.0 (59.0)	18.6 (65.5)	21.2 (70.2)	24.6 (76.3)	26.3 (79.3)	24.1 (75.4)	20.0 (68.0)	16.1 (61.0)	11.2 (52.2)	17.2 (62.9)
Mean daily minimum °C (°F)	6.3 (43.3)	6.6 (43.9)	8.7 (47.7)	12.6 (54.7)	16.4 (61.5)	19.5 (67.1)	23.0 (73.4)	24.5 (76.1)	22.2 (72.0)	18.1 (64.6)	13.9 (57.0)	9.0 (48.2)	15.1 (59.1)
Record low °C (°F)	−0.8 (30.6)	−0.6 (30.9)	1.2 (34.2)	2.2 (36.0)	9.8 (49.6)	14.0 (57.2)	17.9 (64.2)	18.7 (65.7)	15.3 (59.5)	11.9 (53.4)	5.0 (41.0)	1.0 (33.8)	−0.8 (30.6)
Average precipitation mm (inches)	98.5 (3.88)	128.0 (5.04)	198.8 (7.83)	170.5 (6.71)	183.4 (7.22)	262.8 (10.35)	189.4 (7.46)	197.1 (7.76)	208.1 (8.19)	334.0 (13.15)	174.4 (6.87)	126.3 (4.97)	2,271.3 (89.42)
Average precipitation days (≥ 1.0 mm)	8.1	9.6	12.1	10.6	10.1	13.3	9.4	8.2	11.8	12.4	10.9	8.9	125.4
Source: JMA

== Demographics ==
Per Japanese census data, the population of Kōzushima has declined in recent decades, since 1990.

Historical population
Year	Pop.	±%
1980	2,210	—
1990	2,314	+4.7%
2000	2,144	−7.3%
2010	1,889	−11.9%
2020	1,855	−1.8%

== History ==
Kōzushima Village was founded on October 1, 1923, when the Izu islands were administratively divided into villages and towns.

== Economy ==
The village economy is dominated by commercial fishing and seasonal tourism. There is also some small-scale farming. In the middle of the 20th century, unsuccessful attempts were made to develop silkworm farming. Many tourists come for sports fishing and scuba diving. Its white sandy beaches make it an excellent place to swim in summer, since it receives considerably fewer visitors than the other islands in the Izu chain. There are many hiking courses around Kōzu-shima's volcano, Tenjō-san, which dominates the center of the island. However, winter visits are discouraged, cancellation of flights and ferries due to inclement weather can strand visitors. The island is also noted for its local Shōchū.

== Transportation ==
Kōzushima is accessible by ferry from mainland Tokyo, Shimoda, Shizuoka, or other Izu Islands. There are also daily flights from Chōfu Airport, in western Tokyo to Kozushima Airport.

== Education ==
The village operates one public elementary and one public middle school.

- Kozushima Junior High School (神津島村立神津中学校)
- Kozushima Elementary School (神津島村立神津小学校)

Tokyo Metropolitan Government Board of Education operates Kōzu High School, the only high school in the village.

== Gallery ==
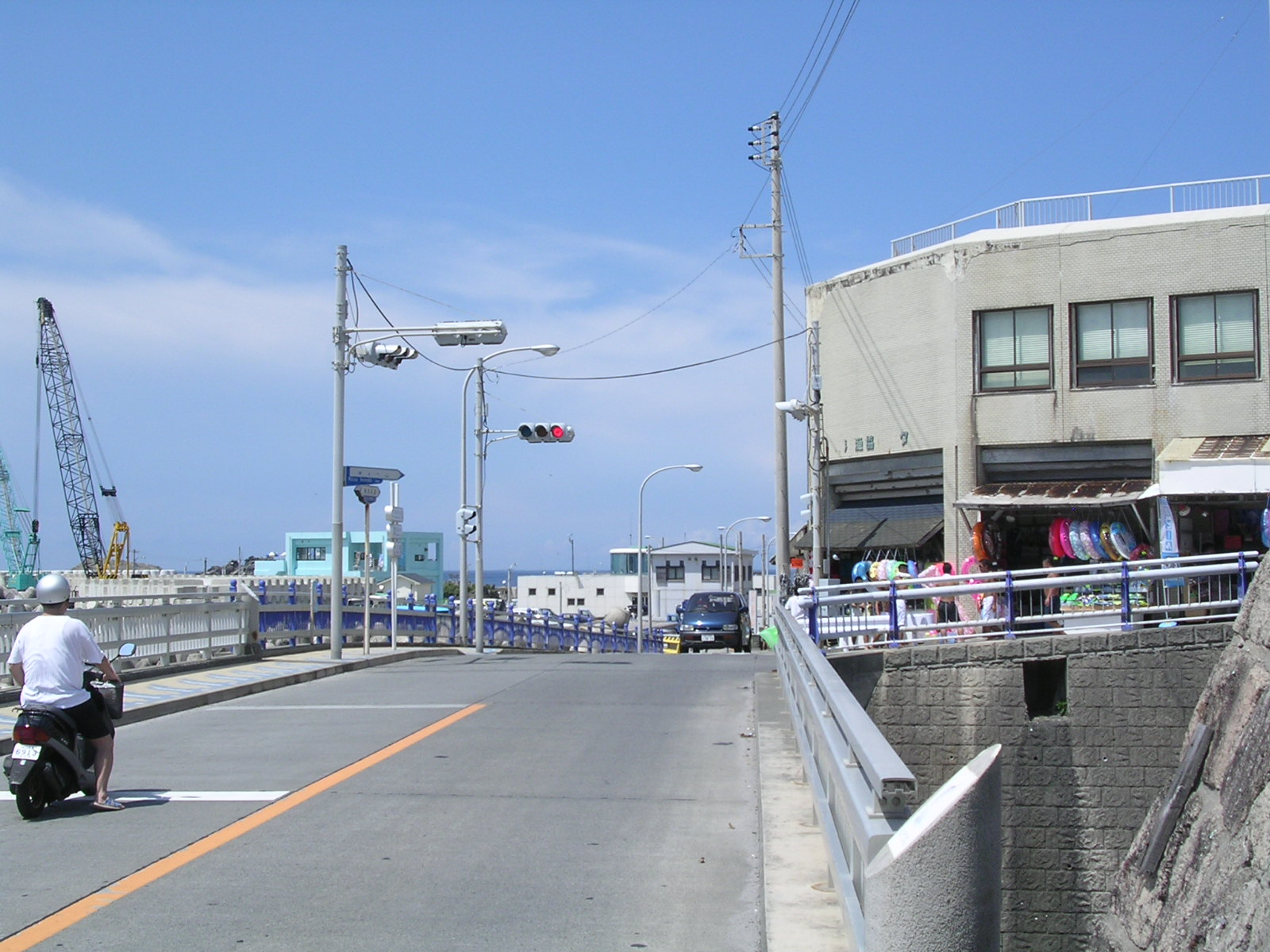
Kōzushima port

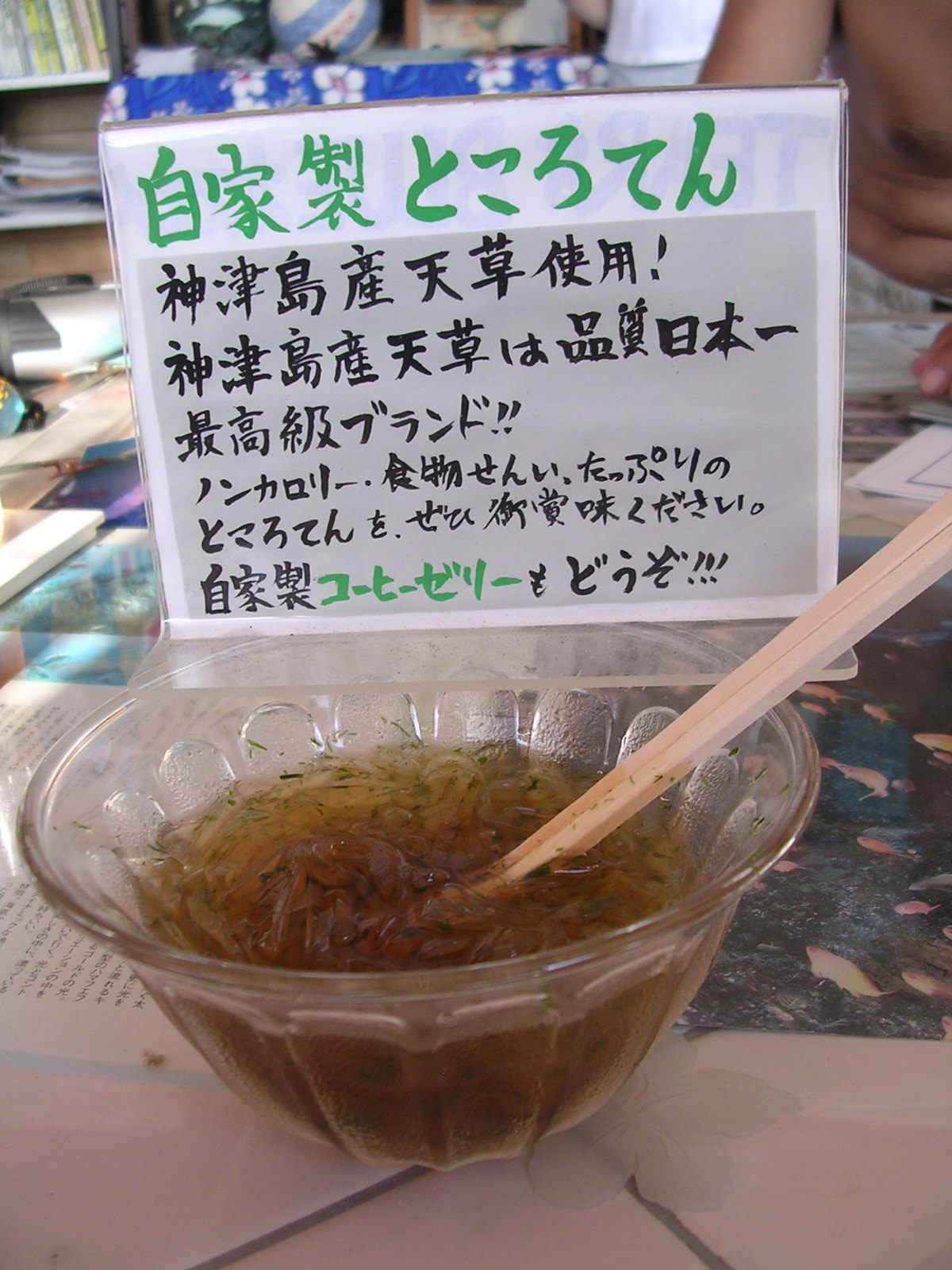
Tokoroten, a local specialty

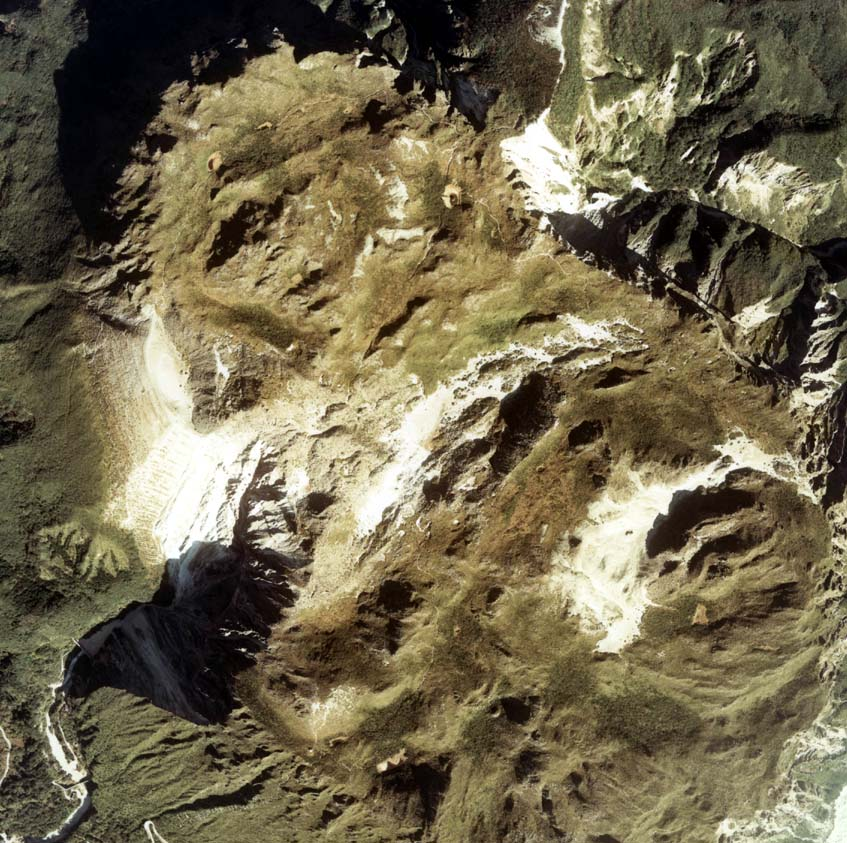
Tenjōsan, highest mountain

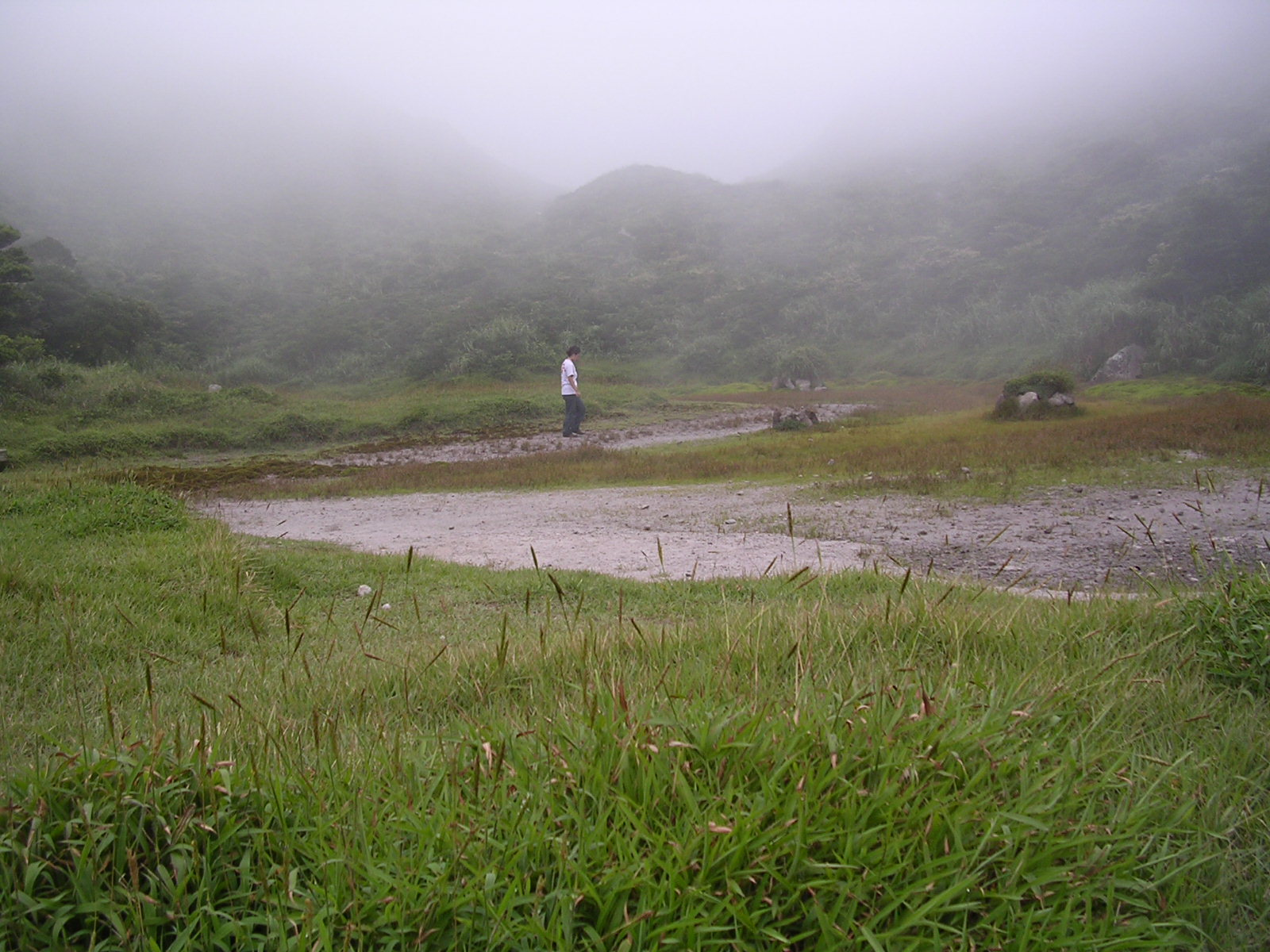
On the top of Tenjōsan

== See also ==
- Izu Islands
