= Ōshima Subprefecture (Tokyo) =

Subprefecture of Tokyo Metropolis, Japan

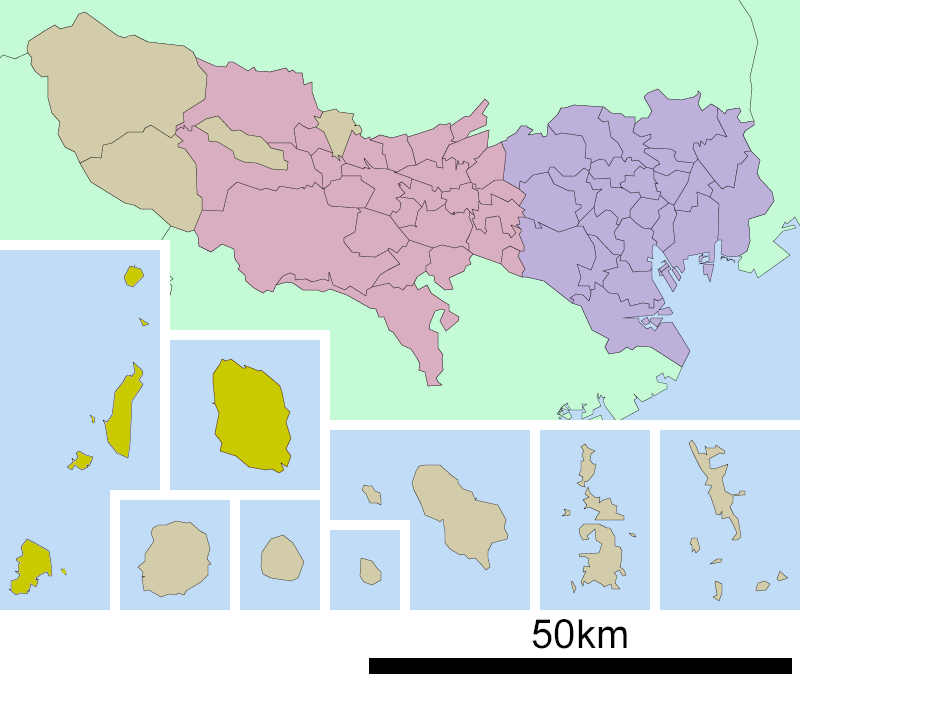
Ōshima Subprefecture in Tokyo Metropolis (labelled in yellow)

Ōshima Subprefecture (大島支庁, Ōshima-shichō) is a subprefecture of Tokyo Metropolis, Japan. It is administered by the Bureau Of General Affairs of the Tokyo Metropolitan Government.

It includes the following towns and villages on the Izu Islands:

- Ōshima (town on Izu Ōshima)
- Toshima (village on Toshima)
- Niijima (village on Niijima and Shikinejima)
- Kōzushima (village on Kōzushima)

It covers 141.82 square km and 13,825 people.

== History ==
- 1900: Founded as Ōshima Island Government Office.
- 1920: The island halls of Toshima, Niijima (including Shikinejima), Kōzushima, Miyakejima, and Mikurajima were abolished. The island government office takes control of these islands. The branch offices on Miyakejima and Niijima were founded.
- 1926: Changed to Ōshima Subprefecture.
- 1943: Miyakejima Branch Office was split as Miyake Subprefecture.
