= Mikurajima, Tokyo =

Mikurajima 御蔵島村
- Village
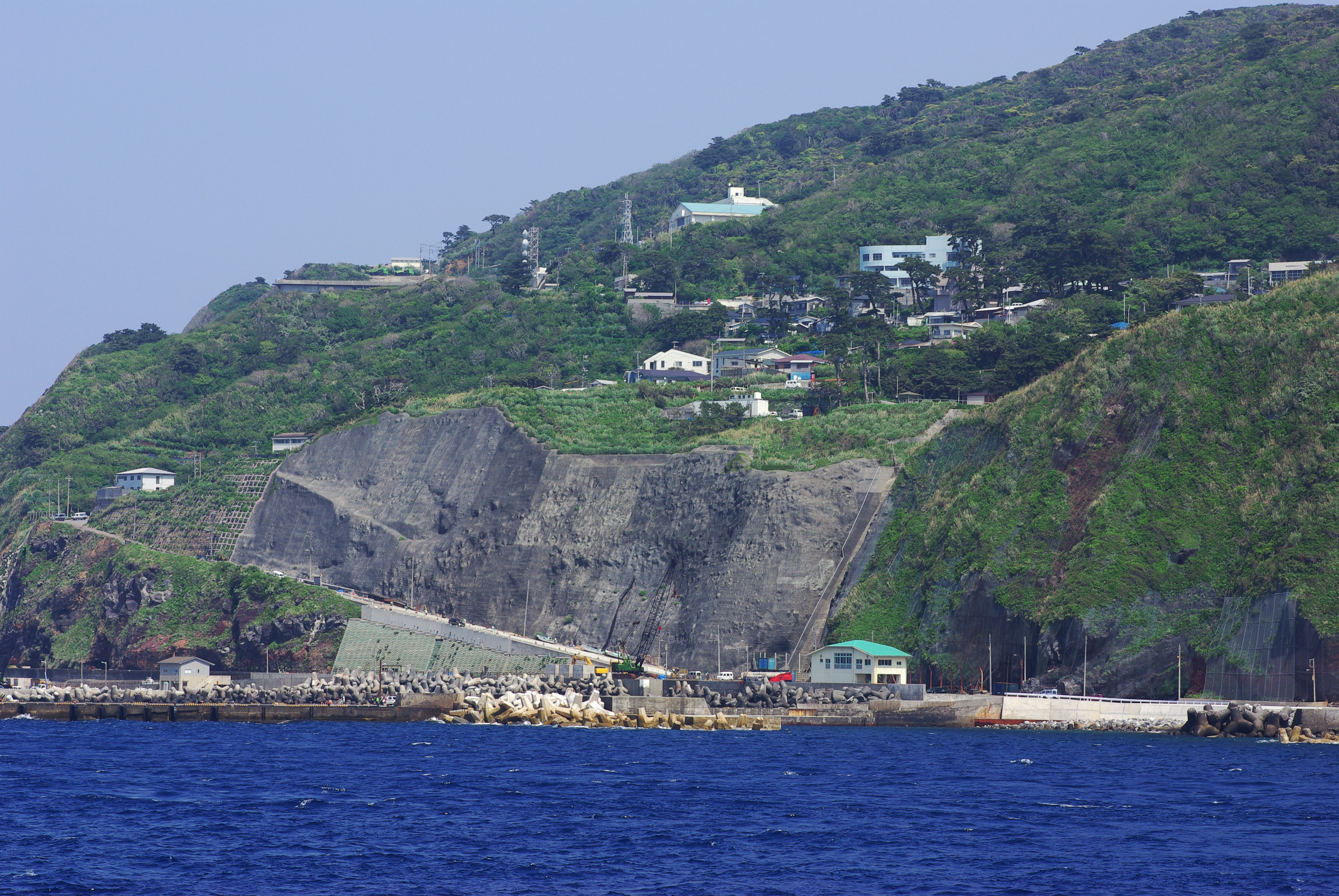
- Wharf at Mikurajima

- Flag Seal

- Location of Mikurajima in Tokyo Metropolis

- Coordinates: 33°53′50.4″N 139°35′45.8″E
- Country: Japan
- Region: Kantō
- Prefecture: Tokyo Metropolis

Area
  - Total: 27.54 km^{2} (10.63 sq mi)

Population (October 1, 2020)
  - Total: 323
  - Density: 11.7/km^{2} (30/sq mi)
- Time zone: UTC+9 (Japan Standard Time)
- Phone number: 04994-8-2121
- Address: Aza Irikanegasawa Mikurajima-mura, Tōkyō-to 100-1301
- Website: www.mikurasima.jp

Mikurajima Village (御蔵島村, Mikurajima-mura) is a village located in Miyake Subprefecture, Tokyo Metropolis, Japan. As of 1 October 2020, the village had an estimated population of 323, and a population density of 11.7 persons per km^{2}. Its total area is 20.54 square kilometres (7.93 sq mi).

== Geography ==
Mikurajima Village covers the inhabited island of Mikurajima, one of the northern islands in the Izu archipelago in the Philippine Sea, 200 kilometres (120 mi) south of Tokyo and 19 kilometres (12 mi) south-southeast of Miyakejima, and the uninhabited islet of Inambajima. Warmed by the Kuroshio Current, the village has a warmer and wetter climate than central Tokyo.

=== Neighboring municipalities ===
- Tokyo Metropolis
  - Niijima, Tokyo
  - Kōzushima, Tokyo

== Demographics ==
Per Japanese census data, the population of Mikurajima has remained relatively constant in recent decades.

Historical population
Year	Pop.	±%
1980	225	—
1990	293	+30.2%
2000	308	+5.1%
2010	348	+13.0%
2020	323	−7.2%

== History ==
Mikurajima Village was founded on October 1, 1923, when the Izu islands were administratively divided into villages and towns.

== Economy ==
The village economy is dominated by seasonal tourism supplemented by forestry and commercial fishing. There is also some small-scale farming. Tourists come for sports fishing and scuba diving. Due to its difficulty to access, it receives considerably fewer visitors than the other islands in the Izu chain. Due to the low population and limited number of visitors, the natural habitat remains relatively untainted. Electric power to the village is provided by a small hydroelectric power plant.

== Transportation ==
Mikurajima has no major harbor. Apart from the dolphin tours, access to the island is limited to the Tōkai Kisen ferry that sails from Miyakejima and helicopter to Hachijōjima, Izu Ōshima and Miyakejima.

== Education ==
The village operates a public elementary and junior high school, Mikurajima Elementary and Junior High School (御蔵島小中学校).

== See also ==
- Izu Islands
