= Izu Islands =

Island group in southeastern Japan

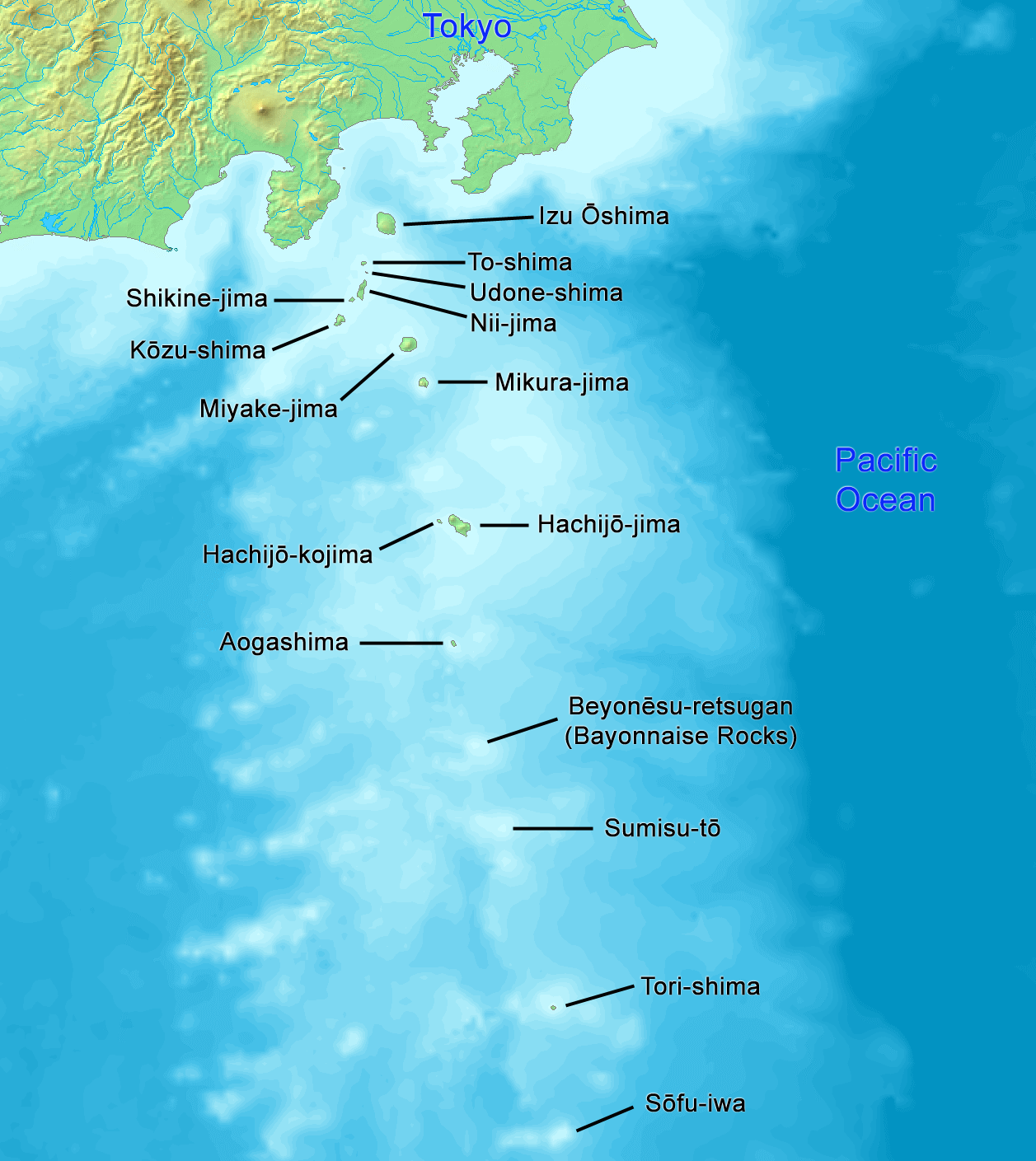
Map of the Izu Islands

The Izu Islands (伊豆諸島, Izu Shotō; Japanese pronunciation: [i.(d)zɯ, i.(d)zɯ ɕoꜜ.toː]) are a group of volcanic islands stretching south and east from the Izu Peninsula of Honshū, Japan. Administratively, they form two towns and six villages, all part of Tokyo Metropolis. The largest is Izu Ōshima, usually called simply Ōshima.

Although usually called the "Seven Islands of Izu" (伊豆七島 in Japanese), there are in fact more than a dozen islands and islets. Nine among them are currently inhabited.

== Geography ==
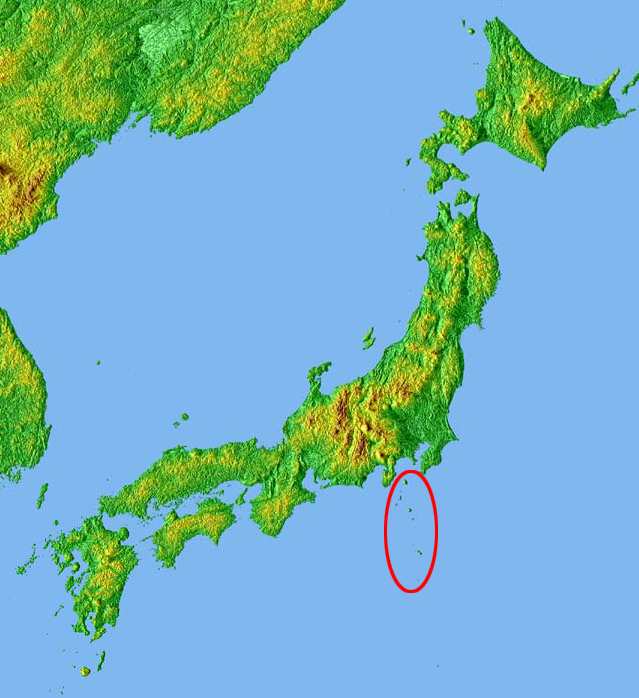
Location of the Izu Islands relative to Japan.

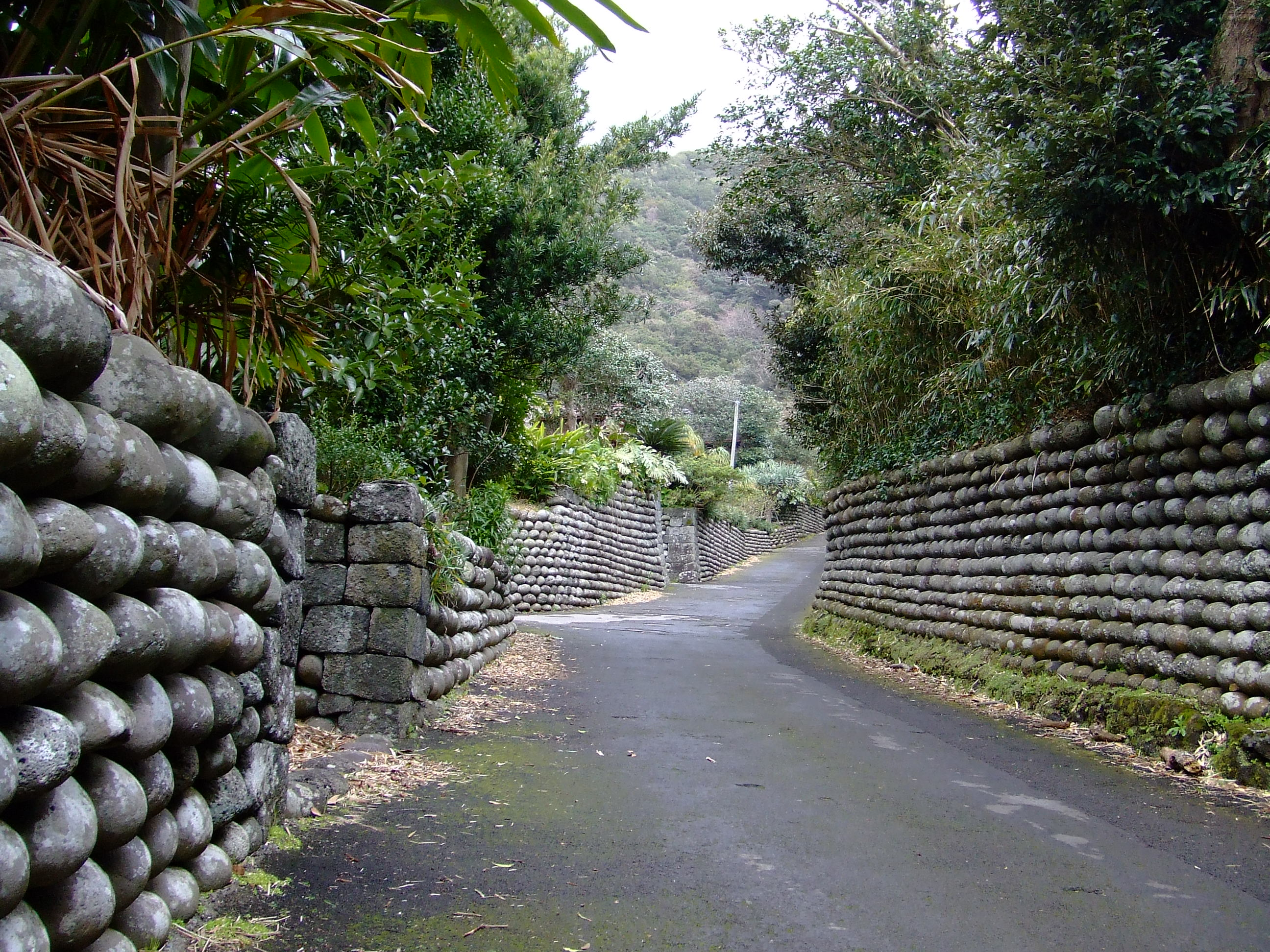
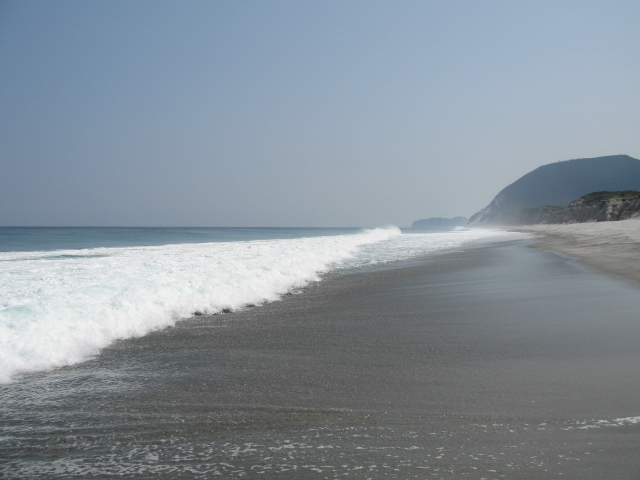
Left: Walls built by exiles on Hachijojima
Right: A beach on Niijima

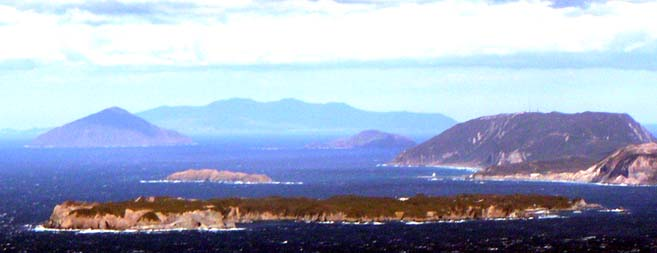
Shikinejima from Kōzushima. Furthest: Ōshima; left: Toshima; right: Niijima; smallest: Jinai-tō.

The Izu islands stretch south-east from the Izu Peninsula on Honshu and cover an area of approximately 301.56 km^{2} (116.43 sq mi). There are nine populated islands with a total population of 24,645 people (as of 2009) spread over 296.56 km^{2} (114.50 sq mi). The largest of them is Izu Oshima (8,346 inhabitants, 91.06 km^{2} (35.16 sq mi)), the smallest Toshima (292 inhabitants, 4.12 km^{2} (1.59 sq mi)). Of the inhabited islands, seven are traditionally referred to as the "Izu Seven": Oshima, Toshima, Niijima, Kozushima, Miyakejima, Hachijojima, and Mikurajima, though Shikinejima and Aogashima are sometimes included as well.

During the Edo period, Nii-jima, Miyake-jima, and Hachijō-jima served as places of exile for criminals.

The subtropical Ogasawara Islands, which are also administratively part of Tokyo, lie further to the south. They form a far-flung archipelago of over thirty (30) islands some 1,000 km (621 mi) due south of Tokyo.

=== Islands ===
Image	Name Kanji	Area km^{2}	Pop. 2007	Peak m	Peak Name	Coordinates
	Izu Ōshima 伊豆大島	91.06	8472	764	Mihara	34°44′N 139°24′E
	To-shima 利島	4.12	304	508	Miyatsuka	34°31′N 139°17′E
	Udone-shima 鵜渡根島	0.4	(Note: Udone-shima was inhabited during the Meiji era.)	210		34°28′21″N 139°17′38″E
	Nii-jima (with Hanshima and Jinai-tō) 新島	23.87	2420	432	Miyatsuka	34°22′N 139°16′E
	Shikine-jima 式根島	3.9	600	109	Kambiki	34°19.5′N 139°13′E
	Kōzu-shima 神津島	18.48	1914	572	Tenjō-zan	34°13′N 139°9′E
	Miyake-jima 三宅島	55.44	2382	815	Oyama	34°5′N 139°32′E
	Ōnohara-jima 大野原島	0.2	-	114	Koyasu	34°02′53″N 139°23′02″E
	Mikura-jima 御蔵島	20.58	313	851	Oyama	33°52.5′N 139°36′E
	Inamba-jima 藺灘波島	0.005	-	74		33°38′53″N 139°18′08″E
Hachijo Subprefecture
	Hachijō-jima 八丈島	62.52	8363	854	Nishiyama (Hachijō-Fuji)	33°7′N 139°47′E
	Hachijō-kojima 八丈小島	3.08	(Note: Uninhabited since 1969 (then population 31, with a peak of 513))	616.8	Taihei-zan	33°7′31″N 139°41′18″E
	Aogashima 青ヶ島	8.75	192	423	Maruyama (Ō-Toppu)	32°27′29″N 139°46′04″E
	Bayonnaise Rocks --- Myōjin-shō ベヨネース列岩	0.01	-	9.9		31°53′14″N 139°55′03″E
	Sumisu-tō 須美寿島	0.03	-	136		31°26′13″N 140°02′49″E
	Tori-shima 鳥島	4.79	(Note: Tori-shima, the largest of the uninhabited islands, had a population of 150 until 1902, when all were killed by a volcanic eruption. Since then, the island has been uninhabited.)	394	Iō-zan	30°28′48″N 140°18′22″E
	Sōfu-iwa 孀婦岩	0.0037	-	99		29°47′39″N 140°20′31″E

== Administrative divisions ==
The Izu Islands are divided into two towns (Oshima and Hachijojima) and six villages (the remaining inhabited islands.) Three subprefectures are formed above the municipalities as branch offices of the metropolitan government.

All the islands (more than a dozen in total) lie within the Fuji-Hakone-Izu National Park. The four southernmost islands are not administered under any town or village in Hachijō Subprefecture, but are unincorporated areas. Torishima is now uninhabited but is an important bird refuge.

Deserted islands between Aogashima and Ogasawara Islands, namely Bayonaise Rocks (Beyonēzu Retsugan), Smith Island (Sumisu-tō), Torishima, and Lot's Wife (Sōfu-iwa) do not belong to any municipality, because both Hachijō Town and Aogashima Village claim administrative rights. They are directly controlled by Hachijō Subprefecture instead.

- Ōshima Subprefecture
  - Ōshima Town: Izu Ōshima
  - Toshima Village: Toshima
  - Niijima Village: Niijima, Shikinejima, and Udoneshima
  - Kōzushima Village: Kōzushima
- Miyake Subprefecture
  - Miyake Village: Miyakejima and Ōnoharajima
  - Mikurajima Village: Mikurajima, Inambajima
- Hachijō Subprefecture
  - Hachijō Town: Hachijōjima and Hachijōkojima
  - Aogashima Village: Aogashima
  - Other: Bayonnaise Rocks (Beyonēzu Retsugan), Sumisu-tō, Torishima, and Sōfu-iwa

== Demographics ==
Though the population on the Izu Islands has been dropping, the pace is less dramatic than on other isolated Japanese islands.

Population changes
Year	Izu Islands	Isolated Japanese islands	Japan Total
1960	38,707	923,062	94,301,623
1970	32,539	736,712	104,665,171
1980	31,902	630,536	117,060,396
1990	30,032	546,505	123,611,167
2000	28,756	472,312	126,925,843
2005	26,242	422,712	127,767,994

The divergent Hachijō language is spoken on the islands.

== Infrastructure ==
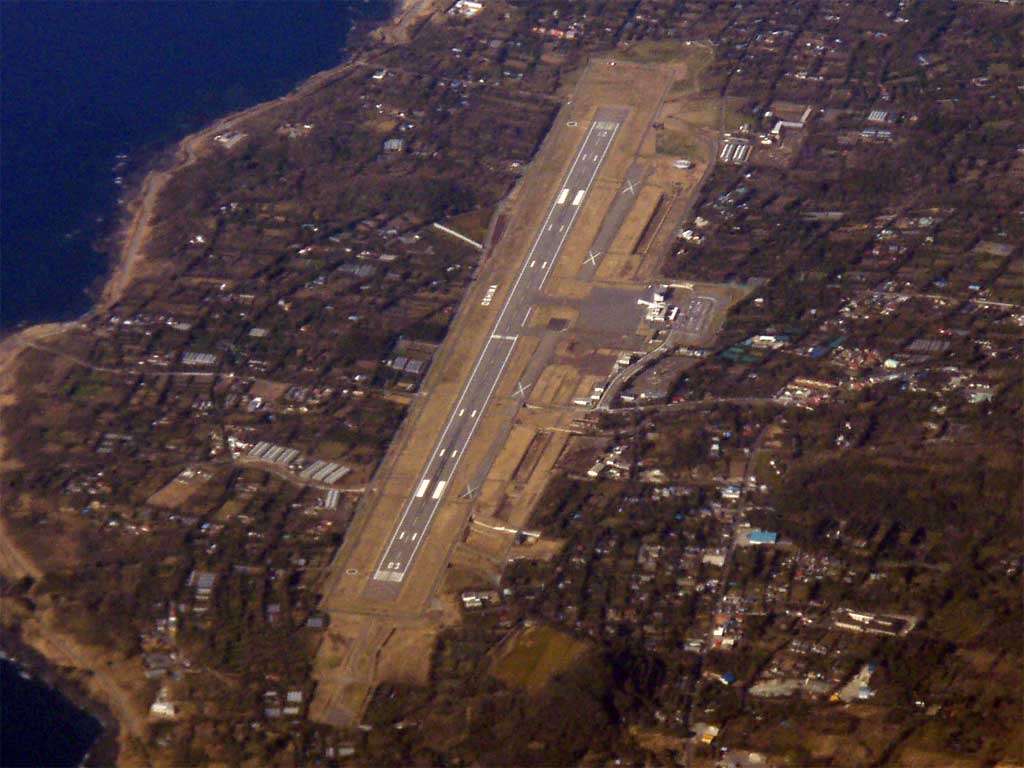
Oshima Airport.

The primary industries are fisheries, agriculture, and tourism. The most scenic spots on the islands are crowded with tourists during summers. Popular tourist activities include swimming, scuba diving, surfing, fishing, bird watching and trekking.

Transportation between the islands, by cargo-passengers boats, jetfoils, and aircraft, is supported by harbours on all inhabited islands and five airports (small islands can be reached by helicopter).

There are 5 airports, 15 harbors, and 19 fishing ports. Flights from Tokyo take 30 minutes, while boats take 7–10 hours and jetfoils make the route in about two hours. Transportation on the islands is considered important to the quality of life, which is why about 215 km (134 mi) of paved main roads have been constructed to serve various kinds of vehicles.

There was no electricity on the islands before 1953, but by 1962 98% of the area was receiving electricity.

== Geology ==
The islands occupy the northern portion of the Izu–Bonin–Mariana Arc which extends to the Izu Peninsula and Mount Fuji on the Honshū mainland which are northern extensions of the Izu volcanic arc. The Izu arc ends there at a tectonic triple junction.

Volcanic activity is frequent in the area. 31 people were killed when the research vessel Kaiyō Maru no 5 was destroyed during the 1953 eruption of Myōjin-shō. Volcanic activity, including the release of harmful gases, forced the evacuation of Miyake-jima in 2000. Residents were allowed to return permanently to the island in February 2005 but were required to carry gas masks in case of future volcanic emissions.

To handle the various types of natural disasters threatening the region, including tsunamis, storm, floods, and volcanism, Tokyo metropolitan government has developed prevention and safety measures, including hazard maps and evacuation guidance, radios, signs, and a transport system for emergency supplies.

== Ecology ==
A chain of volcanic islands, the Izu Archipelago are oceanic islands that formed relatively recently (within a few million years) without any previous connection to mainland Japan. In contrast to isolated Pacific islands, such as Hawaii and the Galápagos, the Izu Islands are located near the mainland and have thus been frequently colonized by various species by overseas dispersal from the mainland or from adjacent islands. This make them interesting for the studies of ecological and evolutionary processes.

Campanula (Bellflower) colonized the entire archipelago in a single event. Similarly, the Euhadra snails, endemic to Japan, populated the islands in a single event and all individuals on inhabited islands possess an identical haplotype. The Apodemus mice, on the other hand, colonized the islands from the mainland in two independent events.

== History ==
- 680 - Izu Province was established in the form of being separated from Suruga Province. At that time, the Izu islands belonged to Kamo-gun.
- 12th century and possibly earlier – used as Japanese convict settlements.
- 1643 - Explorer Maarten Gerritsz Vries called it the De Vries Archipelago.
- November 14, 1871 (December 25, 1871) --- Due to the first prefectural integration, they came under the jurisdiction of the Ashigara Prefecture.
- 1876 (Meiji 9), April 18 - Due to the second prefectural integration, they came under the jurisdiction of Shizuoka Prefecture.
- 1878 (Meiji 11), January 11 - they came under the jurisdiction of Tokyo Prefecture.

== See also ==
- List of islands of Japan
