= To-shima, Tokyo =

Village in Japan

Toshima 利島村
- Village
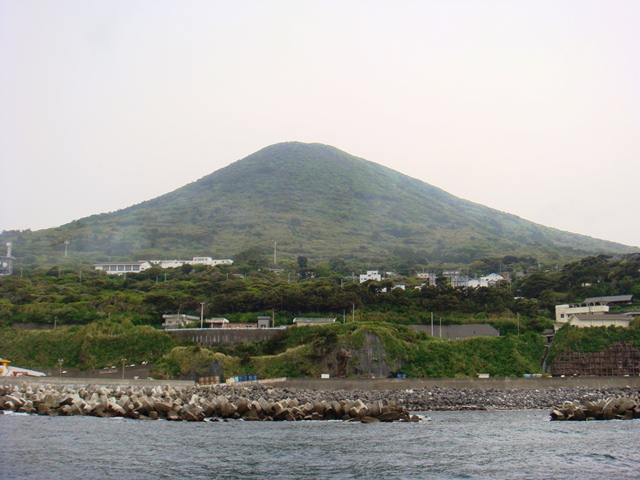

- Flag Seal

- Location of Toshima in Tokyo Metropolis

- Location in Japan
- Coordinates: 34°31′17″N 139°16′48″E
- Country: Japan
- Region: Kantō
- Prefecture: Tokyo Metropolis

Government
  - Mayor: Kazuhisa Umeda

Area
  - Total: 4.12 km^{2} (1.59 sq mi)

Population (October 1 2020)
  - Total: 327
  - Density: 79.4/km^{2} (206/sq mi)
- Time zone: UTC+09:00 (JST)
- City hall address: 248, Toshima-mura, Tōkyō-to; 100-0301
- Website: www.toshimamura.org

Toshima (利島村, Toshima-mura; Japanese pronunciation: [tó̞.ɕì.mä̀, tò̞.ɕí.mä́]) is a village located in Ōshima Subprefecture, Tokyo Metropolis, Japan. The village comprises the whole of Toshima Island.

The island, at 4.12 square kilometres (1.59 square miles), is one of the smallest inhabited islands in the Izu Island chain. Approximately 330 people live on the island. Eighty per cent of the island is covered by camellia forests. From November to March, much of the island is red from the camellia flowers. The island is also home to the Saku lily (Lilium auratum var. platyphyllum), the largest lily in the world.

The island is between Izu Ōshima, the largest of the Izu Islands, and Nii-jima. Ferries that sail to Nii-jima make a brief stop at Toshima. Toshima is also accessible (weather permitting) by helicopter departing from Ōshima island, from Ōshima airport it is a 10-minute flight to Toshima.

The main industry on Toshima is fishing. There is some small-scale farming and tourism.

== Geography ==
To-shima (利島), a volcanic island in the Izu Islands, is administered by the Tōkyō Metropolitan government. It lies south of Tōkyō and east of the Izu Peninsula, Shizuoka Prefecture. Toshima forms part of the Fuji-Hakone-Izu National Park. The island has been recognised as an Important Bird Area (IBA) by BirdLife International because it supports populations of Japanese wood pigeons, Pleske's grasshopper warblers, Ijima's leaf-warblers and Izu thrushes.

== Demographics ==
Per Japanese census data, the population of Toshima has remained relatively steady in recent decades.

Historical population
Year	Pop.	±%
1980	278	—
1990	315	+13.3%
2000	302	−4.1%
2010	341	+12.9%
2020	327	−4.1%

== Education ==
There is a single combined elementary and junior high school, Toshima Elementary and Junior High School (利島村立利島小中学校).

For high school students may attend schools on other islands operated by the Tokyo Metropolitan Board of Education.

== Gallery ==
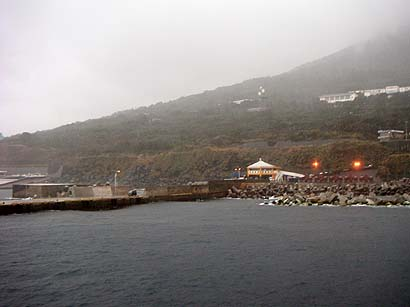
Toshima Port

== See also ==
- List of islands of Japan
