= Subprefectures of Japan =

Administrative divisions

Subprefectures of Japan (支庁, shichō) are a Japanese form of self-government which focuses on local issues below the prefectural level. It acts as part of the greater administration of the state and as part of a self-government system.

== History ==
They were given a definite form in 1878 (Meiji 11).

The Meiji government established the sub-prefecture (郡, -gun) as an administrative unit.

In 1888 (Meiji 21), the sub-prefecture as a form of self-government was officially recognized as more general than civic corporations like cities, towns and villages.

Certain prefectures of Japan are now, or once were, divided into subprefectures. The subprefecture is the jurisdiction surrounding a "branch office" of the prefectural government. Normally, the area of a subprefecture consists of a few to a dozen cities, towns, and/or villages. Subprefectures are formed to provide services of the prefectural government in geographically remote areas. They are usually not used in postal addresses.

== Existing subprefectures ==
- Hokkaidō, the largest prefecture by area in Japan, was divided into fourteen subprefectures. These were formed in 1897. The subprefectures did not include major cities, such as Sapporo and Hakodate, until 1922. In 2010 they were replaced by 9 General Subprefectural Bureaus and 5 Subprefectural Bureaus. See: Subprefectures in Hokkaidō
- Kagoshima has two subprefectures, Ōshima and Kumage, located in Amami and Nishinoomote respectively. They cover the islands between Kagoshima and Okinawa.
- Miyazaki contains a single subprefecture, Nishiusuki, a remote mountain district in the northwest corner of the prefecture.
- Tokyo contains four subprefectures that provide administrative services to residents of outlying islands under the Tokyo Metropolitan Government. The four branch offices are located at Hachijō, Miyake, Ogasawara and Ōshima.
- Shimane contains one subprefecture governing the Oki Islands. This is the closest Japanese government office to Liancourt Rocks, a small island group held by South Korea but claimed by Japan.
- Yamagata is divided into four subprefectures, each of which is located in one of the four main urban areas of the prefecture (Yamagata, Shinjo, Yonezawa and Shonai plains).

== Historical subprefectures ==
- Hyōgo, another geographically large prefecture, was divided into ten subprefectures, but these are now known as citizen's bureaus (県民局, kenmin-kyoku).
- Chiba was divided into five subprefectures until 2003, when the branch offices were renamed citizens' centers (県民センター, kenmin-sentā).
- Nagasaki had three subprefectures that provide services to the outlying islands of Tsushima, Iki and Gotō. They were replaced by Regional Offices and then by District Offices.
- Okinawa had two subprefectures, Miyako and Yaeyama, located on the islands of Miyakojima and Ishigaki respectively. These offices provided prefectural government services to the isolated archipelagos surrounding both islands. They were abolished in March 2009 and duties taken over by the governments of Miyakojima City, Miyako District, Ishigaki City, and Yaeyama District.

In addition, in 1907 Japan formed Karafuto Prefecture to govern the island of Sakhalin. Karafuto was divided into four subprefectures: Toyohara (in present-day Yuzhno-Sakhalinsk), Maoka (in present-day Kholmsk), Esutoru (in present-day Uglegorsk) and Shikuka (in present-day Makarov).

A number of islands gained by Japan in the Treaty of Versailles were placed under the direction of a South Pacific Prefecture (南洋庁, Nan'yōchō) from 1922 to 1945. This was divided into six subprefectures, on the islands of Saipan, Yap, Palau, Truk, Pohnpei and Jaluit. In November 1943, the six subprefectures were merged into "eastern", "western" and "northern" subprefectures, which remained in place until the Surrender of Japan in 1945.

=== Taiwan ===
Taiwan during Japanese rule initially had its prefectures – ken (県), later termed shū (州) and chō (庁) – subdivided into shichō. Most of the later subprefectures were named gun (郡; also "districts"). Some English texts translate "sub-prefecture" differently, using it instead for the chō of Taiwan, which were remote prefectures that were much less populated, once considered "sub-", or "lesser", prefectures, i.e., Hōko (the Pescadores), Karenkō (Hualien) and Taitō (Taitung). The offshore Hōko was home to the last two remaining subprefectures named shichō: Makō (馬公支廳) and Mōan (望安支廳).

== See also ==
- Administrative division
- Urban area
- Subprefecture
