= List of islands of Japan =

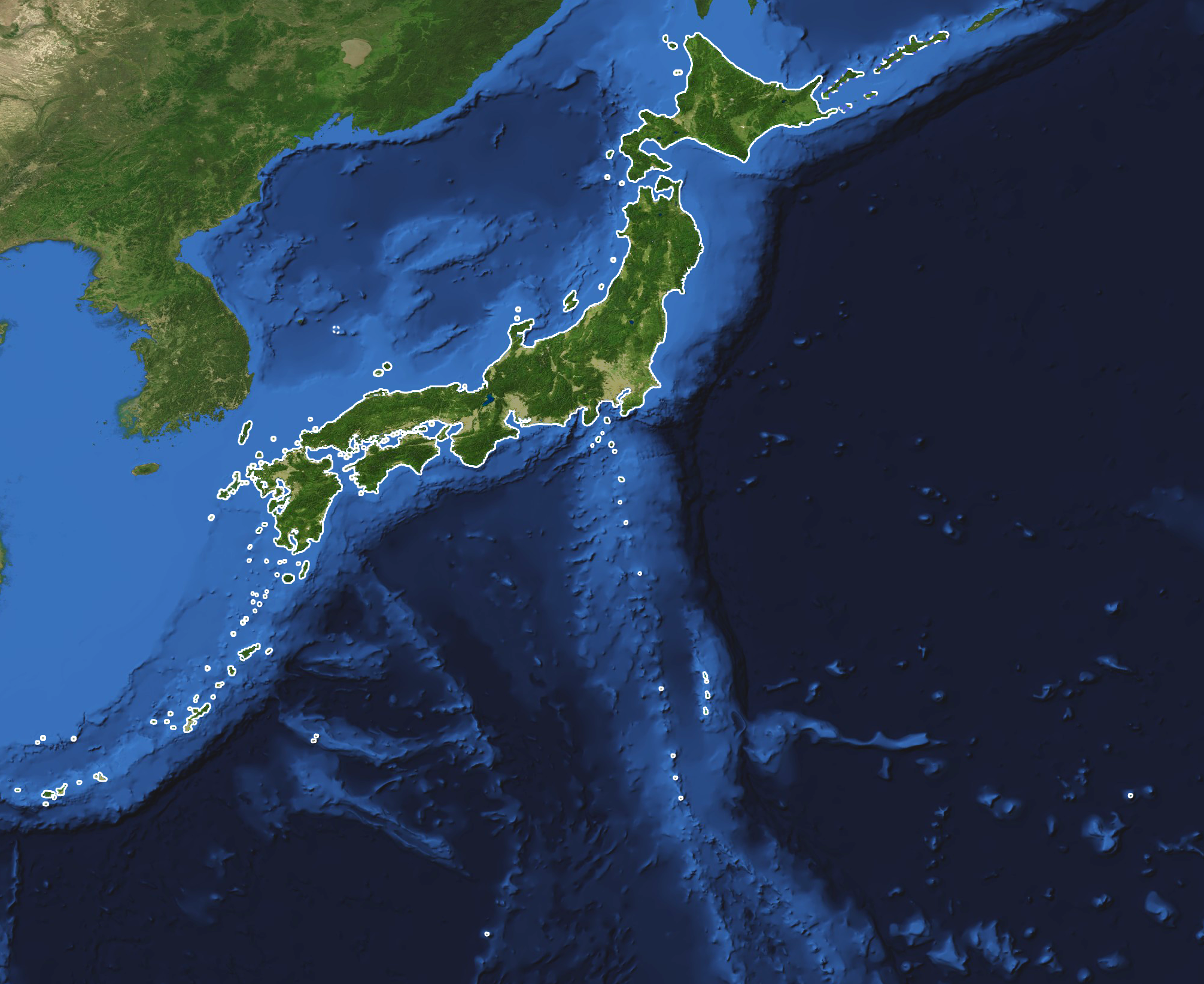
Japanese islands outlined

Japan is an island country of 14,125 islands, of which approximately 260 are inhabited. Japan is the third-largest island country in the world, behind Indonesia and Madagascar. Japan is also the second-most-populous island country in the world, behind only Indonesia.

According to a survey conducted by the Japan Coast Guard in 1987, the number of islands in Japan was 6,852. At that time, the survey only counted islands with coastlines of 100 meters or more that were shown on paper maps. On February 28, 2023, the Geospatial Information Authority of Japan announced that the number of islands had been updated to 14,125 through a recount using digital maps. Since there is no international standard for counting islands, only islands with a coastline of 100 meters or more were counted, as in the past. According to the GSI, advances in surveying technology and the detailed representation of topographic features through digital mapping contributed to this announcement.

== Japanese archipelago ==
=== Main islands ===
The main islands of Japan

The four main islands of Japan are:

- Hokkaido – the northernmost and second-largest main island, third most populous.
- Honshu – the largest island, with the capital Tokyo and over 80% of the population. Honshu is connected to the other three main islands by bridges and tunnels.
- Kyushu – the third-largest main island, second most populous and the nearest to the Asian mainland.
- Shikoku – the smallest and least populous main island, located between Honshu and Kyushu.

=== Islands around Hokkaido ===
- Ōshima
- Okushiri Island
- Teuri Island
- Rebun Island
- Rishiri Island
- Yagishiri Island
- Kamome island

=== Islands of Honshu in the Sea of Japan ===
- Awashima Island, Niigata
- Kanmurijima
- Kutsujima, Kyoto
- Mitsukejima
- Nanatsujima archipelago
- Notojima
- Oki Islands
  - Dōgo
  - Nakanoshima
  - Nishinoshima
  - Chiburijima
- Oomijima
- Sado
- Takashima, Shimane
- Tobishima (Yamagata)
  - Oshakujima
- Tsunoshima
- Umashima, Shimane

=== Islands in Tokyo Bay ===
- Dream Island (Yume No Shima)
- Odaiba (artificial island)
- Sarushima (natural)
- Jonan Island
- Heiwa Island
- Showa Island
- Keihin Island
- Tokyo International Airport (artificial island)
- Katsushima
- Hakkeijima
- Higashi Ogijima
- Wakasu
- Oogishima
- Ukishima

=== Islands in Osaka Bay ===
- Maishima
- Yumeshima
- Sakishima
- Kansai International Airport (artificial island)
- Kobe Airport (artificial island)
- Port Island
- Rokkō Island
- Minami Ashiyahama
- Wakayama Marina City
- Nishinomiyahama

=== Islands in Ise Bay ===
- Chūbu Centrair International Airport (artificial island)
- Kami-shima
- Kashiko Island
- Kozukumi Island
- Mikimoto Pearl Island

=== Islands in Mutsu Bay ===
- Ōshima
- Taijima

=== Nanpō Islands (Nanpō Shotō) ===
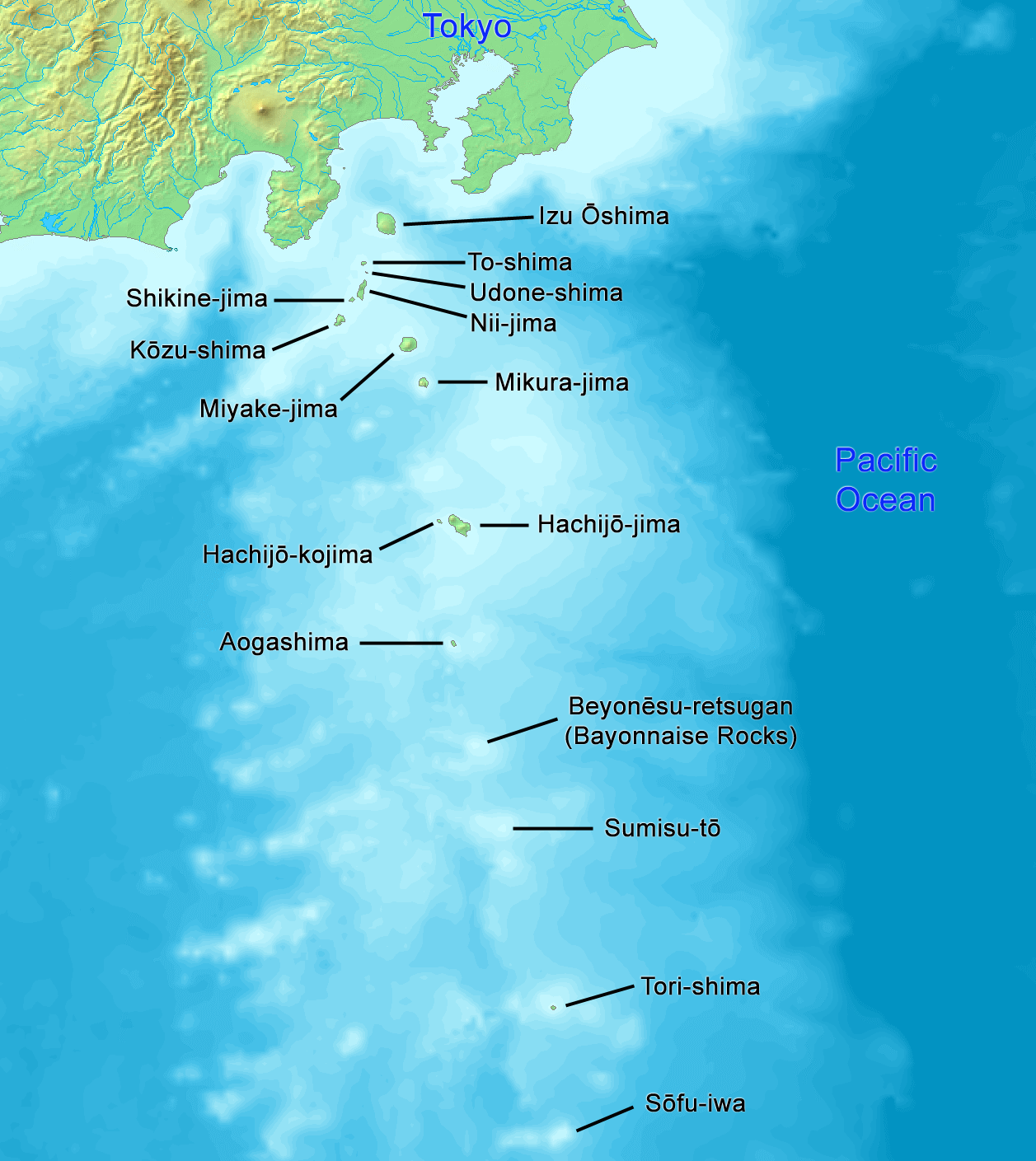
Izu Islands

- Izu Islands
  - Aogashima
  - Hachijō
  - Izu Ōshima
  - Kōzu
  - Miyake-jima
  - Mikura-jima
  - Nii-jima
  - Shikine
  - Toshima
  - Tori-shima
  - Udonejima
- Ogasawara Islands (Bonin Islands)
  - Mukojima Rettō
  - Chichijima
  - Hahajima
  - Mukojima
- Volcano Islands (Kazan Rettō)
  - Nishinoshima
  - Kita Iwo Jima (North Iwo Jima)
  - Iwo Jima
  - Minami Iwo Jima (South Iwo Jima)

=== Other Japanese islands ===
- Minami Torishima (Marcus Island)
- Enoshima
- Okino Torishima (Parece Vela)

=== Islands around Kyushu ===
Most of these are located in the East China Sea.

- Amakusa Islands
  - Shimoshima Island, Amakusa
  - Kamishima Island, Amakusa
- Nagashima Island, Kagoshima
- Aoshima
- Gotō Islands
- Danjo Islands
- Hizentorishima
- Hashima
- Hirado
- Iki
- Koshikijima Islands
  - Shimokoshiki-jima
  - Kamikoshiki-jima
- Tsushima
- Ukushima

=== Islands around Shikoku ===
- Kuro-shima (Ehime)
- Nii Ōshima

=== Ryukyu Islands (Nansei-shotō) ===
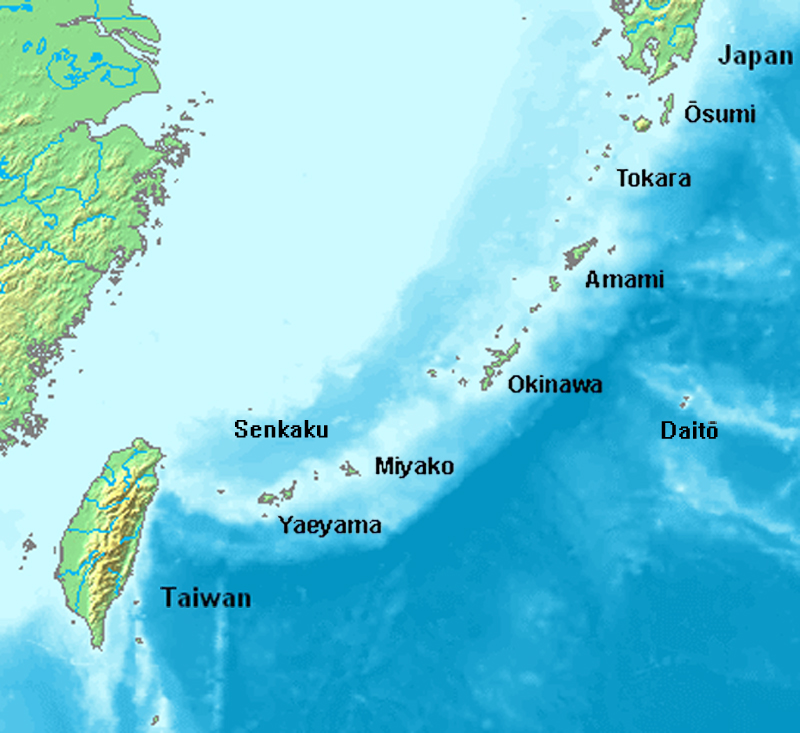
Ryukyu Islands

==== Satsunan Islands ====
The northern half is administratively part of Kagoshima Prefecture of the Kyushu Region.

===== Ōsumi Islands =====
The North-Eastern Group:

- Tanegashima
- Yakushima
- Kuchinoerabujima
- Mageshima

The North-Western Group:

- Iōjima
- Shōwa Iōjima
- Kuroshima
- Takeshima

===== Tokara Islands =====
- Kuchinoshima
- Nakanoshima (Kagoshima)
- Gajajima
- Suwanosejima
- Akusekijima
- Tairajima
- Kodakarajima
- Takarajima

===== Amami Islands =====
- Amami Ōshima
- Kikaijima
- Kakeromajima
- Yoroshima
- Ukeshima
- Tokunoshima
- Okinoerabujima
- Yoronjima

==== Ryukyu Islands (Ryūkyū-shotō) ====
The southern half is administratively part of Okinawa Prefecture.

===== Okinawa Islands =====
The Central Group or Ryukyu proper:

- Okinawa Island
- Kumejima
- Iheyajima
- Izenajima
- Agunijima
- Iejima
- Iōtorishima
- Kerama Islands
  - Tokashikijima
  - Zamamijima
  - Akajima
  - Gerumajima
- Daitō Islands
  - Kitadaitojima
  - Minamidaitōjima
  - Okidaitōjima

===== Sakishima Islands =====
Also known as the Further Isles:

- Miyako Islands
  - Miyako-jima
  - Ikema
  - Ogami
  - Irabu Island
  - Shimoji
  - Kurima-jima
  - Minna
  - Tarama
- Yaeyama Islands
  - Iriomote
  - Ishigaki
  - Taketomi
  - Kohama
  - Kuroshima
  - Aragusuku
  - Hatoma
  - Yubujima
  - Hateruma
  - Yonaguni
- Senkaku Islands - controlled by Japan, disputed by China and Taiwan.
  - Uotsurijima
  - Kuba Jima
  - Taisho Jima
  - Kita Kojima
  - Minami Kojima

=== Seto Inland Sea islands ===
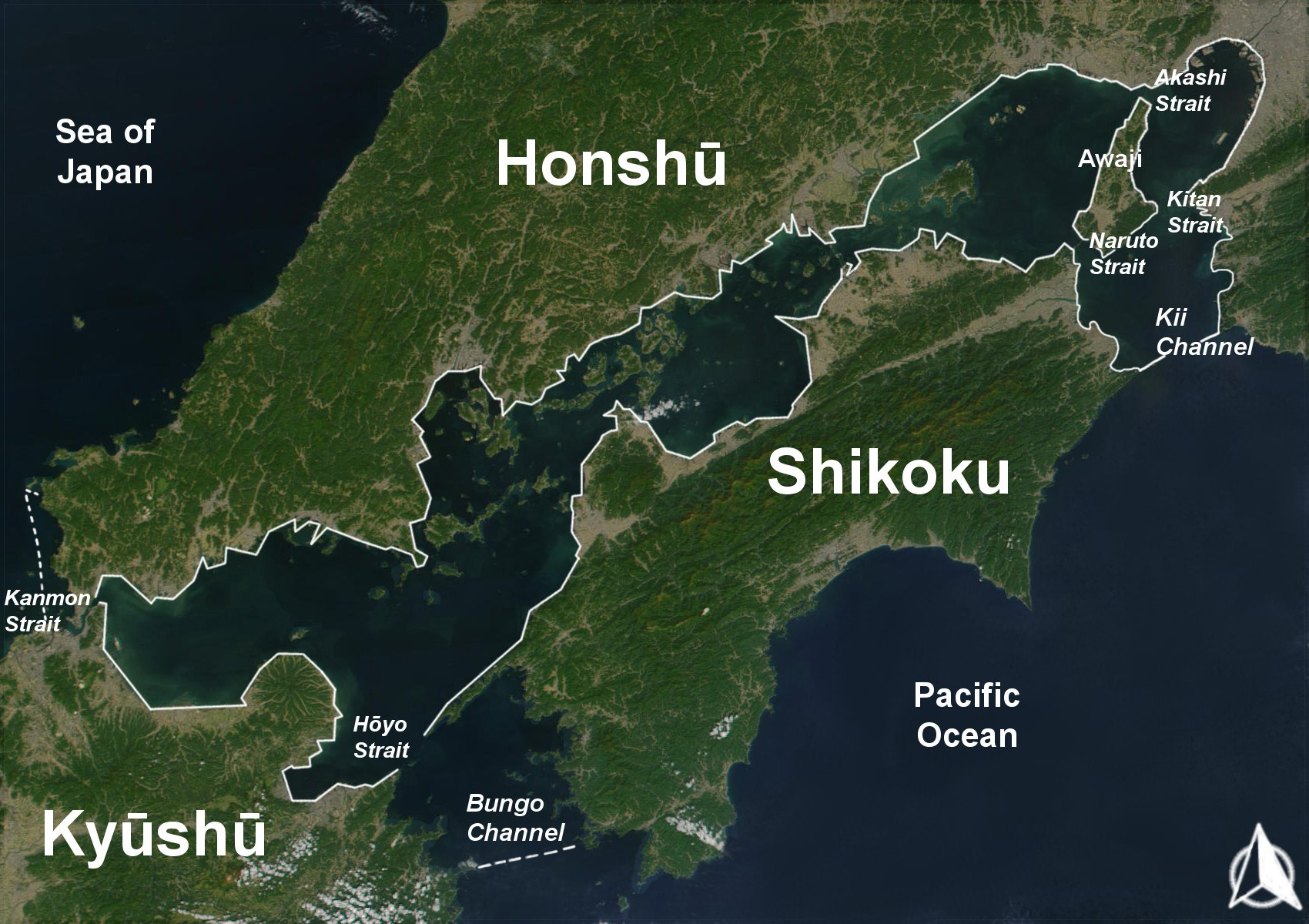
Seto Inland Sea

- Kasaoka Islands
  - Takashima Island (Okayama) 高島 (岡山県笠岡市)
  - Shiraishi Island
  - Kitagi Island, 北木島
  - Obishi Island, 大飛島
  - Kobi Island, 小飛島
  - Manabeshima, 真鍋島
  - Mushima Island (Okayama), 六島 (岡山県)
- Shiwaku Islands
- Awaji
- Etajima
- Kurahashi-jima
- Inujima
- Itsukushima (popularly known as "Miyajima")
- Shōdoshima
- Naoshima Islands
- Suō-Ōshima, Yamaguchi
- Himeshima, Ōita
- Aoshima, Ehime
- Hashira Island
- Okamura Island
- Ōshima (Ehime)
- Mukaishima Island, Hiroshima
- Ōmishima Island, Ehime
- Ōkunoshima (often called "Rabbit Island")

=== Islands in lakes ===
- Daikon-island
- Bentenjima in Lake Tōya
- Bentenjima in Lake Hamana

=== Other artificial islands ===
- Chūbu Centrair International Airport
- Dejima
- New Kitakyushu Airport
- Midori No Shima, off Hakodate (artificial)
- Malimpia Okinosu (artificial)
- Wakaejima (artificial)
- Island City, Fukuoka (artificial)

=== Claims but does not control ===
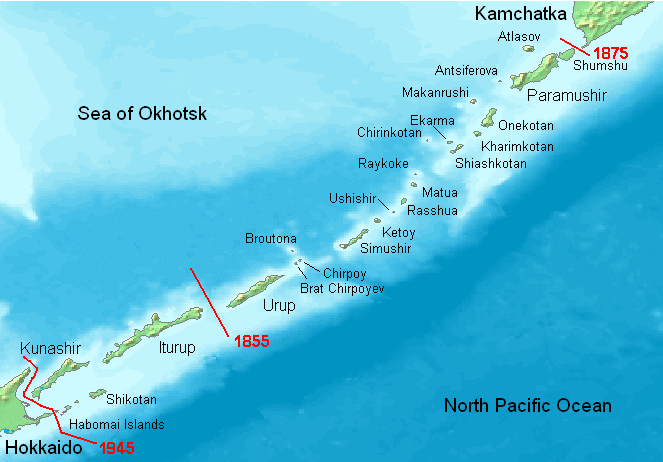
Kuril islands and the Northern Territories

==== The Northern Territories ====
There are four disputed Kuril Islands that are controlled by Russia and claimed by Japan. These islands are called the Chishima Islands.

- Iturup - Etorofu (択捉島, Etorofu-tō)
- Kunashir - Kunashiri (国後島, Kunashiri-tō)
- Shikotan - Shikotan (色丹島, Shikotan-tō)
- Habomai Islands - Habomai (歯舞群島, Habomai-guntō)

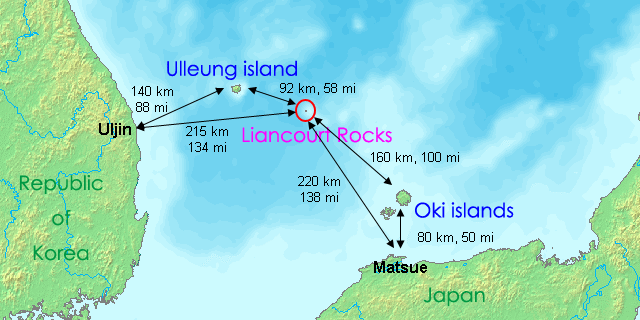
Liancourt rocks between Japan and Korea

==== Others ====
- Liancourt Rocks (Dokdo/Takeshima) - controlled by South Korea, disputed by Japan. North Korea also claims the island, and has criticized Japan over its claim.

=== Former ===
- South Seas Mandate (1919–1947) - administered by the Empire of Japan as a League of Nations mandate until its defeat in 1945. In 1947, the region was placed under the United Nations trusteeship system as the Trust Territory of the Pacific Islands, administered by the U.S.. The Commonwealth of the Northern Mariana Islands later became a U.S. territory, while Palau, the Marshall Islands, and the Federated States of Micronesia became sovereign independent nations.
- Taiwan and Penghu (1895–1952) - part of the Empire of Japan until its defeat in 1945. Taken over by the Republic of China in 1945 but no treaty of sovereignty transfer has been signed. All claims relinquished by Japan in the Treaty of San Francisco signed in 1951.
- Karafuto (1905–1949) - the southern half of the island of Sakhalin, controlled by Japan after the Russo-Japanese War. Japan lost control of Karafuto after its invasion by the Soviet Union during World War II. Formally abolished as a legal entity by Japan in 1949. Japan in addition controlled the northern half of Sakhalin between 1920 and 1925, during and after the Russian Civil War.
- Jeju Island (1910–1945) - part of Korea, annexed by Japanese colonial empire until its defeat in 1945.

== Largest islands of Japan ==
These are the 50 largest islands of Japan. It excludes the disputed Kuril islands known as the northern territories.

Rank	Island name	Area (km^{2})	Area (sq mi)	Island group
1	Honshu	227,960	88,020	
2	Hokkaido	83,424.31	32,210.31	
3	Kyushu	36,782	14,202	
4	Shikoku	18,800	7,300	
5	Okinawa Island	1,207	466	Okinawa Islands, Central Part of the Ryukyu Islands
6	Sado Island	855.26	330.22	
7	Amami Ōshima	712.35	275.04	Amami Islands, Northern Part of the Ryukyu Islands
8	Tsushima Island	708.7	273.6	
9	Awaji Island	592.17	228.64	Seto Inland Sea Islands
10	Shimoshima Island, Amakusa	574.01	221.63	Amakusa Islands
11	Yakushima	504.88	194.94	Ōsumi Islands, Northern Part of the Ryukyu Islands
12	Tanegashima	444.99	171.81	Ōsumi Islands, Northern Part of the Ryukyu Islands
13	Fukue Island	326.43	126.04	Gotō Islands
14	Iriomote Island	289.27	111.69	Yaeyama Islands, Southern Part of the Ryukyu Islands
15	Tokunoshima	247.8	95.7	Amami Islands, Northern Part of the Ryukyu Islands
16	Dōgojima	241.58	93.27	Oki Islands
17	Kamishima Island, Amakusa	225.32	87.00	Amakusa Islands
18	Ishigaki Island	222.5	85.9	Yaeyama Islands, Southern Part of the Ryukyu Islands
19	Rishiri Island	183	71	
20	Nakadōri Island	168.34	65.00	Gotō Islands
21	Hirado Island	163.42	63.10	
22	Miyako-jima	158.87	61.34	Miyako Islands, Southern Part of the Ryukyu Islands
23	Shōdoshima	153.30	59.19	Seto Inland Sea Islands
24	Okushiri Island	142.97	55.20	
25	Iki Island	138.46	53.46	
26	Suō-Ōshima	128.31	49.54	
27	Okinoerabujima	93.63	36.15	Amami Islands, Northern Part of the Ryukyu Islands
28	Etajima	91.32	35.26	
29	Izu Ōshima	91.06	35.16	Izu Islands
30	Nagashima Island, Kagoshima	90.62	34.99	
31	Rebun Island	80	31	
32	Kakeromajima	77.39	29.88	Amami Islands, Northern Part of the Ryukyu Islands
33	Kurahashi-jima	69.46	26.82	
34	Shimokoshiki-jima	66.12	25.53	
35	Ōmishima Island, Ehime	66.12	25.53	
36	Hachijō-jima	62.52	24.14	Izu Islands
37	Kume Island	59.11	22.82	Okinawa Islands, Central Part of the Ryukyu Islands
38	Kikaijima	56.93	21.98	Amami Islands, Northern Part of the Ryukyu Islands
39	Nishinoshima	55.98	21.61	
40	Miyake-jima	55.44	21.41	Izu Islands
41	Notojima	46.78	18.06	
42	Kamikoshiki-jima	45.08	17.41	
43	Ōshima (Ehime)	41.87	16.17	
44	Ōsakikamijima	38.27	14.78	
45	Kuchinoerabu-jima	38.04	14.69	
46	Hisaka	37.23	14.37	
47	Innoshima	35.03	13.53	
48	Nakanoshima (in Kagoshima)	34.47	13.31	Tokara Islands, Northern Part of the Ryukyu Islands
49	Hario Island	33.16	12.80	
50	Nakanoshima (in Shimane)	32.21	12.44	Oki Islands

== See also ==
- Geography of Japan
- Japanese archipelago
- List of islands of Japan by area
- Lists of islands
- Names of Japan
