= 2023 in archaeology =

This page lists significant events of 2023 in archaeology.

== Excavations ==
- 26 June–21 July – Excavations take place at Lowther Castle Stead in Cumbria, England. The project is led by Sophie Thérèse Ambler of the University of Lancaster.
- July–7 October – Excavations take place at Ard-al-Moharbeen necropolis in the Gaza Strip, Palestine led by Rene Elter.
- 19–21 July – Excavations take place at Sleaford Castle in Lincolnshire, England.
- 8–18 August – Excavation takes place at the King's Park, in Stirling, Scotland to investigate a Late Prehistoric fort identified in 2017.
- 14 August–8 September – Excavation takes place at the Burn of Swartigill, an Iron Age site in Caithness, Scotland.
- 2023–2024 – Excavation of a probable Jiangnan ship off the Japanese island of Takashima thought to be one of the fleet from the Second Mongol invasion of Japan (1281) sunk by the great kamikaze (typhoon) of that year.

== Finds ==
January

- 5 – A study reports that notational signs from ~37,000 years ago in caves, apparently conveying calendaric meaning about the behaviour of animal species drawn next to them, are the first known (proto-)writing in history.
- 17 – 4,500 year-old Sumerian Lord Palace of the Kings is discovered in Iraq, Girsu.
- 27 – 1,600-year-old fragment of Roman dodecahedron unearthed in Belgium, Flanders.

February

- 20 – A study reports that 2,000 year-old disembodied 6.3 inches long wooden phallus toy was revealed at the Roman Fort of Vindolanda by the Newcastle University.
- 21 – A 2,000-year-old stringed musical instrument about 35 centimeters long was discovered at the Go Ô Chùa archaeological site in Long An province, southern Vietnam.
- 22
  - The remains of two elite brothers were found in a Bronze Age tomb in Tel Megiddo, Israel. The early evidence of a Bronze Age cranial surgery called trepanation was also identified in one of the males.
  - A study reports the earliest evidence of bow and arrow use outside Africa – ~54,000 years ago in France, showing the earliest known H. sapiens to migrate into Neandertal territories used these technologies.
- 26 – 16 individual tombs and 6 funerary complex from the Persian, Roman and Coptic periods were discovered by the Egyptian-Spanish archaeological mission at the Al-Bahnasa archaeological site, Minya, Egypt.
- 28 – A study reports that steel chisels were already in use in Europe on the Iberian peninsula around 2,900 years ago.

March

- 1 – Ancient Egyptian hieroglyphs inscribed on sandstone blocks was discovered in Old Dongola, Sudan by Polish archaeologists.
- 4
  - A submerged prehistoric site with the remains of extinct species was discovered in the Quintero Bay on the central Chilean coast.
  - A treasure hoard weighing 3 kg was uncovered in a ceramic jar in Lublin Voivodeship, Poland.
- 6 – A Roman era sphinx was revealed at the lower level of the Dendera Temple complex in Qena, Egypt.
- 7 – A 1,800 year-old Roman era stone altar was discovered in the grounds of Leicester Cathedral by the University of Leicester, England.
- 9
  - Evidence of the Romano-Celtic religious temple was discovered near the Lancaster Fort during a hydrogeophysics training session in Lancaster, England.
  - A cemetery dated to the Tang Dynasty with over 300 artifacts was unearthed in Datong, China.
  - Pre-Columbian temple complex made of dried bricks with destroyed human burials was discovered near Barranca, Peru.
- 10 – The remains of the Roman amphitheater were discovered at the Roman city of Ategua, Cordoba, Spain.
- 13 – The remains of the watermill structure with an associated building that contained two rooms were identified at a small site near Buckingham, England.
- 14
  - A collection of medieval artifacts including a clasp and two denarii, the crosses, rings made of copper wire, silver ornaments from the 11th-12th century AD was discovered in Daromin, Poland.
  - 3 Mycenaean bronze swords dating to the 12th century BC were revealed in the Greek tomb on the Trapeza Plateau in the Peloponnese, Greece.
- 17 – Roman era mosaic made of red, blue and white tiles was discovered by Oxford Archaeology team in Olney, Buckinghamshire.
- 18
  - An ancient circular shape ring ditch was uncovered in Derbyshire, England.
  - A serpent sculpture which served to guide the route from the El Templo was discovered at Chichen Itza, Yucatán, Mexico.
  - Adobe walls with 1,400 year-old ancient murals depicting double-faced figurines were discovered at Pañamarca, Peru.
- 20
  - Celestial reliefs depicting the heavens with the signs of zodiac were discovered during re-coloring works in the Temple of Esna, Egypt.
  - Maya burial chamber with offerings and skeletal remains was discovered in Palenque, Chiapas, Mexico.
  - More remains of the Matriya Sun Temple with a number of quartzite stone from the time of Horemheb was uncovered in Heliopolis, Egypt.
  - Byzantine period mosaic with a series of floral patterns was revealed by the Israel Antiquities Authority in Shoham, Israel.
- 21 – The remains of a mosaic flooring with geometric pattern below the AD 79 floor level of the corridor was revealed in Pompeii, Naples, Italy.
- 25 – 2,000 Ptolemaic era Ram (male sheep) heads with other votive offerings were uncovered at Temple of Ramesses II in Abydos by the University of York archaeologists.
- 27 – 1,800-year-old Roman era artifacts including statuettes of the goddess Venus, a potter's kiln, coins and clothing pins were discovered by archaeologists in Rennes, northwest France.
- 30 – 2,500 year-old Bronze Age treasure with an axe head, two bronze hoop ornaments and jewelry was discovered near Zalewo, Poland.
- 31 – A 1,000-year-old square-shaped brick tomb containing three people from the Jurchen Jin dynasty has been found in Shanxi province, China.
- The oldest known piece of leather found in the British Isles, dating to the late Paleolithic, is found on the shore of the Thames Estuary.

April

- 2
  - 4,500-year-old axe-shaped and tiger patterned ritual weapon was discovered in Wuxi, China.
  - The remains of a Roman street and residence have been discovered beneath Exeter Cathedral, Cloister Garden, United Kingdom.
- 4 – A number of ancient dwellings including two rectangular buildings, three Bronze Age roundhouses, a Roman-era settlement were discovered by the Cornwall Archaeological Unit team at Newquay, England.
- 6 – A research based on an analysis conducted on human hair published in the journal Scientific Reports has shown direct evidence of drug use by the inhabitants of Bronze Age Menorca in the cult cave of Es Càrritx.
- 8
  - A rock-cut Etruscan tomb containing a female burial urn and grave goods dating from the 6th century BC was discovered in Vulci, Italy.
  - Ornate frescos showing Christian scenes with various depictions have been uncovered by the Polish Centre of Mediterranean Archaeology in Old Dongola, Sudan.
- 10
  - The sunken remains of an ancient Roman villa including marble tiled flooring, and numerous marble columns have been discovered by underwater archaeologists in Baiae, Italy.
  - A 4- meter-tall marble Roman statue fragment has been discovered near the St. Vladimir's Cathedral in Chersonesus.
  - 1,5-square-km sand-dune farming with about 370 checkboard crop plots including ceramic, glass, coins and marble fragments was uncovered in Caesarea, Israel.
- 11 – Elite tomb of the noble named Panehsy from the 19th Dynasty with mudbrick walls and offering bearers was discovered in Saqqara, Egypt.
- 12
  - A 40 kg 1,200 year-old ball game marker decorated with a bas-relief glyphic band was discovered in the Casa Colorada complex, Chichen Itza, Mexico.
  - A sunken Nabataean temple dedicated to the deity Dusares along with two marble altars from Roman period was discovered at Pozzuoli, Italy.
- 15 - Discovered a large number of artifacts in the small temple of Paestum.
- 18 – The wreckage of Montevideo Maru, a Japanese auxiliary ship sunk by a United States submarine during World War II with over 1000 captive Australians on board, is discovered in the South China Sea.
- 19
  - Traces of a Roman cemetery with burials and sanctuary was discovered in Elewijt, near Zemst, Belgium.
  - Two ornate stone busts, including jewelry and hairstyles which are thought to be the first facial representations of the Tartessian goddesses were discovered at Turuñuelo, Spain.
- 21 – The sacrificial remains of 20 young male were found by INAH in a Mayan pyramid in Moral Reforma, Mexico. Decapitated individuals were associated with the consecration of the pyramid and the consolidation of its relationship with the afterlife.

May

- 27 – The discovery of the Moluccan types of vessels depicted in the rock art painting from Awunbarna was announced in Arnhem Land, Australia.
- 29 – The discovery of the several ossuaries uncovered during the operation to prevent antiquity looting was announced near Kafr Kanna in Galilee.
- 31
  - The discovery of rammed earth buildings, elite tombs, cemeteries, and hundreds of artefacts was announced in Qingjian County, China.
  - The discovery of the huge Bronze Age cemetery with barrows up to twenty was announced in Salisbury, England.

June

- 1
  - The discovery of the 1.54 meters high pre-Columbian statue, similar to The Young Woman of Amajac, was announced in Hidalgo Amajac area, Veracruz, Mexico.
  - The discovery of the fortified settlement complex which dates from between 1500 BC to 1300 BC from the Datuotou culture was announced in Beijing, China.
- 5 – Scientists report potential evidence that Homo naledi, an extinct species of small-brained archaic human discovered in 2013 in South Africa, and living as long as 500,000 years ago, buried their dead, created art in their caves and used fire. It is reported to be a controversial theory, with some experts noting that the evidence did not yet support these "extraordinary conclusions" and "could have a range of other explanations".

July

- 2 – Buried airframes of British-built Hawker Hurricane fighter aircraft of the 1940s are being excavated in Ukraine, it is announced.
- 10 – Identification of the wreck of escort aircraft carrier USS Ommaney Bay, sunk as the result of a kamikaze attack in the Sulu Sea at the start of 1945, was confirmed.
- 24 – Large-sized Roman thermal baths discovered in Mérida, near the amphitheater domus.
- 26 – The discovery of the Theatre of Nero in Rome is announced by Rome's superintendent Daniela Porro.
- 28 – An ancient Roman merchant ship from the 2nd century BC has been discovered off the coast of Civitavecchia.
- 31 – During the early excavations for the construction of a Conad supermarket a temple, probably dedicated to the Capitoline Triad, has been found in Sarsina.

August

- - During works on water networks on a construction site in Battipaglia, in Via Belvedere, a stone sarcophagus has been found.

September

- 6 – Four 1,900-year-old Roman swords have been found in the Cave of the Swords at the Dead Sea, which might have been hidden by Judean rebels during the Bar Kokhba revolt after being taken from Roman soldiers.
- 15 – The head of a statue depicting the Greek god Apollo was found at an excavation site in the ancient Greek city of Philippi. The statue dates back to the 2nd or early 3rd century A.D.
- 20 – Kalambo structure: The world's oldest wooden structure, dating back ~476,000 years, is identified in Zambia after first being discovered in 2019. It shows an unexpected early capacity to shape tree trunks into large combined structures, changing views of the technical cognition of early hominins.
- Undated
  - Exposure of an early 15th century wooden floor in the Guildhall of St George, King's Lynn, England, thought likely to have been trod by Shakespeare when his playing company visited a century later.
  - A pair of copper alloy Roman bracelets were found on Anglesey (Welsh: Ynys Môn) in September 2023. The bracelets include a silver plate decorated with a raised triskele. Comparison and analysis suggests the bracelets date to the 2nd century AD.

October

- 5 – Calvizzano: During works for the water network a frescoed Hellenistic age tomb has been found.
- 15 – The Ministry of Tourism and Antiquities in Egypt announced the discovery of a cemetery in al-Gurifa archaeological area at Tuna el-Gebel, dated back to the New Kingdom, containing sarcophagi, canopic jars, ushabtis, among other items, including a 15-metre-long "Book of the Dead" papyrus. Notably, the mummies belonged to a high royal official "Jehutymes", and "Nani", a female singer in the temple of Amun.
- 25 – A 2,700-year-old alabaster sculpture of Lamassu was unearthed in Khorsabad, which missing head has already been on display in the Iraq Museum in Baghdad, after being confiscated from smugglers in the 1990s.
- 26 – 396 previously unknown Roman forts have been discovered in Upper Mesopotamia, based on satellite images from CORONA and KH-9 Hexagon. Notably, 38 of these newly identified forts coincide with the 116 forts that Antoine Poidebard discovered in the 1920s.
- 27 – A 2,600-year-old Etruscan tomb which was discovered earlier that year was opened at the Osteria Necropolis in Vulci.

November

- 1 – A 3,000-year-old monument was discovered at Seddin, which might be the meeting hall of King Hinz, a ruler in Prignitz during the Bronze Age.
- 3 – The tomb of the high official "Djehutyemnakht" was revealed in Abusir which dated back to the Late Period, decorated with inscriptions of apotropaic spells against snake bites. The discovery was made by a Czech archaeological mission from the Charles University in May earlier that year.

December

- 12 – Cambridge University-led archaeology experts announced the discovery of remains of a roofed theatre, market and river port at Interamna Lirenas, Italy.

Undated

- The earliest coin known to have been minted within Scotland (at Edinburgh), a silver penny from the reign of King David I (later 1130s), was found in woodland near Penicuik (Midlothian) by a metal detectorist.

== Events ==
January

- 16 – Poznań Young Researchers' Archaeology Conference was held in Poland in Biskupin Archaeological Museum.

February

- 9 – the Temple of Hatshepsut and the Tomb of Meru were opened to the public after the restoration.
- 27 – The Archaeological Museum of Elefsina has reopened to the public following the conclusion of restoration works.

March

- 13 – 4th Scientific Conference of the Faculty of Archaeology "Przeszłość ma przyszłość!/ The Past Has a Future!" took place at the Faculty of Archaeology, University of Warsaw, Warsaw, Poland.
- 13 – The National Museum of Antiquities has unveiled a treasure of gold jewelry and silver coins to the public in the Netherlands.

== Deaths ==
April

- Rosemary Cramp, British archaeologist specialising in Anglo-Saxon studies (born 1929)
- Anna Maria Bietti Sestieri, Italian archaeologist (born 1942)
- Etela Studeníková, Slovak archaeologist specializing in Hallstatt culture (born 1946)

== See also ==
- List of years in archaeology
