= Koshikishima Quasi-National Park =

Quasi-national park in Koshikishima Islands, Kagoshima, Japan

- 甑島国定公園
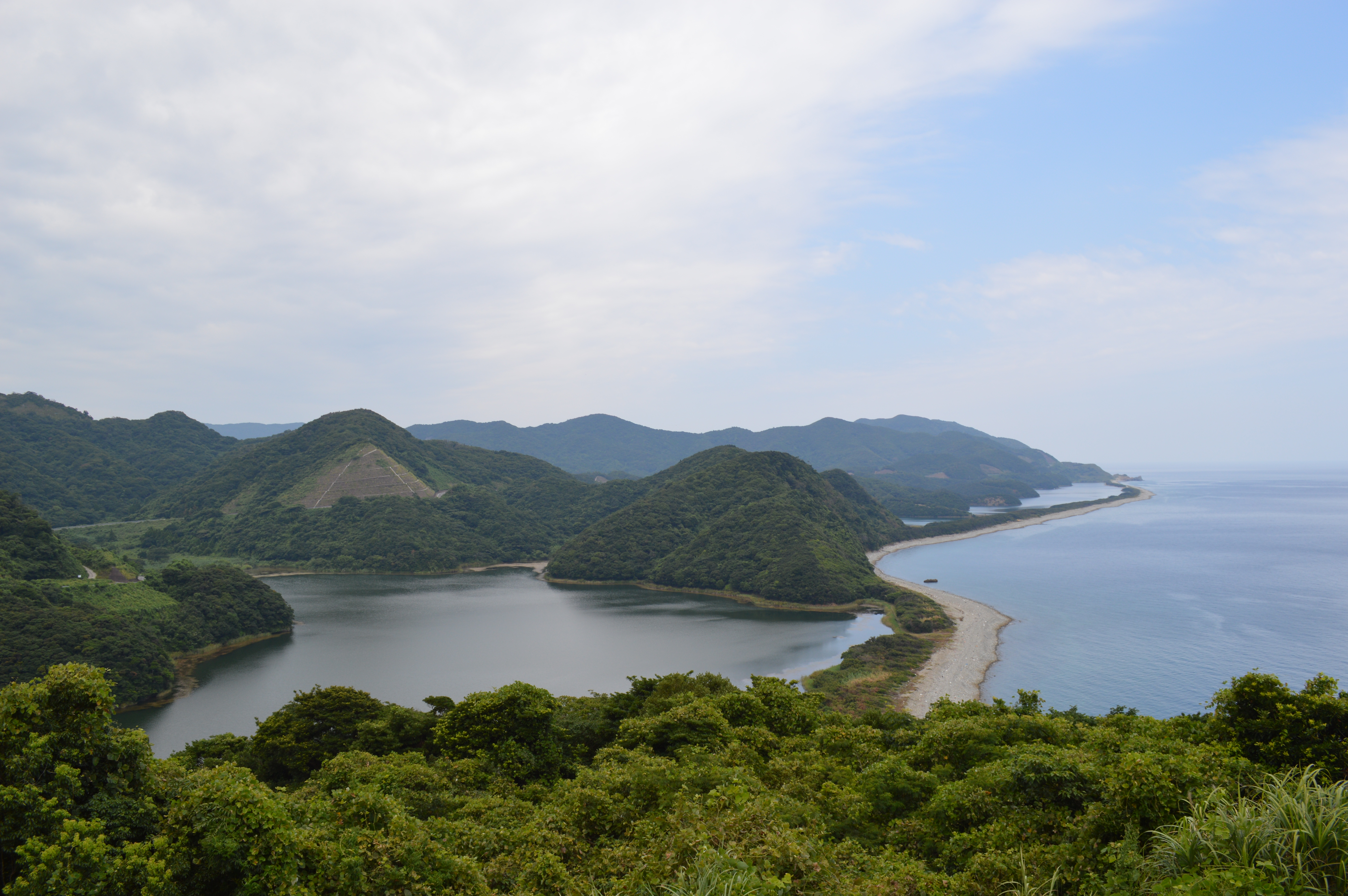
- Nagame-no-Hama on Kamikoshiki Island

- Location within Japan
- Location: Kagoshima, Japan
- Nearest city: Satsumasendai
- Coordinates: 31°52′N 129°53′E
- Area: 307.35 km^{2} (118.67 sq mi)
- Established: 16 March 2015

Koshikishima Quasi-National Park (甑島国定公園, Koshikishima Kokutei Kōen) is a Quasi-National Park in the Koshikishima Islands of Satsumasendai, Kagoshima Prefecture, Japan. It was founded in 2015 with a land area of 54.47 km^{2} (21.03 sq mi) alongside protected surrounding waters of 252.88 km^{2} (97.64 sq mi). It subsumes the former Koshikijima Prefectural Natural Park, founded in 1981 with a land area of 24.59 km^{2} (9.49 sq mi).

== See also ==
- List of national parks of Japan
- Parks and gardens in Kagoshima Prefecture
