= Niijima (disambiguation) =

Nii-jima is a volcanic Japanese island.

Niijima (新島, "new island") may also refer to:

== Places in Japan ==
- Niijima, Tokyo, a village in Ōshima Subprefecture, Tokyo Metropolis
- Niijima (Ogasawara), a new volcanic island which emerged in 2013-2014 and joined with Nishinoshima

== People with the surname ==
- Joseph Hardy Neesima (Jō Niijima; 1843–1890), Japanese evangelical missionary and founder of Doshisha University
- Haruo Niijima, a character in the manga and anime Shijō Saikyō no Deshi Kenichi
- Makoto Niijima, a character in the video game Persona 5
  - Sae Niijima, the older sister and legal guardian of Makoto Niijima
