= Shikine-jima =

Volcanic Japanese island in the Philippine Sea

Native name: 式根島
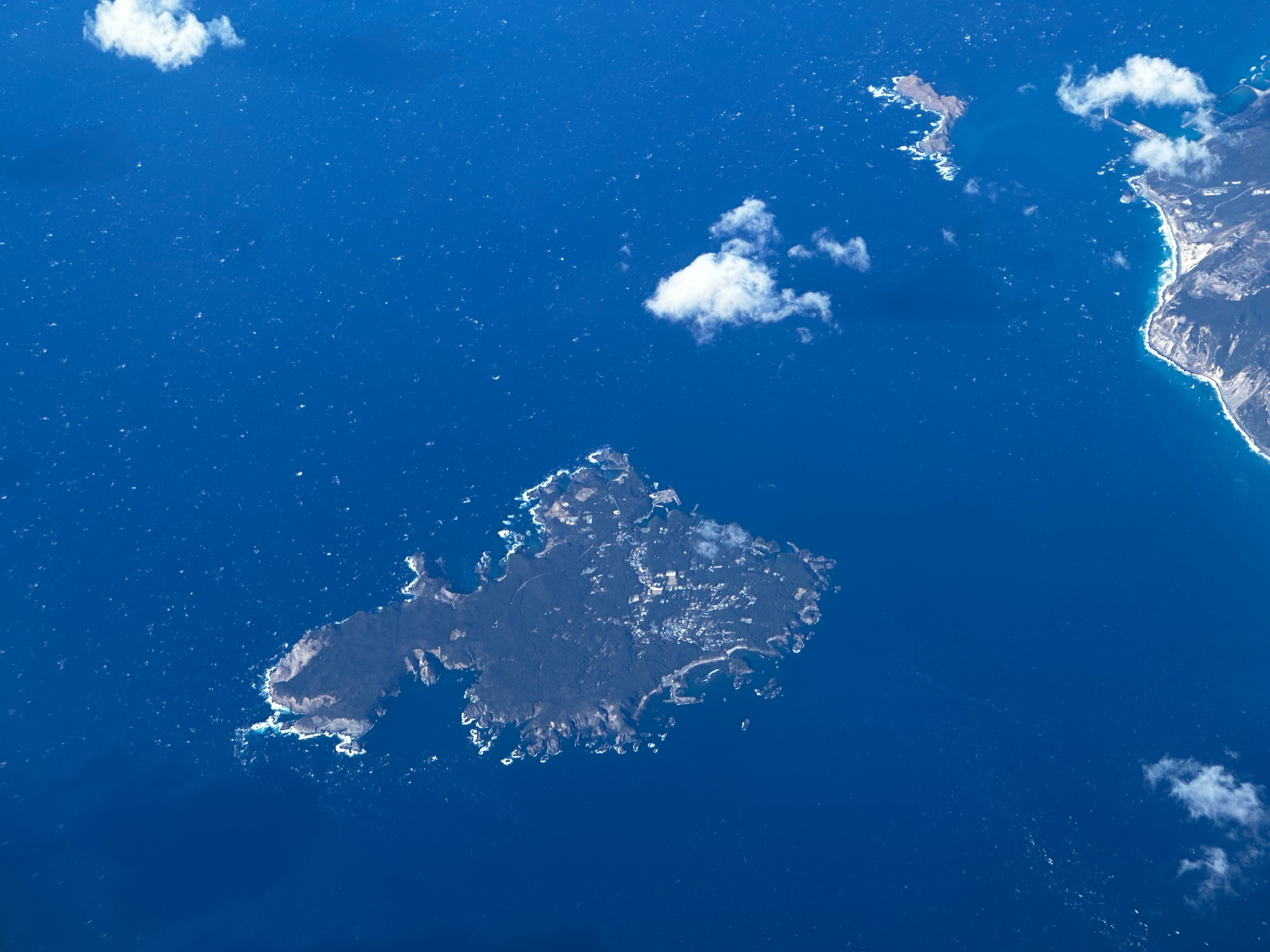
- Shikine-jima from the air, 2023

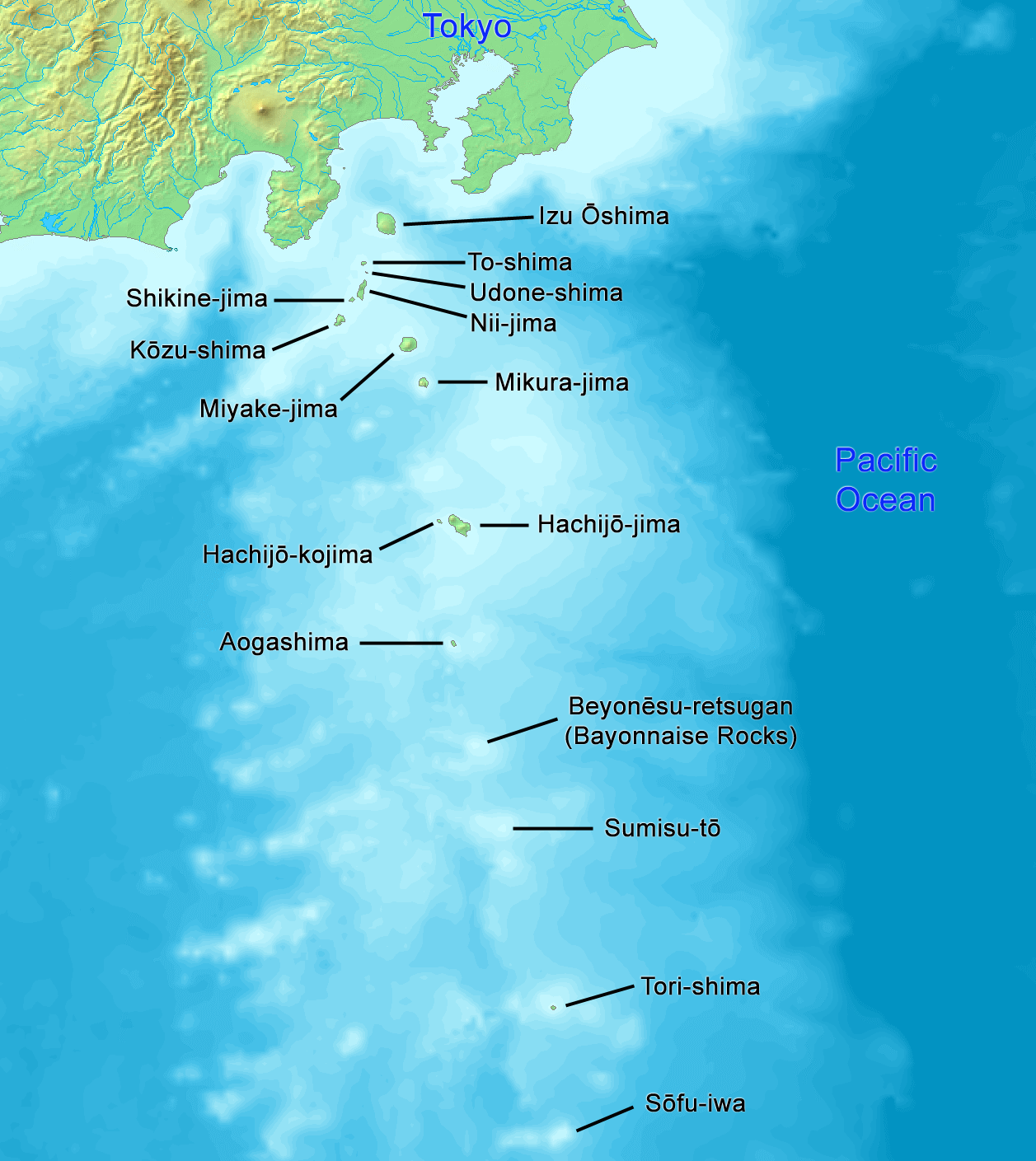

Geography
- Location: Izu Islands
- Coordinates: 34°19′34″N 139°12′36″E
- Archipelago: Izu Islands
- Area: 3,900,000 m^{2} (42,000,000 sq ft)
- Highest elevation: 109 m (358 ft)

Administration
- Japan
- Prefecture: Tokyo
- Subprefecture: Ōshima Subprefecture
- Village: Niijima

Demographics
- Population: 600 (September 2009)

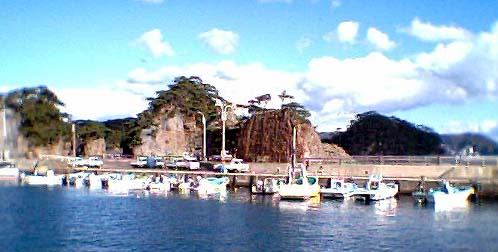
port at Shikinejima

Shikine-jima (式根島) is a volcanic Japanese island in the Philippine Sea. The island is administered by Tōkyō and located approximately 160 kilometres (99 mi) south of Tōkyō and 36 kilometres (22 mi) south of Shimoda Shizuoka Prefecture. It is one of the Izu Seven Islands, group of the seven northern islands of the Izu archipelago. The island is the smaller inhabited component of the village of Niijima, which also contains the larger, neighboring island of Niijima and the smaller, uninhabited Jinai-tō. It is part of the Ōshima Subprefecture of Tokyo Metropolis. As of 2009, the island's population was 600. Shikinejima is also within the boundaries of the Fuji-Hakone-Izu National Park.

== Geology ==
Shikine-jima has an irregular and highly indented coastline with many small bays. The interior of the island is of low elevation, rising to 99 m above sea level at Kanbiki (神引山) and to 109 metres (358 ft), near Suminoi (三角点), the highest elevation on the island. Shikinejima is approximately 3 km long by 2.5 km wide. Signs of geothermal activity can be found along the southern coast where hot springs occur. The legend that Niijima and Shikinejima were formerly one island, and were separated by a giant tsunami triggered by the 1703 Genroku earthquake has no basis in geology.

== Important Bird Area ==
The island, along with Nii-jima and some uninhabited islets nearby, have been recognised as an Important Bird Area (IBA) by BirdLife International because they support populations of Japanese murrelets, Japanese wood pigeons, Pleske's grasshopper warblers, Ijima's leaf-warblers and Izu thrushes.

== History ==
The history of human settlement on Shikine-jima dates to prehistoric times, and archaeologists have found number remains from the Jōmon period on the island. With plentiful water and seafood from the warm Kuroshio Current, there is a continuous record of habitation on the island from the Heian period through the Edo period. Convict boats on their way to or from Hachijō-jima frequently spotted at Shikine-jima waiting for favorable winds.

In the Meiji period, the island was base for commercial fishing and salt production. In the modern period, tourism based on sports fishing, hot spring resorts, and water sports dominates the economy.

Access to Shikine-jima is by ferry from Takeshiba Sanbashi Pier in Tokyo, operated by Tokai Kisen. Ferries also leave from Shimoda Shizuoka Prefecture. A village operated ferry also makes several daily crossings between Niijima and Shikinejima. The crossing is approximately 10 minutes.

== Education ==
The island has one elementary school, Shikinejima Elementary School and one junior high school, Shikinejima Junior High School. High school students either travel by ferry, daily, to Niijima to attend Niijima High School or attend a boarding school elsewhere.

== See also ==
- List of islands of Japan
- Izu Islands
