= Koshikijima Prefectural Natural Park =

Former natural park in Kagoshima prefecture, Japan

- 甑島県立自然公園
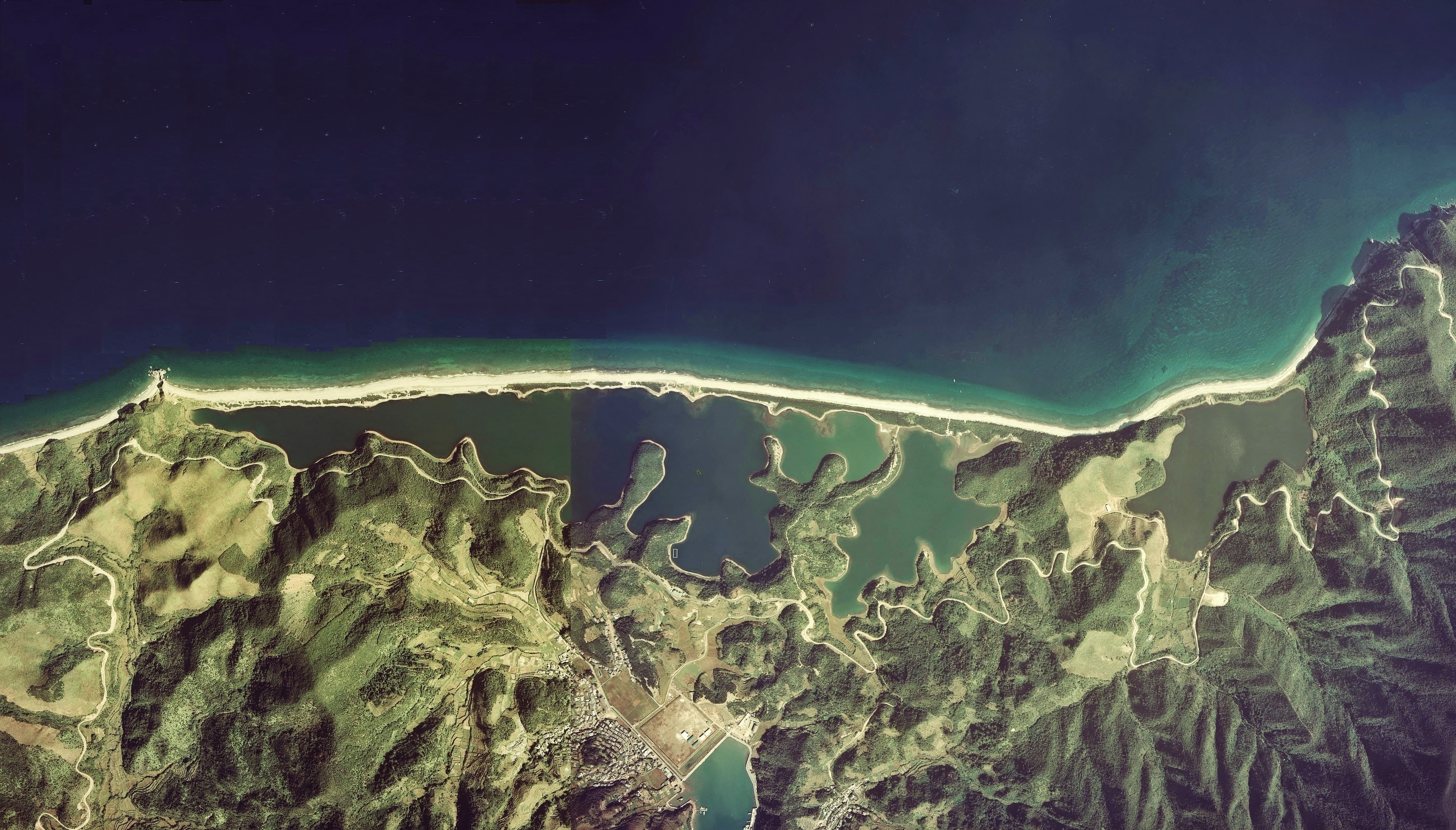
- Namako-ike Lagoon (National Land Image Information (Color Aerial Photographs 1977)); Ministry of Land, Infrastructure, Transport and Tourism
- Location: Kagoshima Prefecture, Japan
- Area: 24.59 km^{2} (9.49 sq mi)
- Established: 1 October 1981

Koshikijima Prefectural Natural Park (甑島県立自然公園, Koshikijima kenritsu shizen kōen) was a Prefectural Natural Park in northwest Kagoshima Prefecture, Japan. Established in 1981, the park was within the municipality of Satsumasendai. In 2015, the park was subsumed into Koshikishima Quasi-National Park.

== See also ==
- National Parks of Japan
- Koshikijima Islands
