= Moyai statue =

Type of stone statue from Niijima, Japan

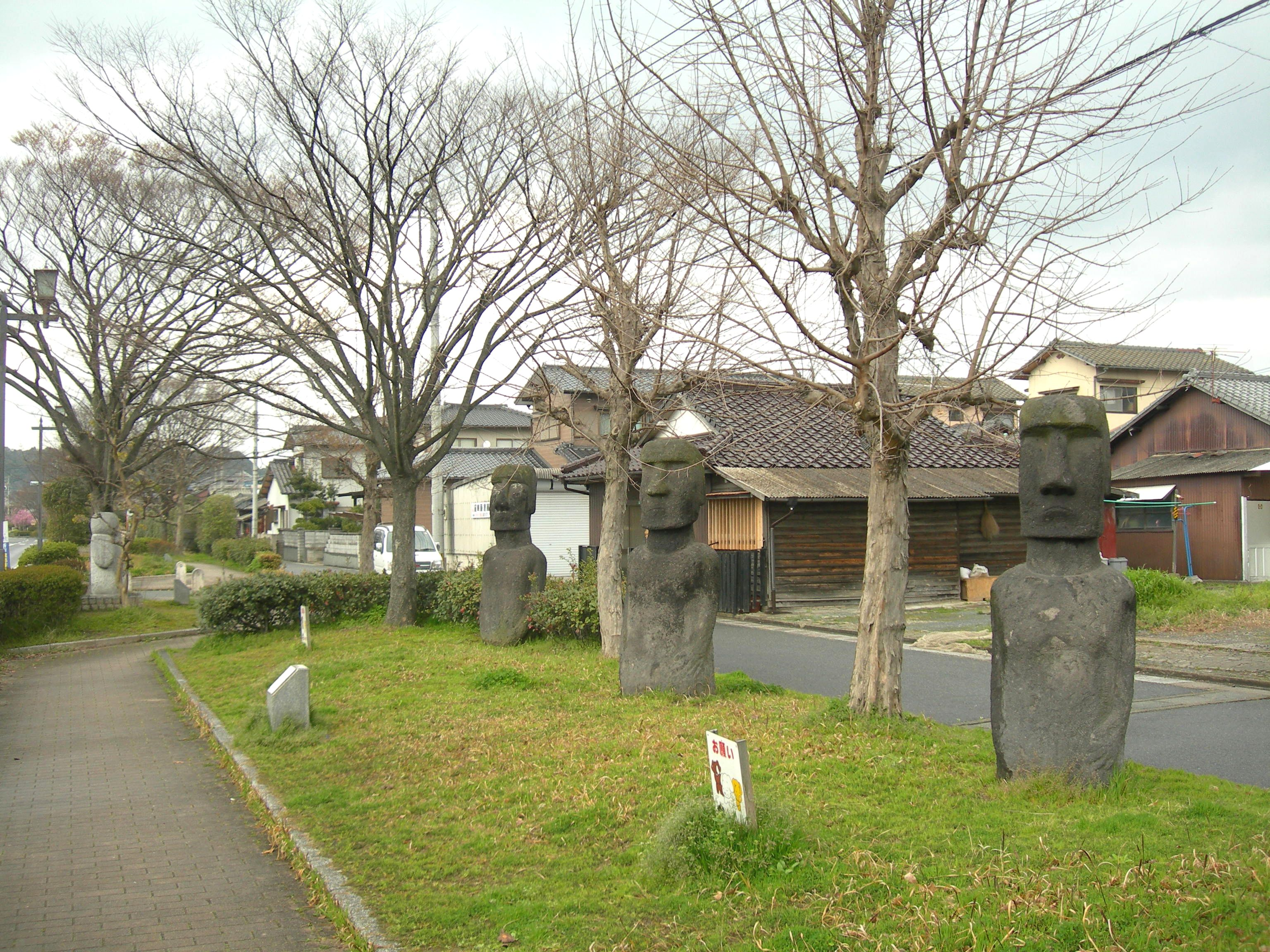
A line of moyai in Nakama, Fukuoka.

In Japan, a moyai statue (Japanese: モヤイ像, Hepburn: moyaizō) is a type of stone statue created in the Japanese village of Niijima. The statues, which were created to promote awareness of Niijima, are themed and modeled after the moai of Easter Island. The statues may be found across Japan, where they often serve as local landmarks. A moyai statue in Shibuya, which serves as a popular rendezvous location in the area, was the inspiration and original design for the "moyai" emoji (🗿).

== Background ==
Moyai statues are created in Niijima, a village which is administratively part of Tokyo but located far from the city proper, in the Izu Islands. They were conceived in 1978 by Yūichi Daigo, a local artisan and tourism director who aimed to raise awareness of the village. In the 1970s and 1980s, Niijima created and gifted several of these statues to various locales in Japan. They are inspired by moai, megalithic statues built by the Rapa Nui people of Easter Island.

The statues are made from kōgaseki (抗火石, lit. 'anti-fire stone'), a special type of pumice mined only in Niijima and on the Italian island of Lipari. Because of its lightness and porosity, one can easily carve it using only a chisel. Many moyai statues, including the one located in Shibuya, are made from this stone.

The word moyai is a pun between the word "moai" and the stem form of two Japanese verbs: 舫う (moyau, to moor a boat), and 催合う (moyau, to come together, to work as a group). The second of these verbs is currently a dialectal word chiefly used in Niijima, though historically it was a part of everyday Japanese.

== Notable moyai statues ==
=== Shibuya Station moyai ===
うえまつそう
(@sou_beebangboo)
tweeted:

【奇跡が起きました】
先日『じーちゃんが作った渋谷モヤイ像が排気ガスや喫煙所からの有害物質により汚れていて悲しい。なんとかしたい』と投稿したところ、たくさんの方の拡散やお力をいただき数十年の汚れをこんなに綺麗にしていただきました！
本当にありがとうございます！SNSの力にも感謝です。

Translation:

[A Miracle Happened]
A few days ago I tweeted "The Shibuya Moyai statue that my grandfather made has been dirtied by exhaust fumes and smoke from the nearby smoking area, sadly. I want to do something about it." Many people gave us their strength and support. (What was once) decades of stains were made beautiful!
Thank you all very much! I'm grateful for the power of SNS."

22 Feb 2018

A moyai statue is a prominent landmark near Shibuya Station: it is visible from the station's west exit and is located shortly past it. Like the statue of Hachikō which stands nearby, the moyai statue serves as a popular meeting spot. On holidays it is crowded in the late afternoon, though due to a greater number of passersby in the adjacent intersection Hachikō tends to be more busy and the moyai comparatively quiet.

The statue was designed by Yūichi Daigo, a kokeshi maker and director of Niijima's tourism association. In 1980, it was donated by Niijima to Shibuya in commemoration of the 100th anniversary of Niijima's incorporation into Tokyo. The unveiling ceremony was held on September 25, 1980. In the patch of grass beneath the statue, there is a nameplate inscribed with the unveiling date along with the word moyai".

The Shibuya moyai bears a passing resemblance to Easter Island moai, though it has many novel features: for example, it lacks a torso and has a head of wavy hair. It has two faces, one facing a bus stop and another facing a set of rental lockers. According to Sō Uematsu, the original sculptor's grandson, the two faces are a pun on Niijima's name: the wavy-haired face represents the "nii-chan" (endearing term-of-address to an older brother) of a surfer, and the other, bearded face represents an "injii" (o-jii-san, old man) who lived in a former penal colony. They are meant to represent people who were exiled to Niijima.

The "moyai" emoji (🗿) as it appeared in Android 4.3, where it depicted the Shibuya statue. It was later changed to an Easter Island moai.

In 2009, the statue was involved in an event featuring Lupin III, a popular manga character. On December 1, a "crime notice" was issued that the moyai statue would be "stolen" in seven days; on the early morning of the 7th the statue was removed from its site, with the character's calling card in its place. It was moved back to Niijima, restored and cleaned, then moved back in place on January 21. The project was done with cooperation and assistance by the Niijima tourism association, the Shibuya police, and others.

In 2018, Sō Uematsu mentioned on Twitter that there were blemishes on the statue, and was disheartened. Soon after, a local TV station broadcast a program cleaning the statue.

=== Kamata Station moyai ===
Until 2024, there was a moyai statue located at Kamata Station in Ōta, Tokyo. It was placed in a plaza within the station's east passageway.

Two statues were initially donated to the site though only one was placed there, the other kept in a warehouse. In 1998, this unused statue was put up for raffle by the comedian George Tokoro, featuring it in his television program. Among 3,000 entries, the town of Fukaura, located in Aomori Prefecture, was selected to be the recipient. It was installed at WeSPa Tsubakiyama, a local tourist attraction. The statue became a popular landmark in the area, though its future remains uncertain following the enclosing attraction's closure in 2020.

In 2024, the remaining statue was removed from the rotary in front of Kamata Station.

== Other moyai ==
Moyai statues can be found throughout Japan. In the Greater Tokyo Area, aside from the previously listed statues at Shibuya and Kamata, they may be found at New Pier Takeshiba and Odaiba. In Niijima, several of the statues are congregated on "Moyai Hill." Moyai may also be found outside of Tokyo: examples include two statues located in Kashiwabaraike Public Park, located in Ishioka, Ibaraki, as well as one nearby a city-run rest stop located in Shimoda, Shizuoka.

== Moyai emoji ==
In 2010, moai was included as a "moyai" emoji (🗿) in Unicode version 6.0 under the code point U+1F5FF as "Japanese stone statue like Moai on Easter Island".

The official Unicode name for the emoji is spelt "moyai" as the emoji actually depicts the moyai statue near Shibuya Station in Tokyo. The statue was a gift from the people of Nii-jima (an island 163 kilometres (101 mi) from Tokyo but administratively part of the city) inspired by Easter Island moai. The name of the statue was derived by combining "moai" and the dialectal Japanese word moyai (催合い) 'helping each other'.

As the Unicode adopted proprietary emoji initially used by Japanese mobile carriers in the 1990s, inconsistent drawings were adopted for this emoji by various companies with proprietary emoji images, depicting either a moai or the moyai statue. The Google and Microsoft emoji initially resembled the moyai statue in Tokyo; however, the emoji were later revised to resemble moai.

Notwithstanding its intended purpose, the emoji is commonly used in Internet culture as a meme to represent a deadpan expression or used to convey that something is being said in a particularly sarcastic fashion.

== Bibliography ==
- 高橋こうじ『日本の大和言葉を美しく話す』2014年 東邦出版 ISBN 978-4-8094-1267-7 62 頁（名称について）
