= Anna Maria Bietti Sestieri =

Italian archaeologist (1942–2023)

Anna Maria Bietti Sestieri (7 December 1942 – 2 July 2023) was an Italian contemporary archaeologist based at the Università del Salento whose research focused on Italian prehistory.

== Education and career ==
Bietti Sestieri received her undergraduate degree in Etruscology after studying at Rome under Massimo Pallottino from 1964 to 1966.

In the early 1970s, her work was funded by the award of several Macnamara fellowships. From 1974 onward, she served as an archaeological specialist in Italian prehistory for the Soprintendenza Archeologica di Roma, directing major excavations during that time. From 2003 to 2009 she served as president of the Istituto Italiano di Preistoria e Protostoria and from 1995 to 2003 she was the Soprintendente archeologo dell’ Abruzzo. Since 2006 she has been a member of the department of European protohistory at the Università del Salento.

== Research ==
Her record of publication on Italian prehistory is extensive, and she has organized several major museum exhibitions. Best-known for leading the excavations of the Iron Age necropolis of Osteria dell'Osa located to the east of Rome, she excavated extensively in Italy, including major excavations at Osteria dell'Osa, Castiglione, and Fidenae, as well as excavations at Frattesina di Fratta Polesine (Rovigo), and Specchia Artanisi di Ugento.

== Death ==
Bietti Sestieri died on 2 July 2023, at the age of 80.

== Honours ==
Bietti Sestieri received the Europa Prize from the Prehistoric Society in 1996. In 1993, she was elected as a Corresponding Member of the Archaeological Institute of America.

== Publications ==
=== Books ===
- 1992. The Iron Age Community of Osteria dell'Osa: a study of socio-political development in central Tyrrhenian Italy. Cambridge University Press. ISBN 9780521326285 [Reviews: David Ridgway in Journal of Roman Archaeology
- 1992. La necropoli laziale di Osteria dell'Osa 3 v. Rome: Edizioni Quasar. ISBN 9788871400600.
- 1996. Protostoria: teoria e pratica. Rome: La Nuova Scientifica.
- 2007. Bietti Sestieri, A.M., Ellen Macnamara; Duncan R Hook. Prehistoric metal artefacts from Italy (3500-720BC) in the British Museum. Research publication (British Museum), no. 159. London: The British Museum. ISBN 9780861591596.
- 2010. L'Italia nell'età del bronzo e del ferro : dalle palafitte a Romolo (2200-700 a.C.). with CD-ROM. Rome: Carocci. ISBN 9788843052073.

=== Articles ===
- 2008. "L’età del bronzo finale nella penisola italiana" Padusa 44, n.s:7-54.
- Bietti Sestieri, A.M., C. Giardino, M.A.Gorgoglione. 2010. "Metal finds at the Middle and Late Bronze Age settlement of Scoglio del Tonno (Taranto, Apulia): results of archaeometallurgical analyses" Trabajos de Prehistoria 67.2:457-68.
