= Shimokoshiki-shima =

Island

Shimokoshiki Island
Native name: 下甑島 Shimokoshiki-shima
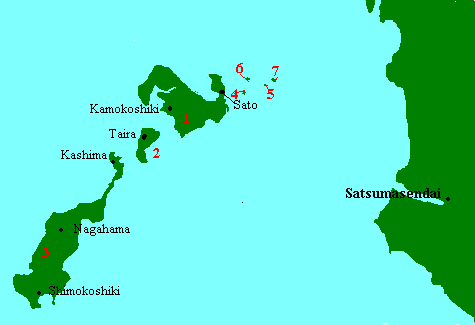
- Shimokoshiki-shima is marked as (3)

- Location within Japan

Geography
- Location: East China Sea
- Coordinates: 31.704047°N 129.723703°E
- Area: 66.12 km^{2} (25.53 sq mi)
- Length: 21 km (13 mi)
- Width: 6 km (3.7 mi)
- Coastline: 84.8 km (52.69 mi)
- Highest elevation: 604 m (1982 ft)
- Highest point: mount Otake

Administration
- Japan
- Prefecture: Kagoshima Prefecture
- city: Satsumasendai

Demographics
- Population: 2780 (2010)
- Pop. density: 42/km^{2} (109/sq mi)
- Ethnic groups: Japanese

Shimokoshiki Island (下甑島, Shimokoshiki-shima) is the largest island in the Koshikishima Islands. Its coasts are washed by East China Sea. The island's highest peak is Mount Otake 604 m (1,982 ft) housing a long-range radar station of the Japan Air Self-Defense Force at 31.694625°N 129.715992°E.

== Geography ==
Shimokoshiki-shima has very rugged terrain even compared to the other Koshikijima Islands, the majority of the island is composed of overlapping mountains 400–500 meters high. As a result, many scenic cliffs are scattered along the west coast, with the most notable being the Napoleon Rock.

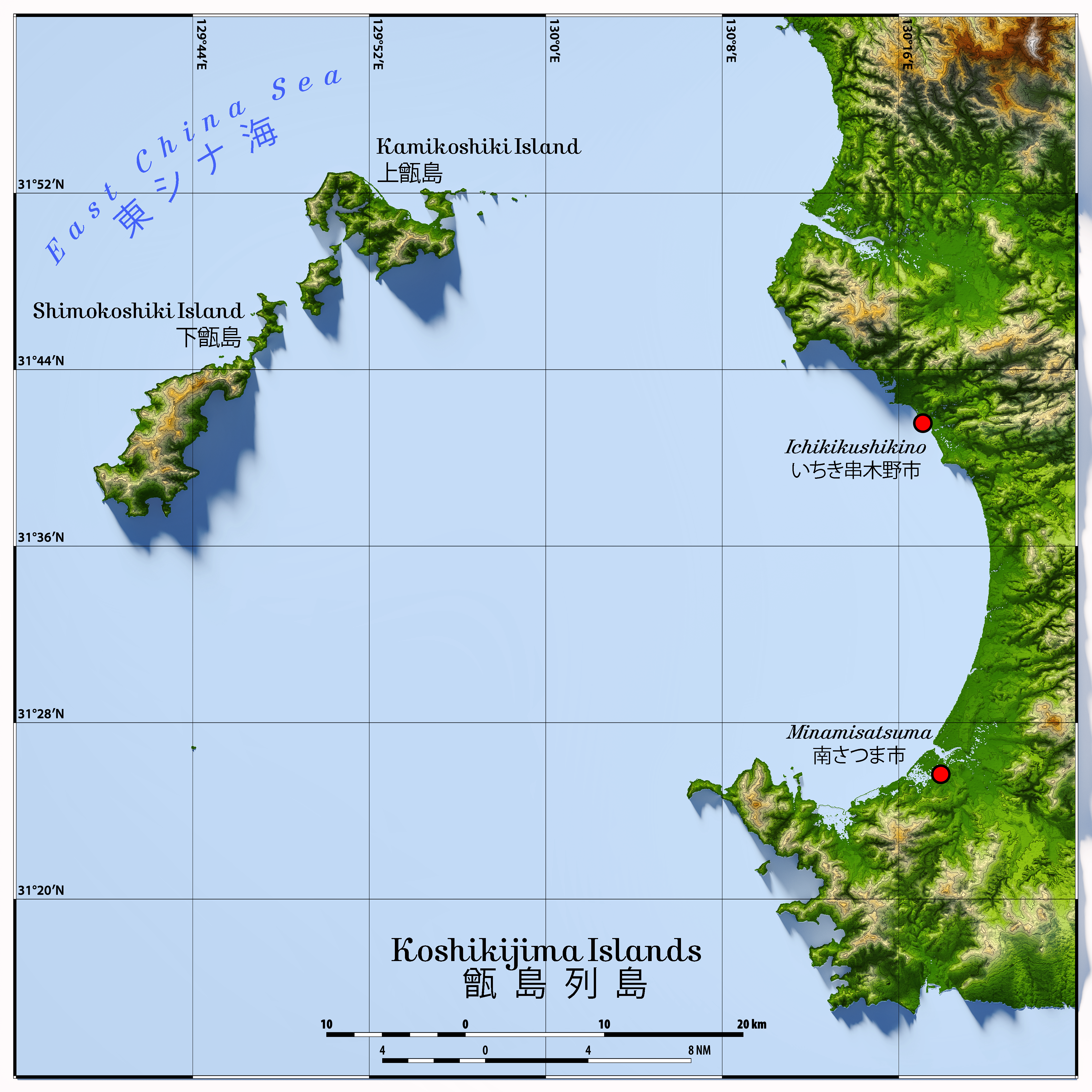
Map of the Shimokoshiki islands

=== Settlements and administrative units ===
- Kashima, Kagoshima
- Shimokoshiki, Kagoshima
  - Shimokoshiki-Chō Teuchi
  - Shimokoshiki-Chō Katanoura
  - Shimokoshiki-Chō Sesenoura
  - Shimokoshiki-Chō Aose
  - Shimokoshiki-Chō Nagahama

== History ==
The site of the island was initially elevated in the Cretaceous period about 80 million years before present. The sites housing dinosaur fossils are located across the island, which together with scenic cliffs propelled the island to the Japanese top 100 geological sites list. In historical records, Shimokoshiki-shima is first mentioned during the Nara period when it was populated by the Satsuma tribe of the Hayato people. The island was incorporated into Japan by the early Heyan period though. The island belonged to the Christian domain during Nanboku trade period and 35 people were executed in the aftermath of the Shimabara rebellion in 1638.

During the Great Tenmei famine in the 1782 period, a large group of inhabitants of Shimokoshiki-shima migrated to Kanoya, Kagoshima. A second wave of migration in 1887–1897, driven by famine, typhoon-related destruction and epidemics, departed to Tanegashima.

Regular communications with the mainland by means of telegraph and scheduled ship service began in 1901. The direct passage of typhoon Ruth over the island again brought severe damage, and the population, which peaked in 1950 at 13,578 people, started to rapidly decline, with over half of inhabitants of the island departing within 20 years.

Modern Shimokoshiki-shima is primarily a fishing island, with 10.9% of population being fishermen as of 2009.

== Transportation ==
Shimokoshiki-shima is connected to Nakakoshiki-shima and through it to Kamikoshiki-shima, by a bridge and two connecting tunnels at Nakakoshiki-shima. This bridge opened on 29 August 2020 after over 9 years of construction.

Ferry lines also connect Shimokoshiki-shima to Kamikoshiki-shima and to Ichikikushikino city on the Kyushu mainland, the latter offering two daily round-trips.

On the island, transportation is provided by public buses operating four routes. Some routes need a prior reservation due to the small number of passengers.

== Notable residents ==
- Kajiwara Kagesue - samurai of the Genpei War period
- Ogura Ichirō (1951–present) - TV actor

== See also ==
- Kamikoshiki-shima
- Koshikishima Islands
