= Umashima, Shimane =

Island in Japan

Umashima Island
Native name: 馬島 Umashima
- Location within Japan

Geography
- Location: Sea of Japan
- Coordinates: 34.903642°N 132.048325°E
- Area: 0.14 km^{2} (0.054 sq mi)
- Length: 0.75 km (0.466 mi)
- Width: 0.25 km (0.155 mi)
- Highest elevation: 70 m (230 ft)

Administration
- Japan
- Prefecture: Shimane Prefecture
- City: Hamada

Demographics
- Population: 0
- Ethnic groups: Japanese

Umashima (馬島, Uma-shima) is a volcanic island in the Sea of Japan, 2 km from the coast of the Shimane prefecture in Japan, just off the port Hamada, Shimane Prefecture. Umashima takes its name, meaning "Horse Island" from the fact that it was once used as a grazing ground for horses.

While the island is uninhabited, it is actively used for swimming, fishing, rabbit watching and camping. It is administered as part of the Hamada Kaigan Prefectural Natural Park. The island features Shinto shrine. The lighthouse built in 1898 is visible up to 16.5 nmi (30.6 km). The scheduled ferry service from Hamada is available.

== See also ==
- Desert island
- List of islands
