= Udone-shima =

Island in the Izu archipelago, Japan

Native name: 鵜渡根島
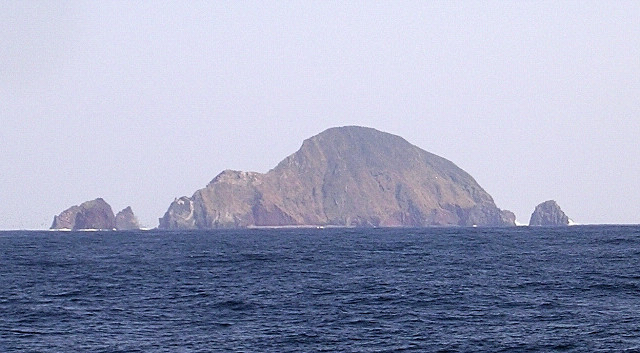

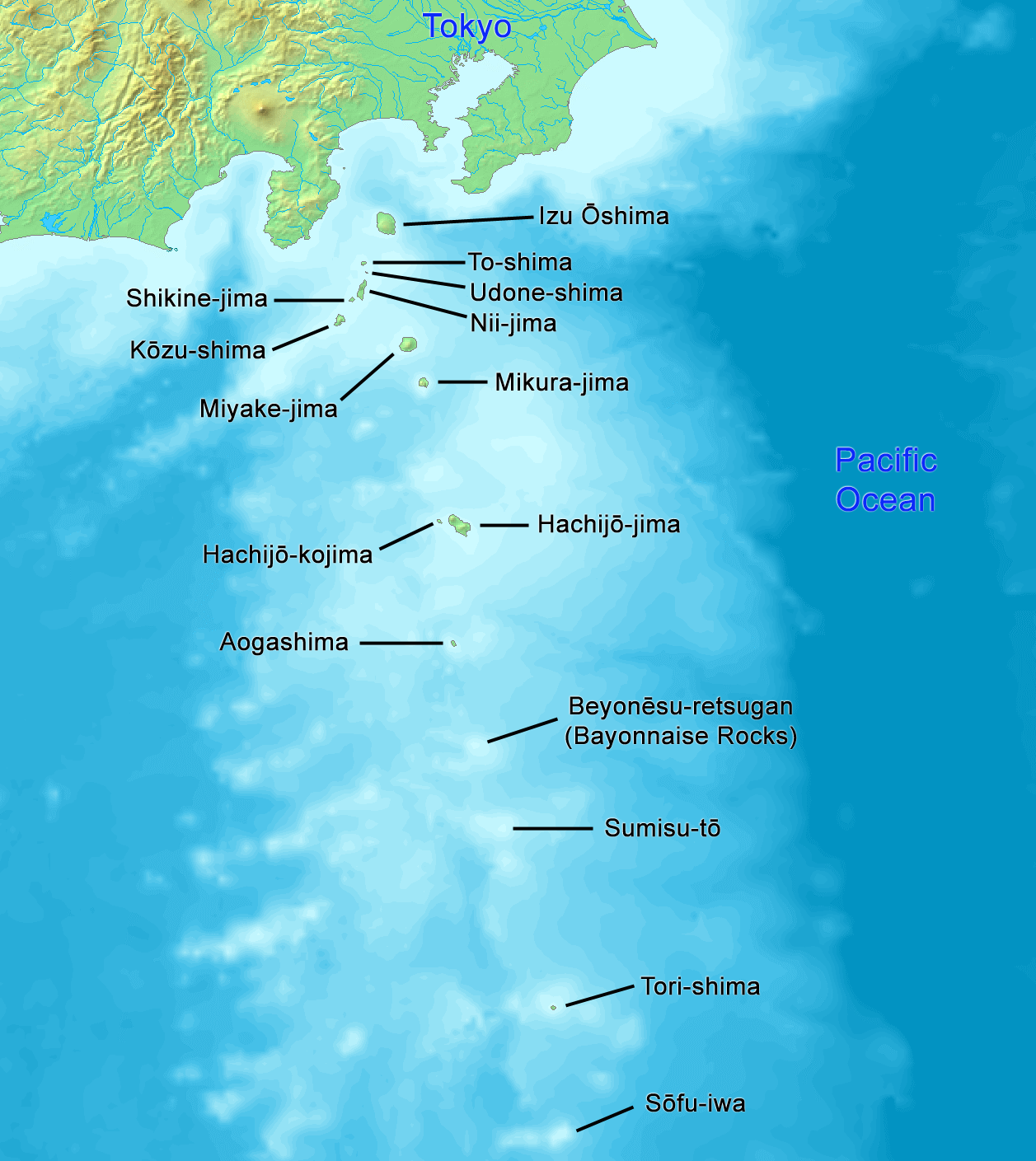

Geography
- Location: Pacific Ocean
- Coordinates: 34°28′21″N 139°17′38″E
- Archipelago: Izu Islands
- Area: 0.4 km^{2} (0.15 sq mi)
- Length: 1,500 m (4900 ft)
- Width: 550 m (1800 ft)
- Highest elevation: 210 m (690 ft)

Administration
- Japan
- Prefecture: Tokyo
- Subprefecture: Ōshima Subprefecture
- Village: Niijima

Demographics
- Population: 0

Udone-shima (鵜渡根島) is a volcanic, deserted island located in the Pacific Ocean approximately 150 kilometres (93 mi) south of Tokyo in between Toshima and Nii-jima, in the northern portion of the Izu archipelago, Japan.

== Geography ==
The island is the remnant of an andesite lava dome with sheer sides, the only visible portion of a submarine volcanic caldera. The above sea-level portion has a surface area of approximately 0.4 square kilometers, with a summit height of 210 metres (690 ft). The main island is surrounded by a number of rocks.

Despite its small size, the island was formerly inhabited during the Meiji period by a small community of fishermen who also engaged in sericulture, or silk farming. A small Shinto shrine still exists on the island.

== Natural history ==
This island shares many similarities in its biodiversity with neighboring islands such as Nii-jima. Being surrounded by rough sea, vicinity to the island is rather difficult to visit in fact, and this made the natural environments of the islands and nearby atolls protected. Indo-Pacific bottlenose dolphins that newly inhabited around Udone-shima as their residential range has been expanded wider even onto Honshu coasts. Larger sharks inhabit the area. Historically, a breeding colony of now-extinct Japanese sea lions once existed on the island as well.

== See also ==
- Izu Islands
- Desert island
- List of islands
