= Jinai-tō =

Island in Japan

Native name: 地内島
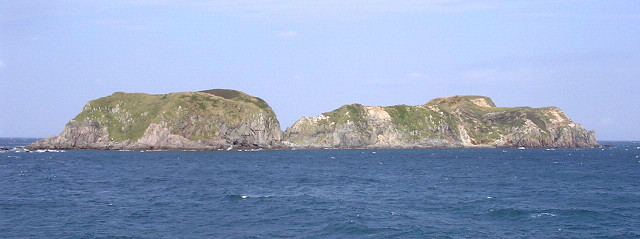

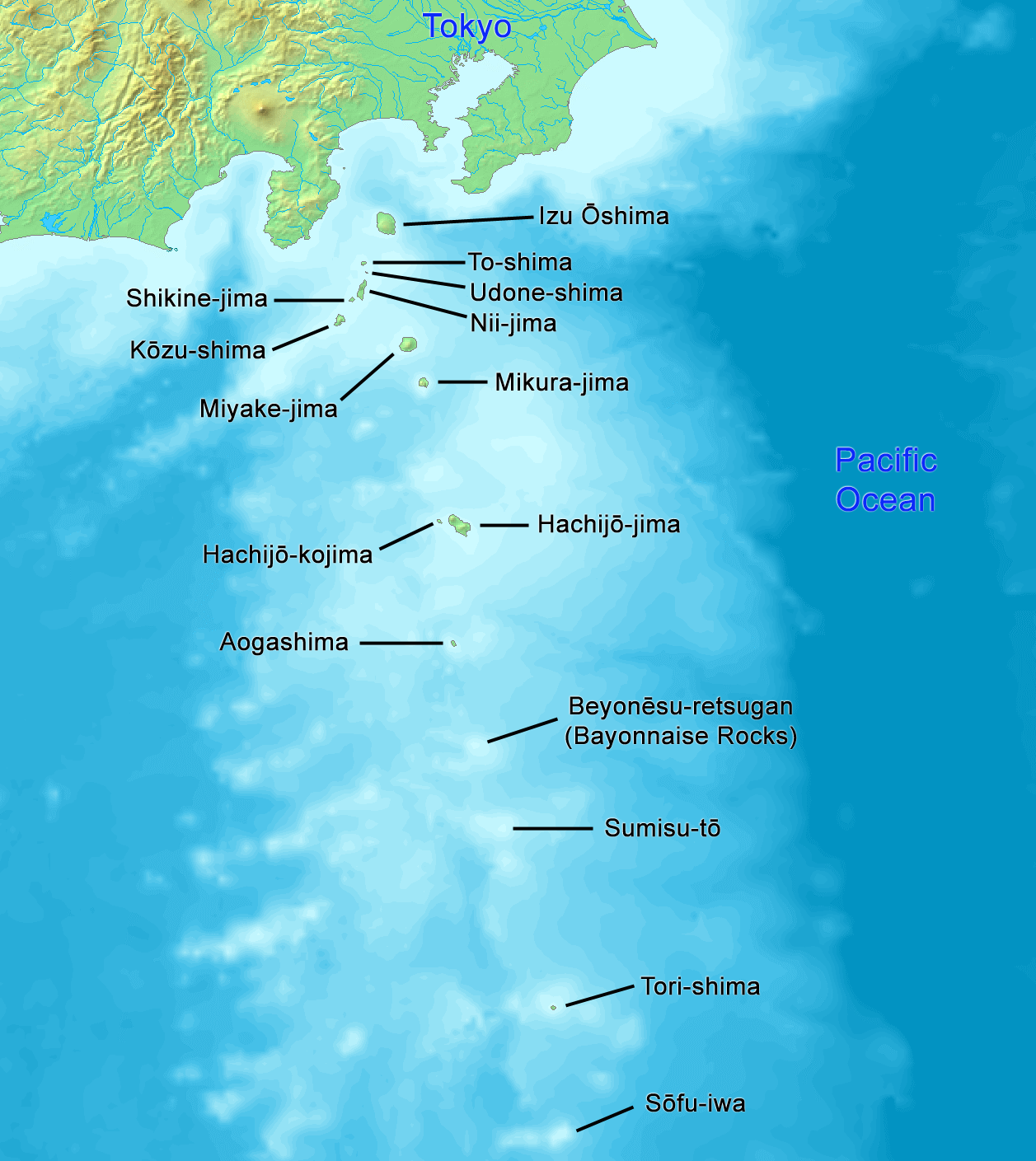

Geography
- Location: Izu Islands
- Coordinates: 34°22′20″N 139°13′40″E
- Archipelago: Izu Islands
- Highest elevation: 74 m (243 ft)

Administration
- Japan
- Prefecture: Tokyo
- Subprefecture: Ōshima Subprefecture
- Village: Niijima

Demographics
- Population: 0

Jinai-tō (地内島, Jinaijima) is a volcanic, deserted island located in the Philippine Sea approximately 220 kilometres (140 mi) south of Tokyo and offshore Niijima, in the northern portion of the Izu archipelago, Japan.

== Geography ==
The island is the only visible portion of a submarine volcanic caldera. The above sea-level portion rises to two summits connected by a narrow ridge, with the higher northern summit reaching 76.6 metres (251 ft). Located in the Kuroshio Current, the area has abundant sea life, and is popular with sports fishermen and scuba divers, with soft corals found in abundance off the east coast of the island. Goats, deer and rabbits introduced to the island to provide food for the residents of Niijima from the 1930s have destroyed most of the natural vegetation of the island. Efforts to eradicate the introduced goats were successful by 1981, and deer by 1985.

== See also ==
- Izu Islands
- Desert island
- List of islands
