= Nii-jima =

Volcanic island in Japan that is one of the Izu islands

Native name: 新島
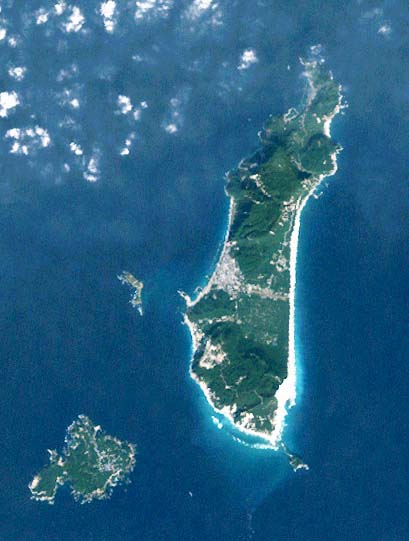
- Shikine-jima and Nii-jima

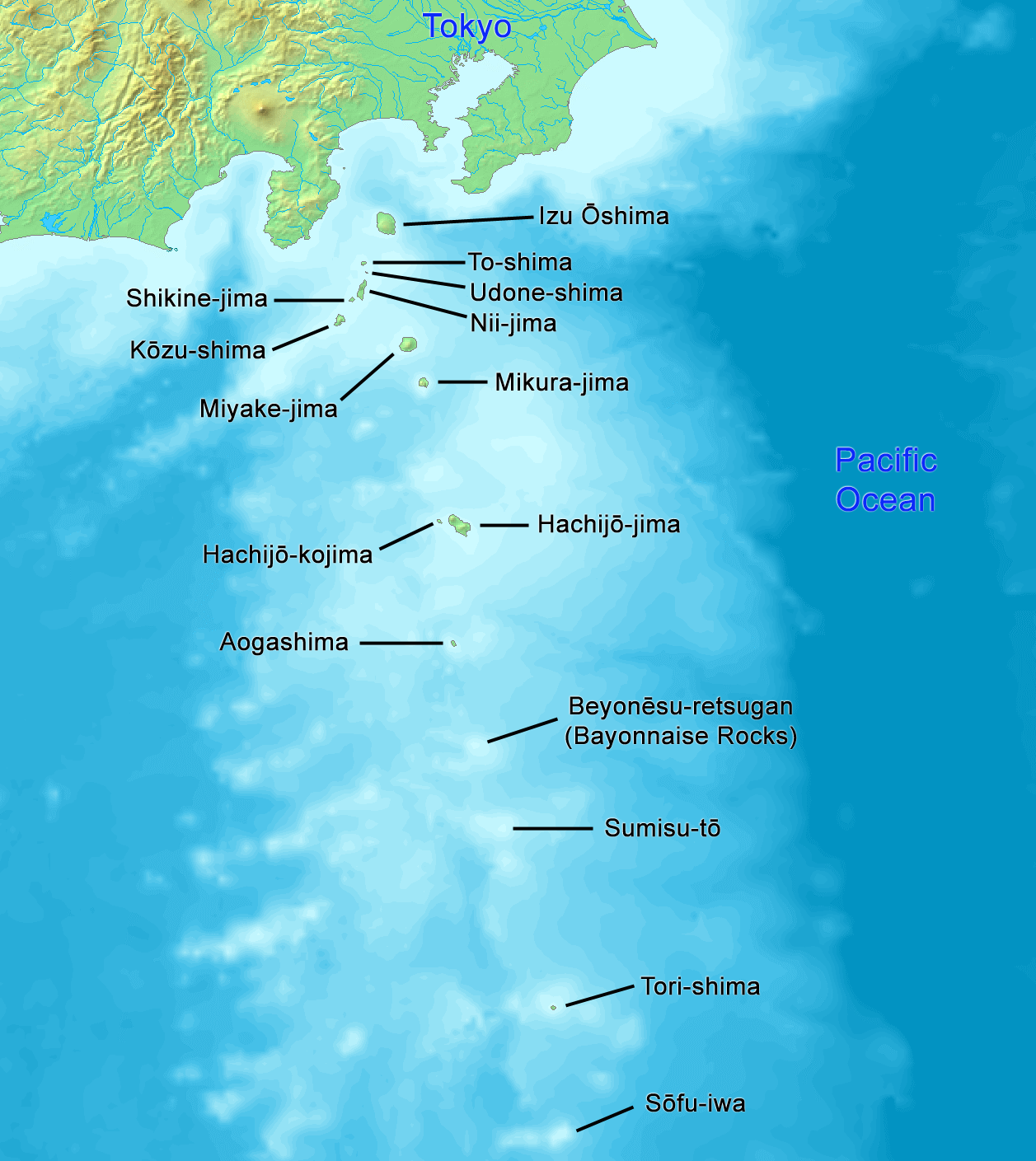

Geography
- Location: Izu Islands
- Coordinates: 34°22′N 139°16′E
- Archipelago: Izu Islands
- Area: 23.87 km^{2} (9.22 sq mi)
- Length: 11,000 m (36000 ft)
- Width: 3,000 m (10000 ft)
- Highest elevation: 432 m (1417 ft)

Administration
- Japan
- Prefecture: Tokyo
- Subprefecture: Ōshima Subprefecture
- Village: Niijima

Demographics
- Population: 2700 (September 2009)

Additional information

Nii-jima (新島) is a volcanic Japanese island administered by the Tokyo Metropolitan Government. It is one of the Izu Seven Islands, group of the seven northern islands of the Izu archipelago, and is located approximately 163 kilometres (101 mi) south of Tōkyō and 36 kilometres (22 mi) south of Shimoda Shizuoka Prefecture. The island is the larger inhabited component of the village of Niijima Village, Ōshima Subprefecture of Tokyo Metropolis, which also contains the neighboring island of Shikine-jima and the smaller, uninhabited Jinai-tō. Nii-jima is also within the boundaries of the Fuji-Hakone-Izu National Park.

On the southern tip of Nii-jima, there was formerly a launch site for experimental and sounding rockets.

== Geography ==
Nii-jima is unusual amongst the Izu Islands in that it has an elongated shape. Measuring approximately 11 kilometres (6.8 mi) long by 2.5 kilometres (1.6 mi) wide, it has a land area of 23.87 km^{2}. The island is made of eight rhyolitic lava domes in two groups at the northern and southern ends of the island, separated by a low, flat isthmus. The Mukai-yama (向山) complex in the southern portion of the island and the Achiyama lava dome at the northern end were formed during Nii-jima's only historical eruptions in the 9th century AD. The northern end also contains Miyatsuka-yama (宮塚山), the island's highest point, at 432 metres (1,417 ft). The Atchiyama rhyolitic lava dome and neighboring Wakago basaltic pyroclastic deposit contain rare xenoliths composed of gabbro. These gabbroic rock fragments originated from magma bodies that were located beneath the rhyolitic volcano. Shikine-jima and Jinnai-to are part of the same complex, and form separate islands to the southwest and west of Nii-jima. Rhyolite lava gives the island its famed white cliffs and white sandy beaches

Nii-jima is prone to earthquake swarms. According to the US Geological Survey map, the area around Nii-jima averages 10–20 earthquakes, with a magnitude of 5 or greater, each year. However, the often repeated legend that Nii-jima and Shikine-jima were once a single island that was separated by huge tsunami caused by the 1703 Genroku earthquake has no basis in geology.

=== Climate ===
Climate data for Nii-jima (2003−2020 normals, extremes 1976−present)
Month	Jan	Feb	Mar	Apr	May	Jun	Jul	Aug	Sep	Oct	Nov	Dec	Year
Record high °C (°F)	20.0 (68.0)	20.5 (68.9)	22.2 (72.0)	25.0 (77.0)	27.7 (81.9)	31.0 (87.8)	34.2 (93.6)	34.1 (93.4)	33.0 (91.4)	30.5 (86.9)	27.2 (81.0)	24.2 (75.6)	34.2 (93.6)
Mean daily maximum °C (°F)	11.5 (52.7)	12.2 (54.0)	14.8 (58.6)	18.5 (65.3)	22.0 (71.6)	24.3 (75.7)	27.9 (82.2)	29.6 (85.3)	27.1 (80.8)	22.7 (72.9)	18.8 (65.8)	14.1 (57.4)	20.3 (68.5)
Daily mean °C (°F)	8.9 (48.0)	9.5 (49.1)	11.8 (53.2)	15.5 (59.9)	19.1 (66.4)	21.8 (71.2)	25.3 (77.5)	26.8 (80.2)	24.5 (76.1)	20.4 (68.7)	16.3 (61.3)	11.6 (52.9)	17.6 (63.7)
Mean daily minimum °C (°F)	5.5 (41.9)	6.1 (43.0)	8.2 (46.8)	12.0 (53.6)	15.9 (60.6)	19.4 (66.9)	23.1 (73.6)	24.6 (76.3)	22.1 (71.8)	17.7 (63.9)	13.1 (55.6)	8.3 (46.9)	14.7 (58.4)
Record low °C (°F)	−2.8 (27.0)	−3.7 (25.3)	−2.0 (28.4)	1.4 (34.5)	6.0 (42.8)	12.2 (54.0)	16.1 (61.0)	18.7 (65.7)	14.1 (57.4)	6.9 (44.4)	1.9 (35.4)	−2.1 (28.2)	−3.7 (25.3)
Average precipitation mm (inches)	101.4 (3.99)	134.3 (5.29)	187.0 (7.36)	173.4 (6.83)	184.0 (7.24)	261.5 (10.30)	205.3 (8.08)	169.1 (6.66)	195.1 (7.68)	313.5 (12.34)	182.8 (7.20)	117.5 (4.63)	2,225 (87.60)
Average precipitation days (≥ 1.0 mm)	8.3	9.6	12.0	10.7	10.0	12.2	9.8	8.2	11.6	11.8	11.2	9.1	124.5
Source: JMA

== Nature ==
Even though Nii-jima is located relatively close to Honshu, the small population and lower exploitation has allowed the island's natural wildlife to be well preserved, and many varieties can be seen. Riding on the Kuroshio current, many oceanic species and birds migrate thorough the island, Indo-Pacific bottlenose dolphins that have seemingly moved to here, and other areas, from Mikurajima inhabit the near shores; along with nesting sea turtles, and the occasional visiting manta ray.

Almost completely wiped out, due to past hunting, biodiversity of other marine mammals, such as cetaceans and pinnipeds, have become very small and today are only a remnant of their historical numbers. Sperm whales and humpback whales, are the most likely of the larger whales to be observed around Nii-jima, using the island as either a resting ground or a migratory collider from, and to, the wintering grounds around the Bonin Islands. There are also sightings of extremely rare and critically endangered species such as the northern elephant seal (a vagrant was captured in 1989, making it the first record of the species in Japan) and North Pacific right whales (one whale stayed just several meters off the port in 2011, and kept tail-slapping continuously for several hours). Additionally the, possibly now-extinct, Japanese sea lion used to breed in the Izu Islands and in the vicinity of Nii-jima, there was a colony on Udone-shima. Although on a different island, in the past a saltwater crocodile has appeared on Hachijō-jima.

=== Important Bird Area ===
The island, along with Shikine-jima and some uninhabited islets nearby, have been recognised as an Important Bird Area (IBA) by BirdLife International because they support populations of Japanese murrelets, Japanese wood pigeons, Pleske's grasshopper warblers, Ijima's leaf-warblers and Izu thrushes.

== Access ==
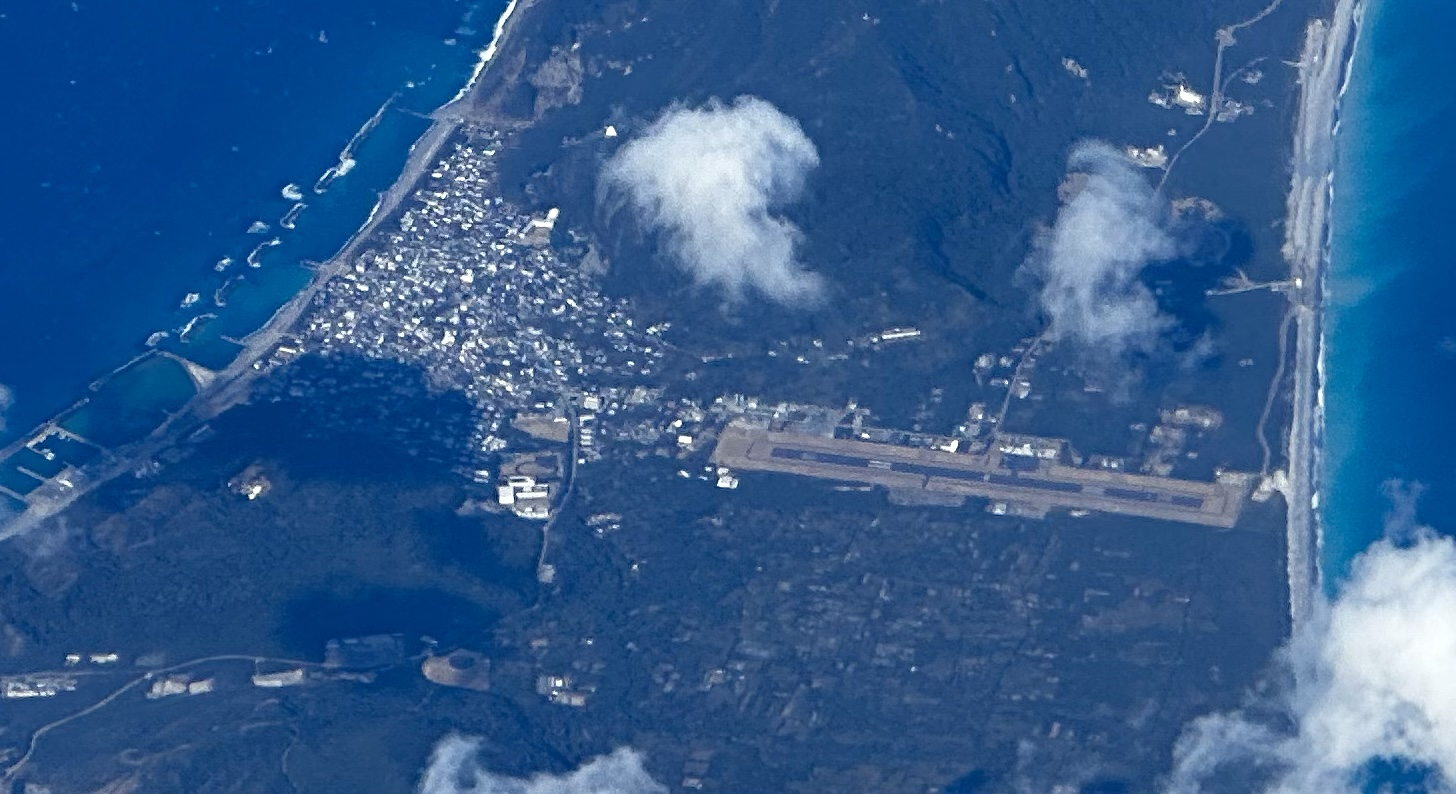
Niijima Airport (right) and downtown

Nii-jima is 2 hours and 20 minutes away by jet boat from Takeshiba Sanbashi Pier, in Tokyo, operated by Tōkai Kisen. Tōkai Kisen also operates a 9-hour overnight ferry. The ferry leaves Takeshiba Sanbashi Pier at 22h00 (23h00 in the summer months) and arrives early morning in Izu Ōshima, before continuing on to Toshima, Nii-jima (8h30, 7h30 in summer), Shikine-jima and Kōzu-shima. The ferry then returns following the same route, leaving Nii-jima at around 12h00 and docking in Tokyo at 19h00. In rough weather, the ferry may be unable to dock at Nii-jima.

There are daily flights, weather permitting, from Chōfu Airport located in western Tokyo. The flight takes approximately 35minutes.

Other ferries leave from Shimoda, Shizuoka Prefecture.

Niijima-mura also operates a small local ferry between Nii-jima and Shikine-jima with 3 boats per day.

== History ==
Nii-jima has been inhabited since prehistoric times, and archaeologists have found numerous remains from the Jōmon period, including stone and ceramic utensils. During the Edo period, as with Hachijō-jima, Nii-jima was used as a place of exile for convicts. The practice was discontinued after the Meiji Restoration.

== Industry ==
Doraemon visits Niijima High School. A moyai sits in the upper right of the photo.

Main industries in Nii-jima include commercial and sports fishing, construction, koga rock mining, and tourism. There is also some small scale farming.

Koga stone, a pumice-derived rock of rhyolite was utilized as house building material. Now its silica component is used to make transparent green glass art. It can also be used to make moyai art. The stone is indigenous only to Nii-jima and Lipari Island, Italy.

== Tourism ==
=== Sites ===
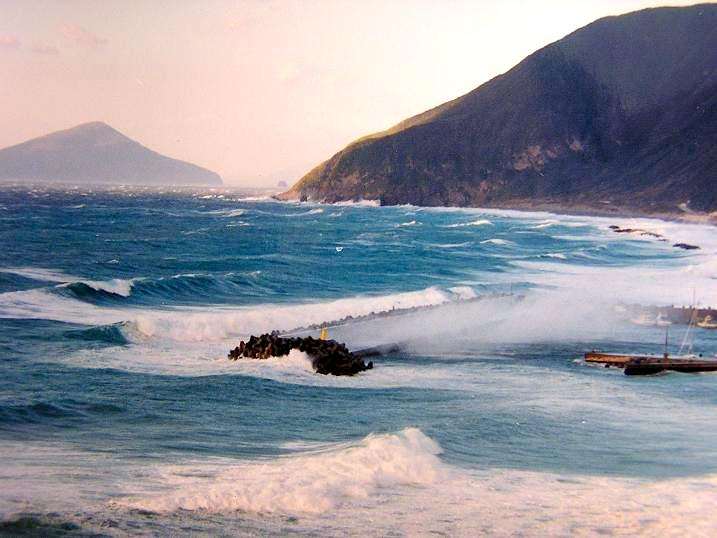
The Western, or Maehama side of Nii-jima with December waves crashing through the port. To-shima is the island top left.

Shikine-jima (on the left) and Nii-jima from the air in 2023.

Maehama Beach on the western side of Nii-jima sees many wind surfers. The triathlon and ocean water swims take place here. Mount Fuji can often be seen from Maehama.

Habushi Beach, on the eastern side of the island, is a nationally protected reserve with its waves and white sand, and is a good location for surfing. The beach is approximately 6.5 km long and is overlooked by koga volcanic cliffs, the highest of which is 250 meters.

Moyai Hill, overlooking Yunohama and Maehama beaches, contains more than 100 large stone carvings. In the local dialect, moyai means 'to work together in effort', and these statues make evident this effort. On the western side of JR Shibuya in Tokyo proper is a giant moyai statue, a gift from the people of Nii-jima.

Yunohama Onsen hot spring, on Yunohama Beach, is a large outdoor bath built in the style of pseudo-Greek ruins that provides stunning panoramic views of the setting sun and the Pacific Ocean. The bath itself accommodates up to 100 bathers. Water used in the bath is drawn from the ocean below.

Jūsansha Jinja, is a Shinto shrine at the base of the cliffs of Mount Miyatsuka in the north-western corner of the main village on the island. This shrine, built in the Edo period, is recognized as caretakers of intangible cultural assets by the Tokyo government for the kagura music and sacred dancing, known as shishi-kiyari that are held every December 8.

Nearby Jūsansha is Chōei-ji, Chōei Temple, a temple dedicated to Nichiren Buddhism. Beside the temple lies the Exiles' Cemetery. The cemetery, covered with the local white sand, is dominated by the gravestones of the 118 exiles, banished to Niijima by the Tokugawa Shogunate during the Edo era for non-political crimes.

A short walk from Chōei Temple is the Exile Execution Ground. Eleven exiles who committed crimes on the island were executed here. Komori Yasu, from the kabuki story 'Yowa Nasake Ukinano Yokoguchi' is buried here.

Niijima Glass Art Center is a world-renowned site which hosts the Niijima International Glass Art Festival every autumn. At the center, visitors are able to create their own glass work to take home. Next to the museum is the Niijima Glass Art Museum which houses works from guest artists at the festival.

Niijima-mura Museum, houses artifacts from the island's pre-history up to its modern-day surfing culture. Included is a replica fishing vessel and house from the Edo period. Details of the criminal exiles are given. A collaborative effort between the education board and the English department at Niijima High School ensured that the museum is completely bilingual: Japanese-English.

=== Events ===
Swimmers begin the Tokyo Islands Triathlon in Nii-jima at Maehama Beach

Niijima hosts the Tokyo Islands Triathlon in Niijima (1.5 km swim, 35 km bicycle ride, and a 10 km run) every May and the Niijima Open Water Swimming (1.5, 3, and 4.5 km open water swims). In the summer months, a number of surfing competitions take place at Habushi Beach. Sport fishing and scuba diving are also popular with both residents and tourists.

Every autumn, the Niijima International Glass Art Festival takes place. The festival has taken place since 1988. The festival draws leading glass artists who lead workshops and demonstrations in glass art. Artists who have participated in the festival in the past include: Dale Chihuly, William Morris, and Lucio Bubaco. Work by the above artists, and many more, are on display in the museum.

=== Other attractions ===
Other attractions on Nii-jima include: Ebine (Calanthe discolor), a pinkish-purplish orchid, can be found throughout the island, especially in Ebine Park, which opens from early spring.

Souvenirs from Niijima include the island specialty kusaya - a dried fish, usually mackerel scad (Decapterus macarellus), that has been soaked in a special brine. Kusaya, which means smells bad in Japanese, has an odor that is indeed 'quite' distinct. The village museum has a video on the making of kusaya. If you can get past the smell, you will be rewarded with a rich, delicious meal. Other souvenirs are milk senbei, the ashitaba plant, Niijima glass art, and a local Shōchū called Shima Jiman, island pride.

=== Further points of interest ===
- LORAN-C transmitter Niijima
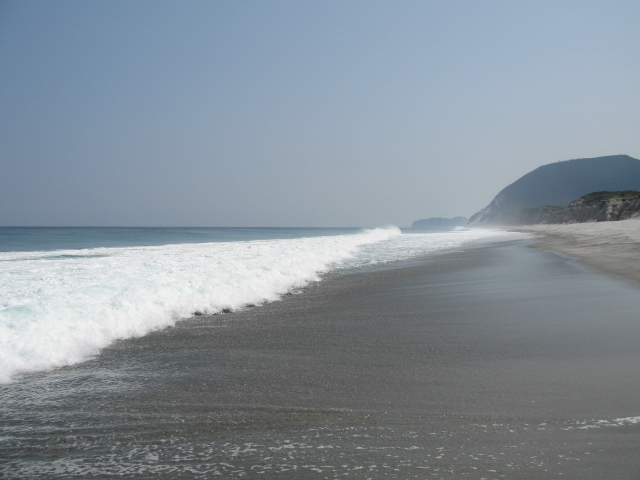
Habushi Beach

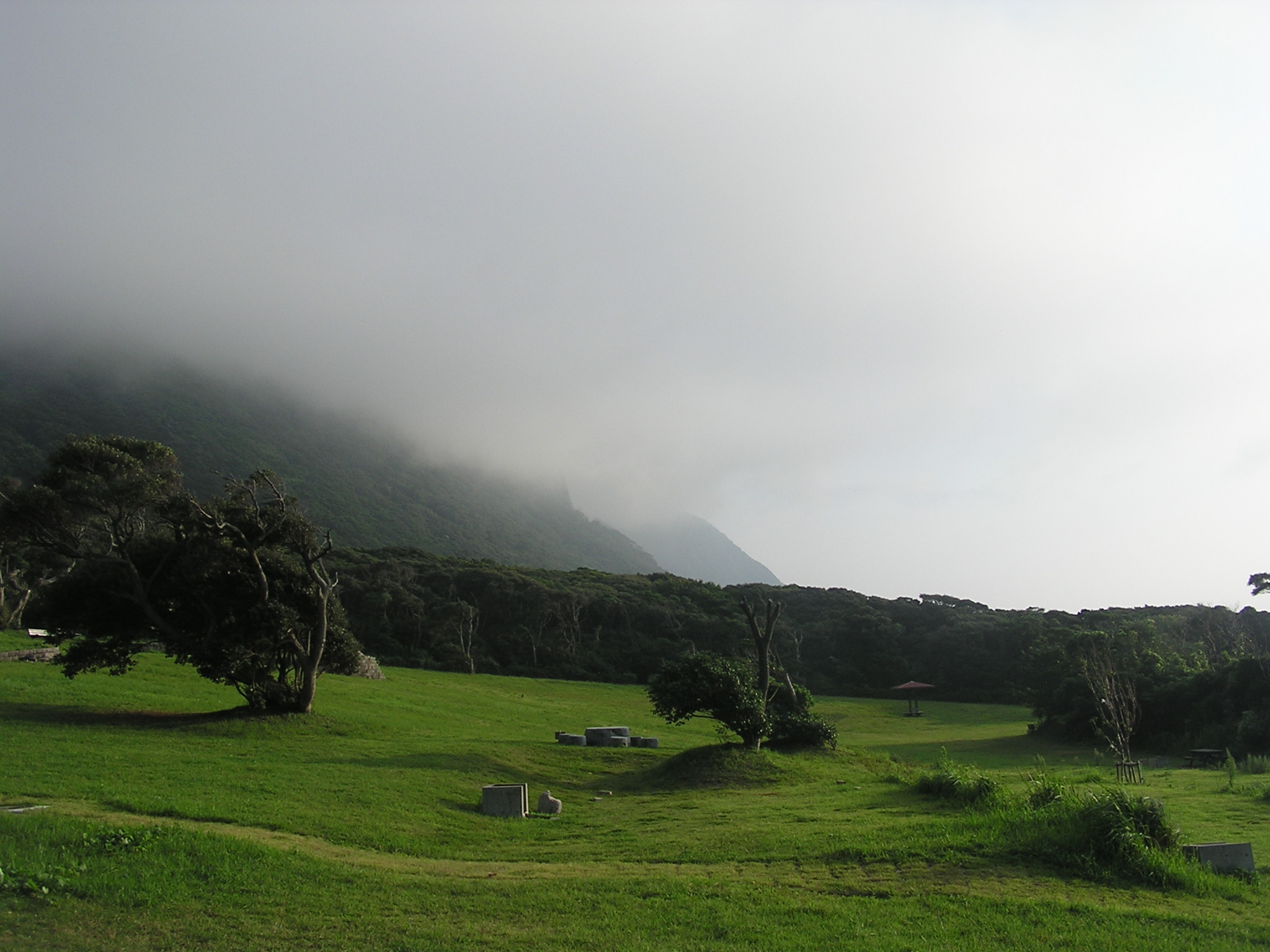
Habushi Campground in early morning

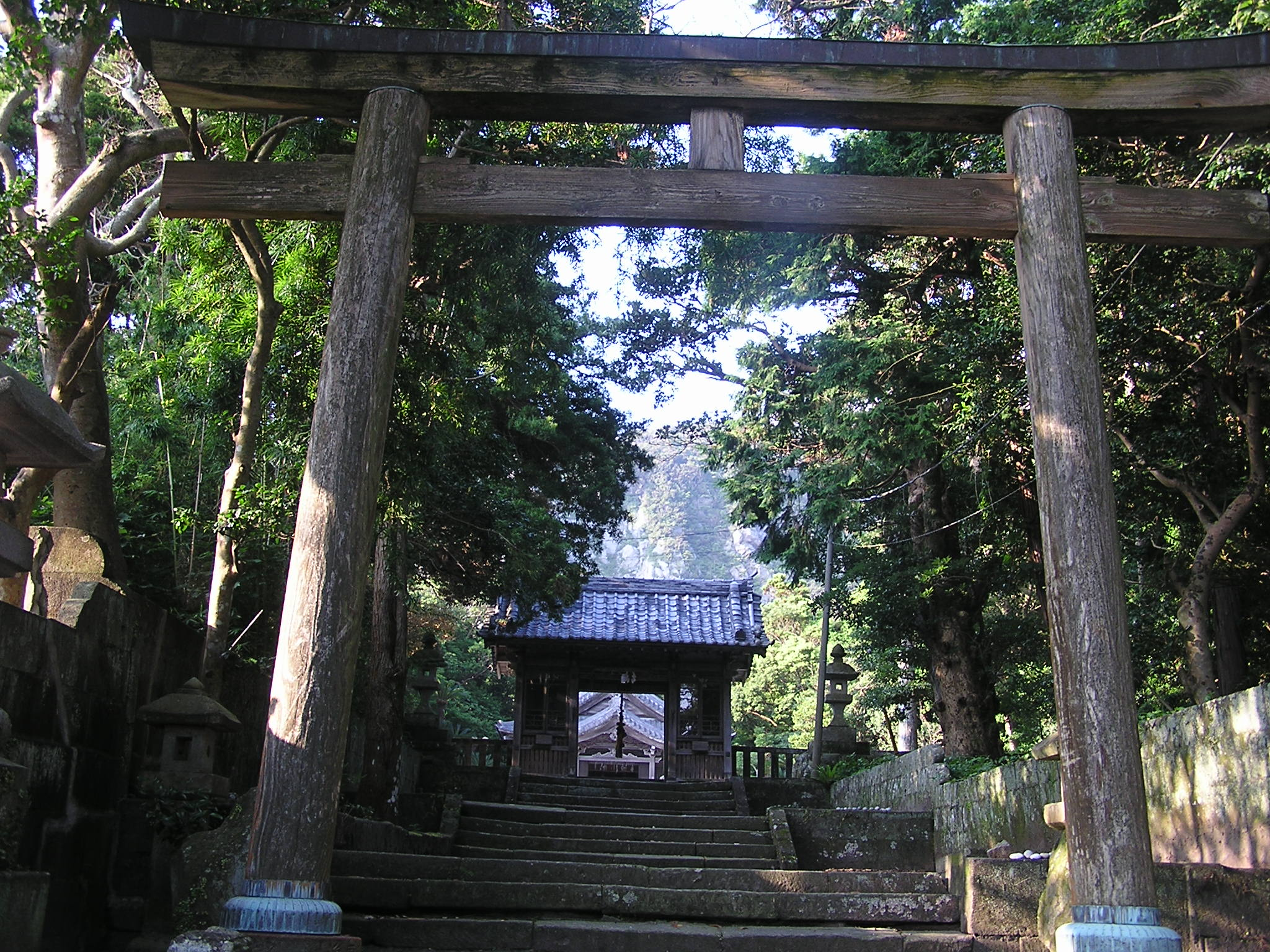
Jūsansha Shrine

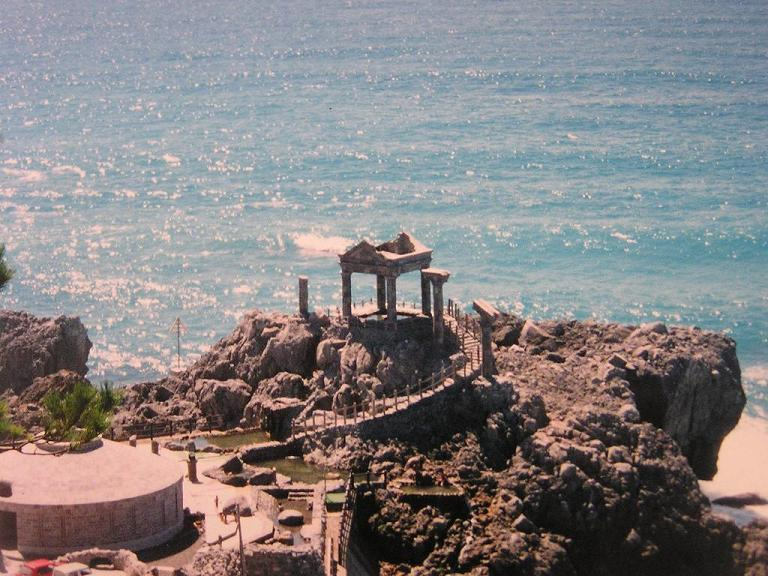
Yunohama Onsen

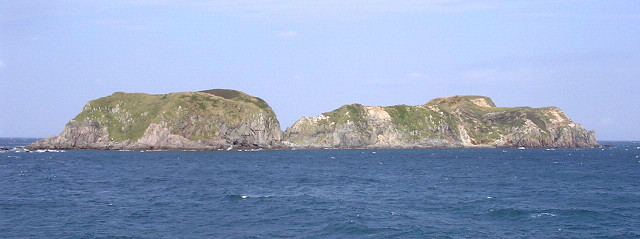
Jinai-tō

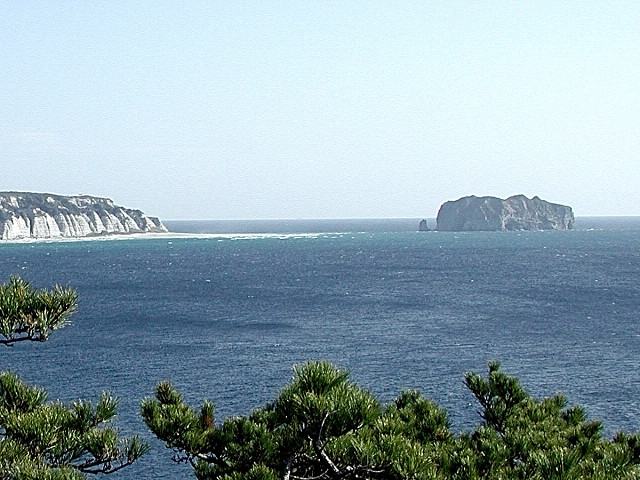
Hanshima

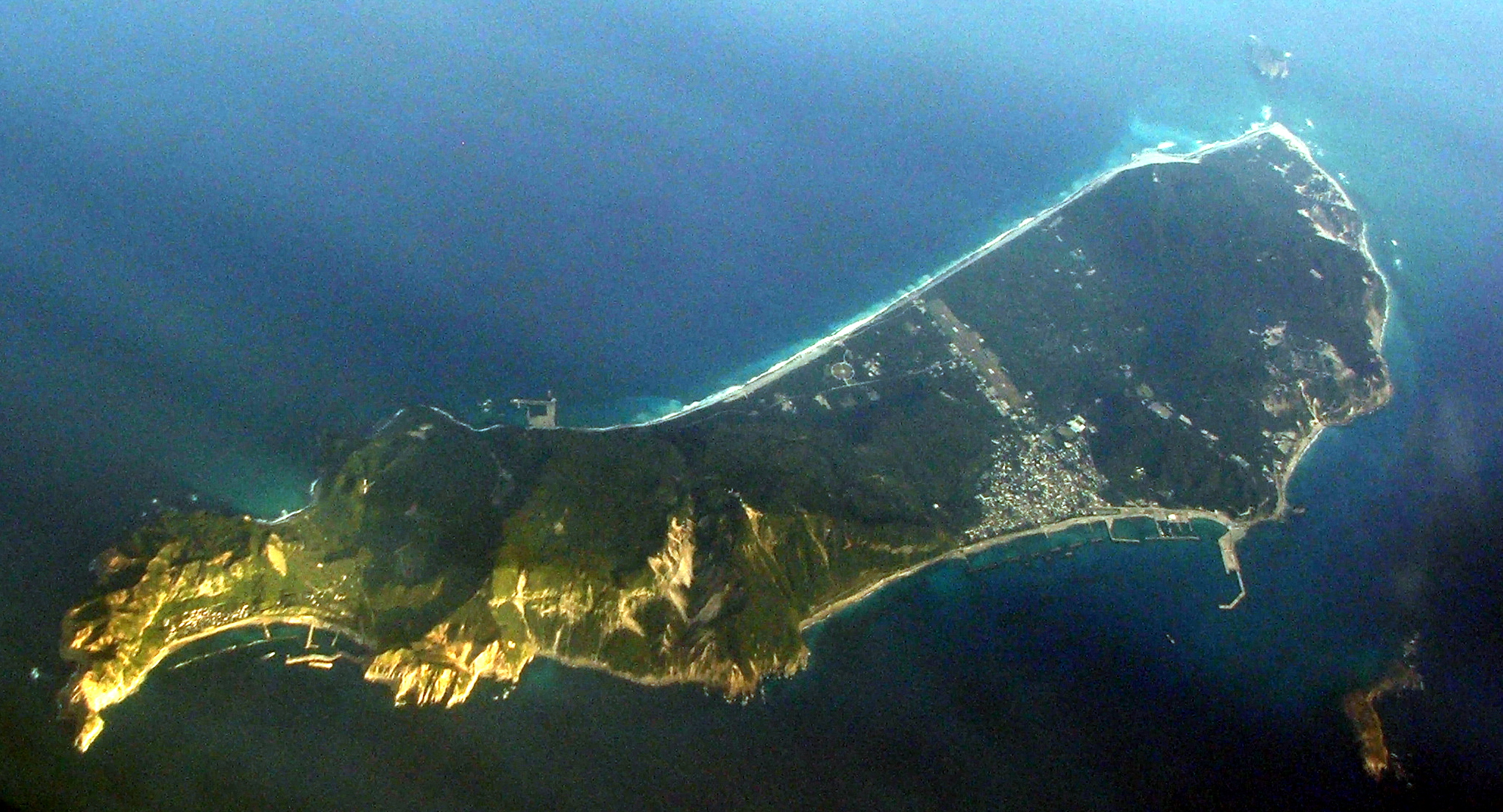
Aerial photo of Nii-jima

== Public transport ==
The only transportation service on the island is by bus, which is free. The bus route name is ふれあいバス - Fureai Bus which is operated by the Ni-jima Municipal government.

== List of regions ==
- 1 Chome
- 2 Chome
- 3 Chome
- 4 Chome
- 5 Chome
- 6 Chome
- Atsuchiyama
- Daisanyama
- Genkaku
- Hatashiro
- Higashisoto
- Hinokiyama
- Ichmaibata
- Ilmori
- Kawara
- Michishita
- Mikonohana
- Miyatsukayama
- Mukaiyama
- Namure
- Narusawa
- Obasho
- Ogiyama
- Ohara
- Omori
- Setoyama
- Shinbara
- Shirasawa
- Sobri
- Sotobasho
- Wakago
- Yamatsuyamakawa

== See also ==
- Izu Islands
- List of islands of Japan
- List of volcanoes in Japan
