= Niijima, Tokyo =

Niijima 新島村
- Village
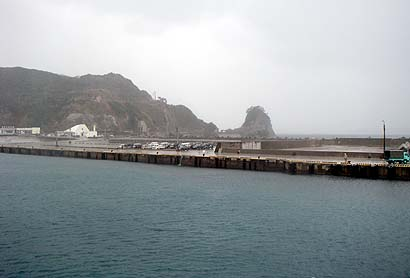
- Port of Niijima

- Flag Seal

- Location of Niijima in Tokyo Metropolis

- Coordinates: 34°22′37.4″N 139°15′24.3″E
- Country: Japan
- Region: Kantō
- Prefecture: Tokyo Metropolis

Area
  - Total: 27.54 km^{2} (10.63 sq mi)

Population (October 1, 2020)
  - Total: 2,441
  - Density: 88.6/km^{2} (229/sq mi)
- Time zone: UTC+9 (Japan Standard Time)
- Phone number: 04992-5-0240
- Address: 1-1-1, Honson, Niijima-mura, Tōkyō-to 100-0402
- Climate: Cfa
- Website: www.niijima.com

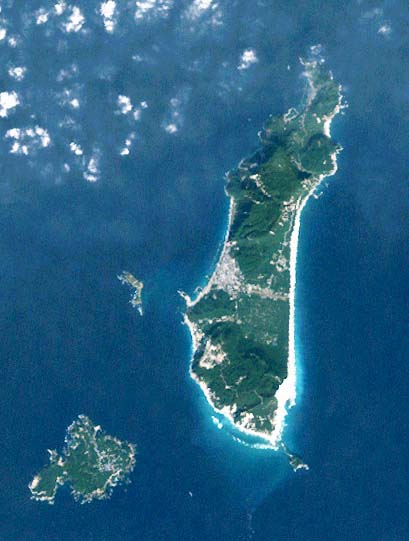
Landsat view of Niijima (right) and Shikinejima (left)

Niijima (新島村, Niijima-mura) is a village located in Ōshima Subprefecture, Tokyo Metropolis, Japan. As of 1 October 2020, the village had an estimated population of 2,441, and a population density of 88.6 persons per km^{2}. Its total area is 27.54 square kilometres (10.63 sq mi).

== Geography ==
The village of Niijima consists of the inhabited islands of Nii-jima and Shikinejima, the uninhabited islands of Udoneshima and Jinai-tō, and numerous small rocks in the northern Izu archipelago.

=== Surrounding municipalities ===
- Tokyo Metropolis
  - Toshima, Tokyo
  - Kōzushima, Tokyo

=== Climate ===
Climate data for Nii-jima (2003−2020 normals, extremes 1976−present)
Month	Jan	Feb	Mar	Apr	May	Jun	Jul	Aug	Sep	Oct	Nov	Dec	Year
Record high °C (°F)	20.0 (68.0)	20.5 (68.9)	22.2 (72.0)	25.0 (77.0)	27.7 (81.9)	31.0 (87.8)	34.2 (93.6)	34.1 (93.4)	33.0 (91.4)	30.5 (86.9)	27.2 (81.0)	24.2 (75.6)	34.2 (93.6)
Mean daily maximum °C (°F)	11.5 (52.7)	12.2 (54.0)	14.8 (58.6)	18.5 (65.3)	22.0 (71.6)	24.3 (75.7)	27.9 (82.2)	29.6 (85.3)	27.1 (80.8)	22.7 (72.9)	18.8 (65.8)	14.1 (57.4)	20.3 (68.5)
Daily mean °C (°F)	8.9 (48.0)	9.5 (49.1)	11.8 (53.2)	15.5 (59.9)	19.1 (66.4)	21.8 (71.2)	25.3 (77.5)	26.8 (80.2)	24.5 (76.1)	20.4 (68.7)	16.3 (61.3)	11.6 (52.9)	17.6 (63.7)
Mean daily minimum °C (°F)	5.5 (41.9)	6.1 (43.0)	8.2 (46.8)	12.0 (53.6)	15.9 (60.6)	19.4 (66.9)	23.1 (73.6)	24.6 (76.3)	22.1 (71.8)	17.7 (63.9)	13.1 (55.6)	8.3 (46.9)	14.7 (58.4)
Record low °C (°F)	−2.8 (27.0)	−3.7 (25.3)	−2.0 (28.4)	1.4 (34.5)	6.0 (42.8)	12.2 (54.0)	16.1 (61.0)	18.7 (65.7)	14.1 (57.4)	6.9 (44.4)	1.9 (35.4)	−2.1 (28.2)	−3.7 (25.3)
Average precipitation mm (inches)	101.4 (3.99)	134.3 (5.29)	187.0 (7.36)	173.4 (6.83)	184.0 (7.24)	261.5 (10.30)	205.3 (8.08)	169.1 (6.66)	195.1 (7.68)	313.5 (12.34)	182.8 (7.20)	117.5 (4.63)	2,225 (87.60)
Average precipitation days (≥ 1.0 mm)	8.3	9.6	12.0	10.7	10.0	12.2	9.8	8.2	11.6	11.8	11.2	9.1	124.5
Source: JMA

== Demographics ==
Per Japanese census data, the population of Niijima has consistently declined at least in since 1980.

Historical population
Year	Pop.	±%
1980	3,684	—
1990	3,505	−4.9%
2000	3,161	−9.8%
2010	2,883	−8.8%
2020	2,441	−15.3%

== History ==
On October 1, 1923, the islands of Niijima and Shikinejima were organized into municipalities. Niijima was administered as Niijimahon (新島本村, Niijima-honson; lit. "Niijima Main Village"). Shikenejima was administered as Wakagō (若郷村, Wakagō-mura). Both villages belonged to Ōshima Island Government Office. In 1926, the Ōshima Island Government Office became Ōshima Subprefecture of Tokyo. On November 1, 1954, Niijimahon absorbed the village of Wakagō, and changed its name to Niijima Village on April 1, 1992.

== Economy ==
The economy of the village is dependent on commercial fishing and seasonal tourism. The village is known for its sports fishing, hot spring resorts and local beer.

== Transportation ==
Airports

- Niijima Airport at Niijima

Airlines

- New Central Airlines operates the route between Niijima and Chōfu Airport 4 laps a day. A one-way trip takes 40 minutes.

Roads

- National highways: None
- Metropolitan highways:
  - 211 Wakagō Niijima-kō Line
  - 237 Shikinejima Circle Line

Ports

- Niijima: Port of Niijima
- Shikinejima: Port of Nobushi, Fishing Port of Nobushi, Port of Shikinejima, Fishing Port of Ashitsuki, Fishing Port of Kobama

Sea routes

- Between Niijima and Nobushi
- Camellia-maru by Tōkai Kisen links between Tokyo, Yokohama (on Friday and Saturday), Izu Ōshima, Toshima, and Niijima.
- Jinshin Kisen links between Shimoda, Toshima, Niijima, Shikinejima, Kōzushima, and Shimoda. A ship runs this direction on Sunday, Tuesday, and Friday. It goes backwards on Monday, Thursday, and Saturday.
- Nishiki 2 by Niijima Village links between Niijima and Shikinejima 3 laps a day.
- Cargo ships by Niijima Bussan and Izu Shichitō Kaiun links between the islands and mainland Tokyo.

== Education ==
High schools

- Tokyo Metropolitan Niijima High School (operated by the Tokyo Metropolitan Board of Education)

Junior High Schools

- Niijima Junior High School (新島中学校)
- Shikinejima Junior High School (式根島中学校)

Elementary Schools

- Niijima Elementary School (新島小学校)
- Shikinejima Elementary School (式根島小学校)
