= Takashima, Shimane =

Takashima Island
Native name: 高島 Takashima
- Location within Japan

Geography
- Location: Sea of Japan
- Coordinates: 34°50′6″N 131°50′19″E
- Area: 0.39 km^{2} (0.15 sq mi)
- Length: 1.1 km (0.68 mi)
- Width: 0.2 km (0.12 mi)
- Coastline: 4 km (2.5 mi)
- Highest elevation: 117 m (384 ft)

Administration
- Japan
- Prefecture: Shimane Prefecture
- City: Masuda

Demographics
- Population: 0

Takashima (高島, Taka-shima) is a volcanic island in the Sea of Japan, 12 km from the coast of the Shimane prefecture in Japan. Takashima Island is administered as part of Masuda, Shimane Prefecture. Takashima takes its name, meaning "High Island" from its steep cliffs and mountains. The island was inhabited since at least 15th century, but was completely depopulated twice - in 1711 and 1975, when all inhabitants left the island following natural disasters. Currently (as in 2017) it is used as a fishing spot.

Since 1966, the island has a navigation beacon visible 11.5 nmi (21.3 km) away.

== See also ==
- This article incorporates material from Japanese Wikipedia page 高島 (島根県), accessed 5 January 2017
- Uninhabited island
- Lists of islands
