= Kamikoshiki-shima =

Island in Kagoshima, Japan

Kamikoshiki Island
Native name: 上甑島 Kamikoshiki-shima
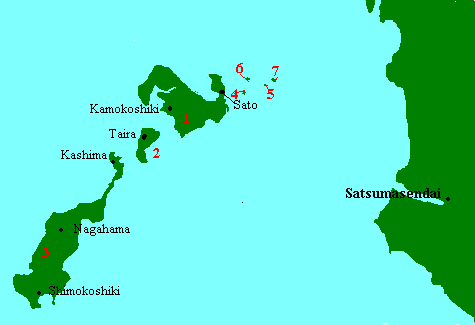
- Kamikoshiki-shima is marked as (1)

- Location within Japan

Geography
- Location: East China Sea
- Coordinates: 31.835°N 129.889°E
- Area: 45.08 km^{2} (17.41 sq mi)
- Length: 11 km (6.8 mi)
- Width: 4 km (2.5 mi)
- Highest elevation: 423 m (1388 ft)
- Highest point: Tomekiyama

Administration
- Japan
- Prefecture: Kagoshima Prefecture
- city: Satsumasendai

Demographics
- Population: 2488 (2010)
- Pop. density: 55/km^{2} (142/sq mi)
- Ethnic groups: Japanese

Kamikoshiki Island (上甑島, Kamikoshiki-shima) is the second largest island in the Koshikijima Islands. Its coasts are washed by East China Sea. The island's highest peak is Mount Tomekiyama 423 m (1,388 ft) high.

== Settlements and administrative units ==
- Sato village
- Kamikoshiki, Kagoshima
  - Kamikoshiki-Chō Nakakoshiki
  - Kamikoshiki-Chō Nakano
  - Kamikoshiki-Chō Eishi
  - Kamikoshiki-Chō Oshima
  - Kamikoshiki-Chō Segami
  - Kamikoshiki-Chō Kawanoura
  - Kamikoshiki-Chō Taira

== Geography ==
The island's topography features mountains rising directly from the sea, along with small coastal plains. The terrain is rugged, although not to the same degree as on nearby Shimokoshiki-shima. The north-eastern coast features a 5-km long sandspit enclosing three shallow lagoons. The population is concentrated in the extreme east of island in Sato village, placed on a low sandspit 1400 by 250 metres large, the village is the largest settlement ever built on a sandspit in Japan.

== History ==
The island has been inhabited from the Jōmon period and has important archaeological sites. It was inhabited by Satsuma Hayato people during the Nara period. The first Japanese fortifications on the island were built during the Jōkyū War in 1221. The island was belonged to settled Christians during the Nanboku trade period and islanders participated in the Shimabara rebellion of 1638. The Kamikoshiki-shima has suffered from the same string of epidemics, famine and typhoon-related damage as nearby Shimokoshiki-shima in 19th and 20th centuries, resulting in significant emigration and population decline which peaked at 11166 men in 1950.

== Transportation ==
Kamikoshiki-shima is connected to Nakakoshiki-shima and Shimokoshiki-shima by a bridge and two connecting tunnels, which were completed on 29 August 2020 after more than 9 years of construction. Ferry lines connect Kamikoshiki-shima to Shimokoshiki-shima and Ichikikushikino, a city on the Kyushu mainland. The ferry offers two daily round-trip routes.

Inland, transportation is provided by public buses operating along four routes.

== See also ==
- Shimokoshiki-shima
- Koshikishima Islands
