= Koshikishima Islands =

East China Sea islands

Native name: 甑島列島 Koshikishima Rettō
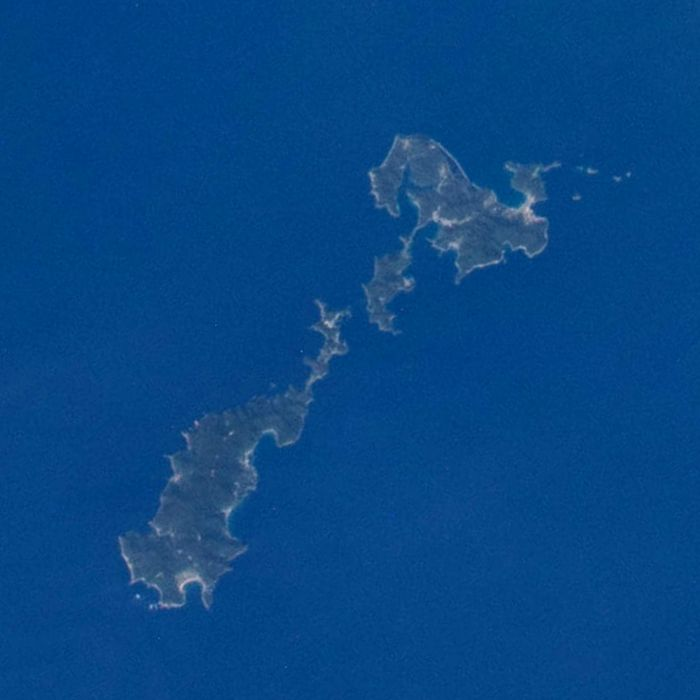

- Location within Japan

Geography
- Location: East China Sea
- Coordinates: 31.75328°N 129.78424°E
- Archipelago: yes
- Total islands: 11
- Major islands: 3
- Area: 118.68 km^{2} (45.82 sq mi)
- Length: 39 km (24.2 mi)
- Width: 11 km (6.8 mi)

Administration
- Japan
- Prefecture: Kagoshima Prefecture
- City: Satsumasendai

Demographics
- Population: 5576 (2010)
- Pop. density: 47/km^{2} (122/sq mi)
- Ethnic groups: Japanese

The Koshikishima Islands (甑島列島, Koshikishima-rettō) in the East China Sea are an island chain located 38 kilometres (21 nmi; 24 mi) west of the port city of Ichikikushikino, Kagoshima.

== Major islands ==
Island	Coordinates	area, km²	population (2010)
Kamikoshiki-shima (上甑島)	31.834790°N 129.888989°E	45.08	2488
Naka-Koshiki-shima (中甑島)	31.802107°N 129.827191°E	7.29	308
Shimokoshiki-shima (下甑島)	31.704047°N 129.723703°E	66.27	2780

== Minor islands ==
All minor islands are currently (as of 2017) uninhabited.

Island	Coordinates	area, km²
No-jima (野島)	31.866071°N 129.960427°E	0.11
Chika-jima (近島)	31.851494°N 129.950236°E	0.10
Futago-jima (双子島)	31.862180°N 129.976023°E	0.05
Okinoshima (沖の島)	31.864498°N 129.984074°E	0.02
Benkei-jima (弁慶島)#	31.773680°N 129.834574°E	0.02
Kasetō (筒島)	31.866938°N 129.953346°E	0.02
Napoleon Rock	31.703060°N 129.687216°E	0.01
Yurashima (由良島)	31.743005°N 129.755239°E	0.01
Matsushima (松島)	31.866748°N 129.948315°E	0.004

1. seems to undergo significant erosion and may disappear

== History ==
The islands once consisted of 14 villages, belonging to Shikijima-gun, Satsuma Province (Satsuma no Kuni) during the Meiji period. In 1889, the islands were consolidated into Kami-Koshiki and Shimo-Koshiki villages. In 1897, the islands were merged with Satsuma-gun. Later, Kashima village and Sato village broke off, for a total of four villages. In 2004, during "the great Heisei merger", the villages were merged with the city of Sendai, on the coast of Kyushu.

== Important Bird Area ==
The islands have been recognised as an Important Bird Area (IBA) by BirdLife International because they support populations of Japanese wood pigeons and Pleske's grasshopper warblers.

== Attractions ==
The cruise course visiting many scenic coastal rocks and islets is available from Shimo-Koshiki island.
