= Jack Moyer =

American marine biologist and child sexual abuser

Jack Thomson Moyer
- ジャック・モイヤー
- Born: March 7, 1929; Kansas, United States
- Died: January 10, 2004 (aged 74); Tokyo, Japan
- Education: University of Michigan
- Scientific career
- Fields: Marine biology

Jack Thomson Moyer (March 7, 1929 – January 10, 2004) was a marine biologist and known child sexual abuser from Kansas, who lived for most of his life on Miyake-jima in Japan. Moyer was a scientist with the United States Air Force, who became a teacher later in life for the American School in Japan (ASIJ). He committed suicide in 2004. After his death, multiple allegations surfaced that Moyer had sexually molested students during his tenure at the ASIJ.

== Life and career ==
Jack Moyer was born on 7 March 1929, in Kansas, United States.

He made his first visit to Japan in 1951 with the United States Air Force, and made his first trip to Miyake-jima the following year. During his time in Japan, Moyer saw that the Air Force was using Onoharajima as a practice bombing range. Moyer wrote a letter to an associate of President Harry S. Truman to stop the bombing in order to save a rare seabird, the Japanese murrelet, that breeds on Onoharajima. The bombing was stopped. Moyer later moved to Miyake-jima in 1957 after graduating from Colgate University, and became a part of the island community for over 50 years.

Moyer received a master's from the University of Michigan and attained his doctorate in marine ecology from the University of Tokyo. Moyer was an ornithologist, marine biologist and naturalist who focused on the islands of the Izu archipelago and promoted the need for preservation of the islands' unique ecology. Having spent many years on Miyake-jima, he was aware of the changes that came with modernization. Construction of public roads and harbors claimed increasing amounts of previously untouched mountain forest areas of the islands, and increasing car traffic and sea pollution were important concerns of his as well. During his time on Miyake-jima, Moyer organized a summer school for local children. In 1996, he was awarded the Asahi Shimbun prize for his work on ocean ecology and the education of young children.

Later in life, Moyer split his time between Miyake-jima and Tokyo, where he taught a course entitled "Japan Lands And People" (JLAP) at the American School in Japan (ASIJ). Moyer was an extremely popular teacher at the school. A highlight of the JLAP course was the annual week-long trip to Miyake-jima for the 7th grade ASIJ class, where they would stay in Moyer's modest island home while studying local fisheries and farming.

Moyer wrote several articles for the Japan Times on the marine biology of Japan. He was the author of several books, including Dolphin interpreter Introduction ISBN 4861640032 and Man of the sea and the birds ISBN 4886221092.

Along with the other residents of the island, Moyer was forced to flee the island following the eruptions of Mount Oyama in 2000. Later, he was asked by the Tokyo Metropolitan government to survey the island. He concluded that the island's ecology was recovering.

== Death ==
Moyer committed suicide at age 74 in his Tokyo home in 2004. Moyer left behind two suicide notes, and his body was discovered among a batch of unidentified sleeping pills.

== Scandal ==
In March 2014, The American School in Japan admitted that several alumni had been sexually abused as middle school students by Moyer, while he was a teacher at the school. As many as 32 girls were victimized by Moyer, starting as early as 1964. In 2014, a legal firm representing 10 women who had allegedly been victims of Moyer's sent a demand letter to the ASIJ, claiming the school had been told repeatedly about Moyer's actions, but did nothing.

In June 2015, the ASIJ Board of Directors released a letter admitting that an independent investigation found that Jack Moyer's abuse of students was extensive and that the abuse was covered up by faculty and administrators for years. The board apologized for the harm this has caused and promised to release the report in English and Japanese by mid-June, 2015. The full report, released by Ropes & Gray LLP on June 15, 2015, concluded "[i]n light of all of the evidence we have examined, it is apparent to us that Moyer was a serial pedophile who, in our assessment, sexually abused female ASIJ students". Lawyers for 13 of the victims also released their report on June 15, 2015.

== Taxon named after Moyer ==
- Synchiropus moyeri, the Moyer's dragonet, is a species of fish in the family Callionymidae, the dragonets. It is found in the Western Pacific.
