= Miyake-jima =

Volcanic island in the Izu island archipelago

Miyakejima
Native name: 三宅島
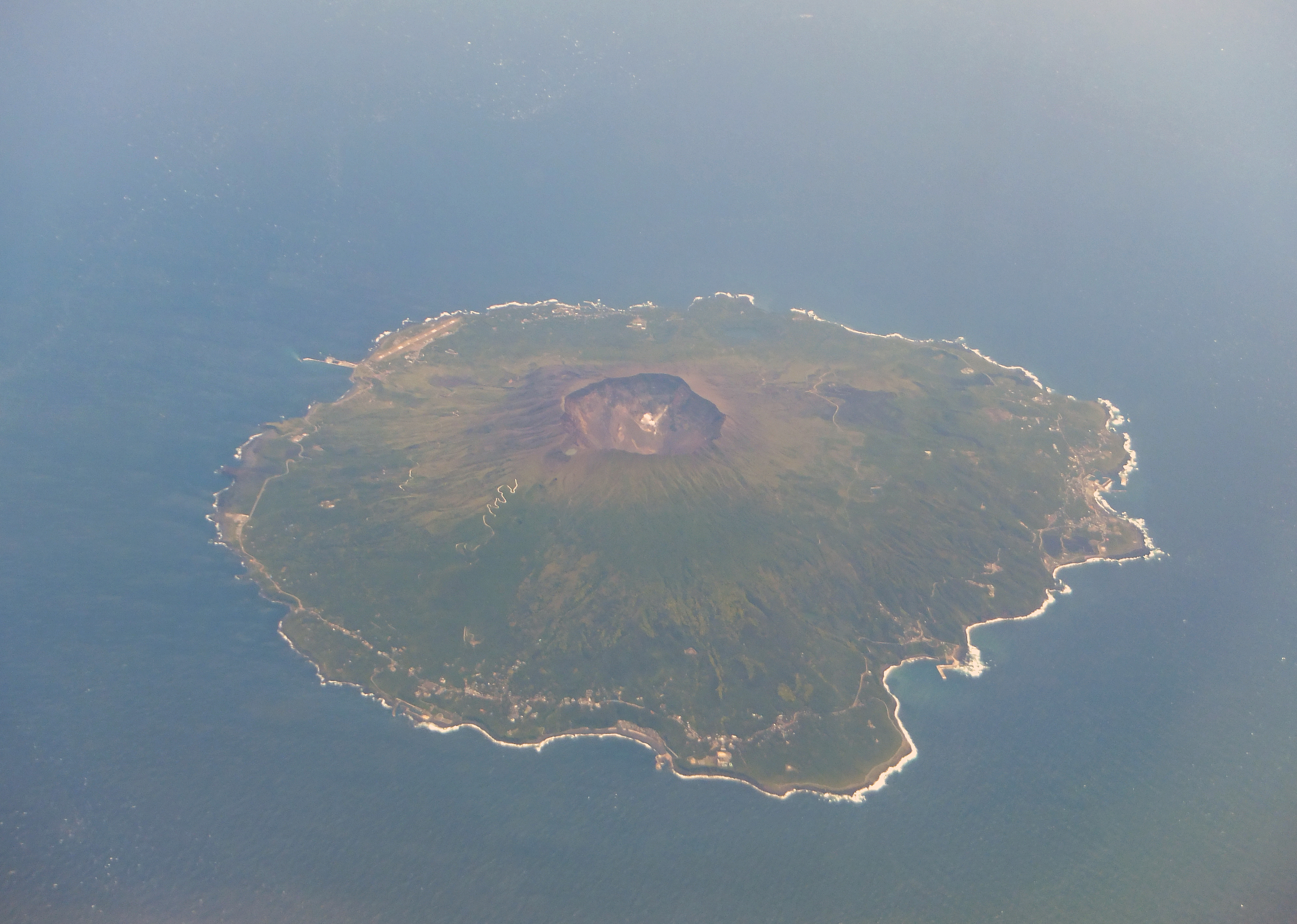
- Interactive map of Miyakejima

Geography
- Location: Philippine Sea
- Coordinates: 34.079°N 139.529°E
- Archipelago: Izu Islands
- Area: 55.44 km^{2} (21.41 sq mi)
- Coastline: 38.3 km (23.8 mi)
- Highest elevation: 775.1 m (2543 ft)
- Highest point: Oyama

Administration
- Japan
- Prefecture: Tokyo
- Subprefecture: Miyake Subprefecture
- Village: Miyake

Demographics
- Population: 2,460 (2019)
- Pop. density: 44.37/km^{2} (114.92/sq mi)
- Ethnic groups: Japanese

Additional information

Miyake-jima (三宅島; "Miyake Island") is a volcanic island in the Izu archipelago in the Philippine Sea approximately 180 kilometers (110 mi) southeast of Tokyo, Japan. As with the other islands in the Izu Island group, Miyake-jima forms part of the Fuji-Hakone-Izu National Park.

== Etymology ==
There are many theories about the origin of Miyake-jima's name. One theory claims a manuscript about the island's genesis called the Miyakeki (三宅記), written by a Shinto priest from the island, influenced the name. The manuscript explains how a deity, Mashima (三嶋), constructed his palace on the island after having built two other houses on neighbouring islands. Each of the houses had their backs facing the palace, thus giving a lined up impression. This belief is known as the 'three-house theory'. Another hypothesis says that the shrines on Miyake-jima are historically related to those on Miyajima, an island in Hiroshima Bay. As there are many more speculations, the true origin cannot be known.

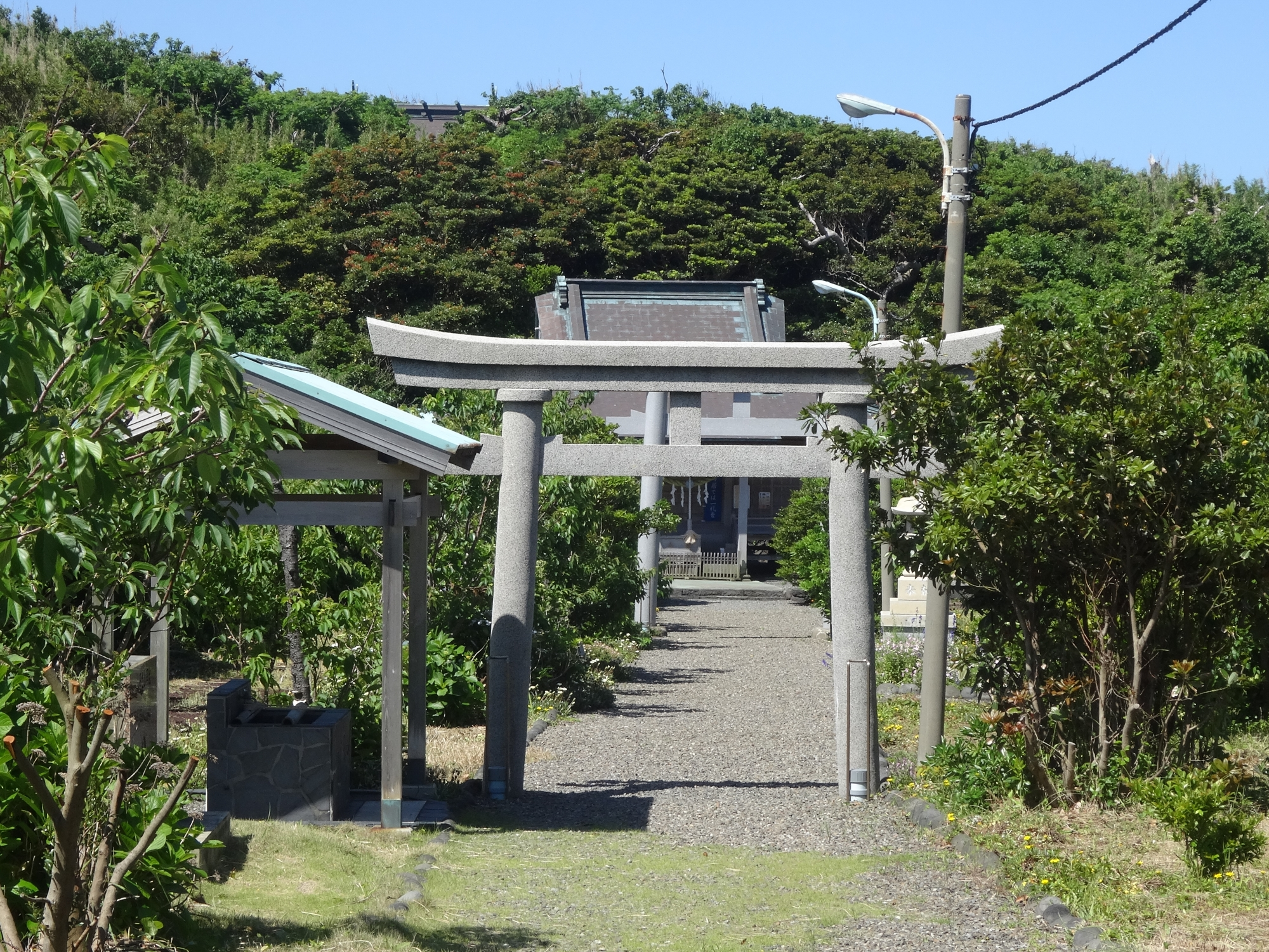
Toga Shrine in west Miyake, possible birthplace of the mythical Mashima

== Geography ==
The island is a stratovolcano with a granitic composite cone, dating from the late Pleistocene period, between 10,000 and 2,000 years ago. The island has a roughly circular coastline, 38.3 kilometers in length, with an average diameter of eight kilometers. The highest elevation Mount Oyama (雄山, Oyama-san) is an active volcano with a height of 759 meters. The mountain has been recorded to have erupted numerous times throughout history, and is mentioned as far back as Nara period written records. Over the past 890 years, it has erupted 13 times, including five times since the start of the Meiji period. A lava flow in 1940 killed 11 people, and other eruptions occurred in 1962 and 1983.

On July 14, 2000, Mount Oyama began another series of eruptions, and by September, the island was completely evacuated. After a four-year period of volcanic emissions, residents were allowed to return permanently on February 1, 2005. After the eruption, there has been a constant flow of sulfur dioxide gas coming from Mount Oyama. Residents of the island were once required to carry gas masks with them at all times. However, masks have not been needed for years. Alarms go off if there is a dramatic increase in the levels of toxic gases in the air. Volcanic gas emissions from this volcano are measured by a Multi-Component Gas Analyzer System, which detects pre-eruptive degassing of rising magmas, improving prediction of volcanic activity.

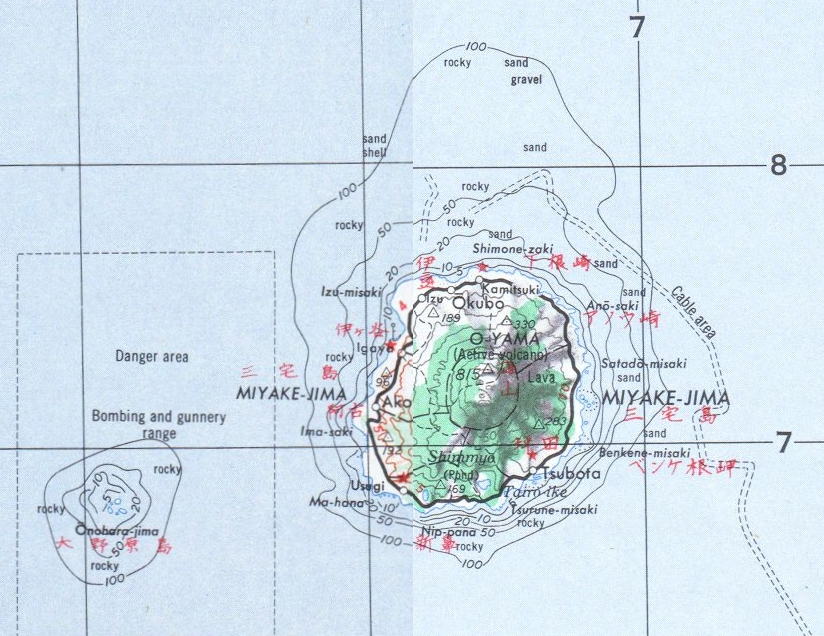
Map of Miyake-jima,
with Ōnoharajima west south-west of it

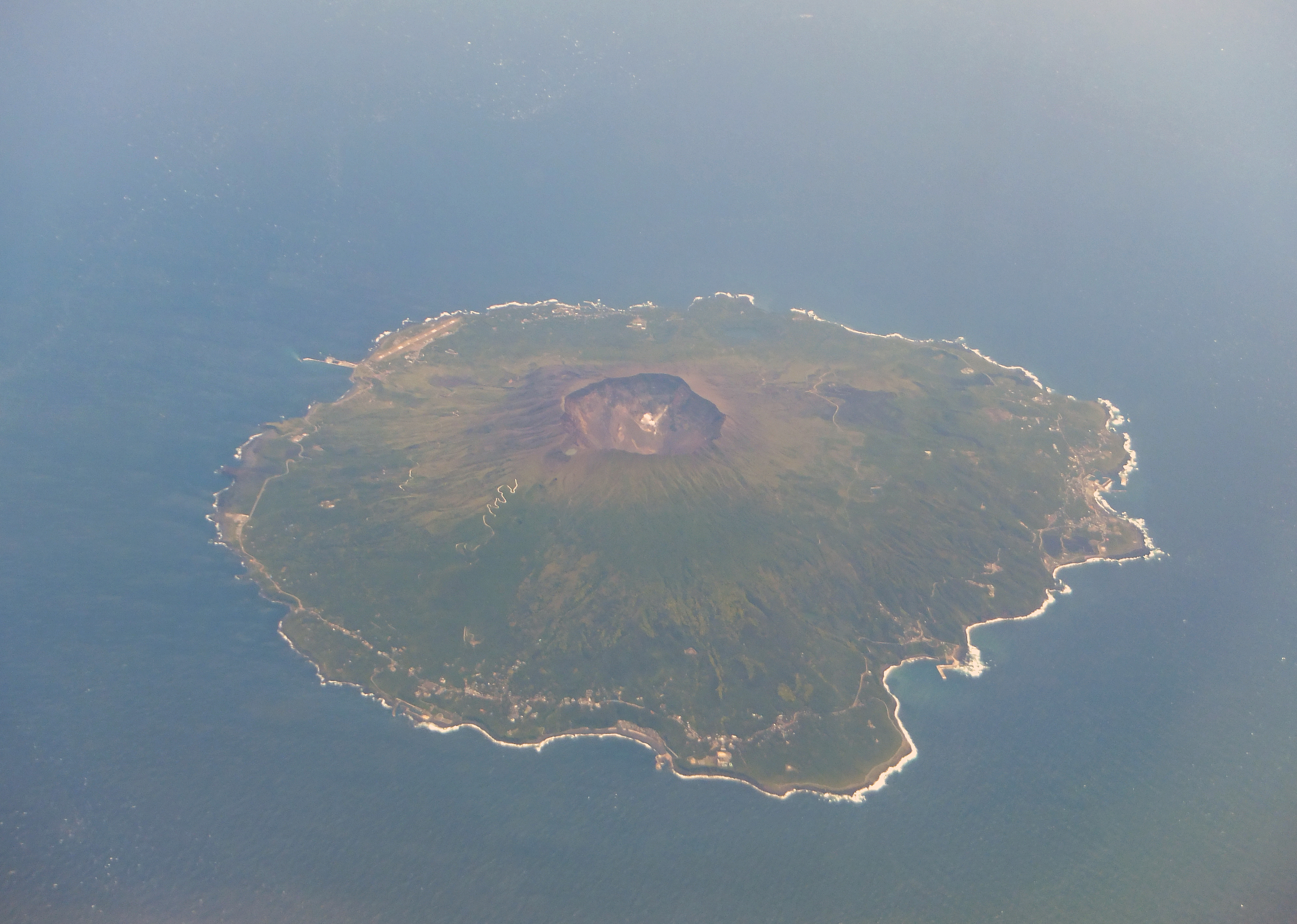
View from Airplane

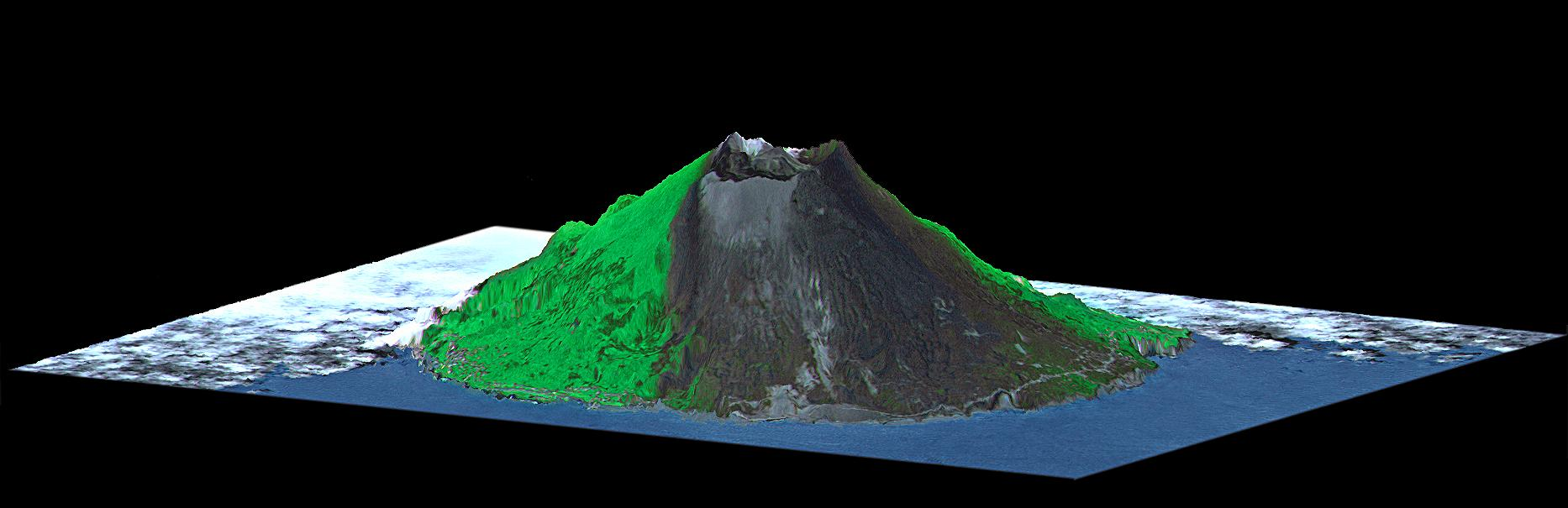
Perspective of Miyake-Jima Island

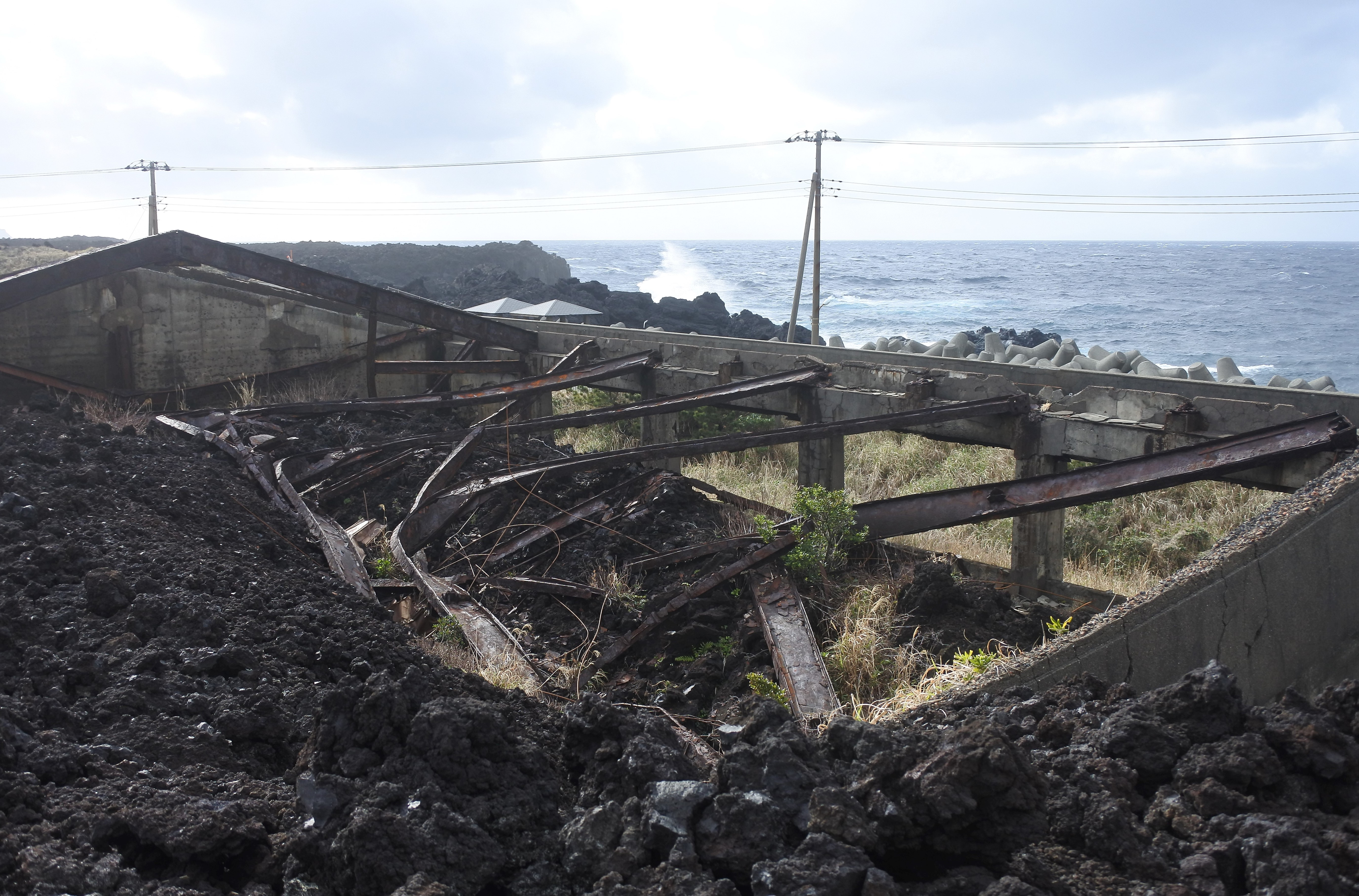
Ruin of a school gym engulfed in a lava flow of 1983

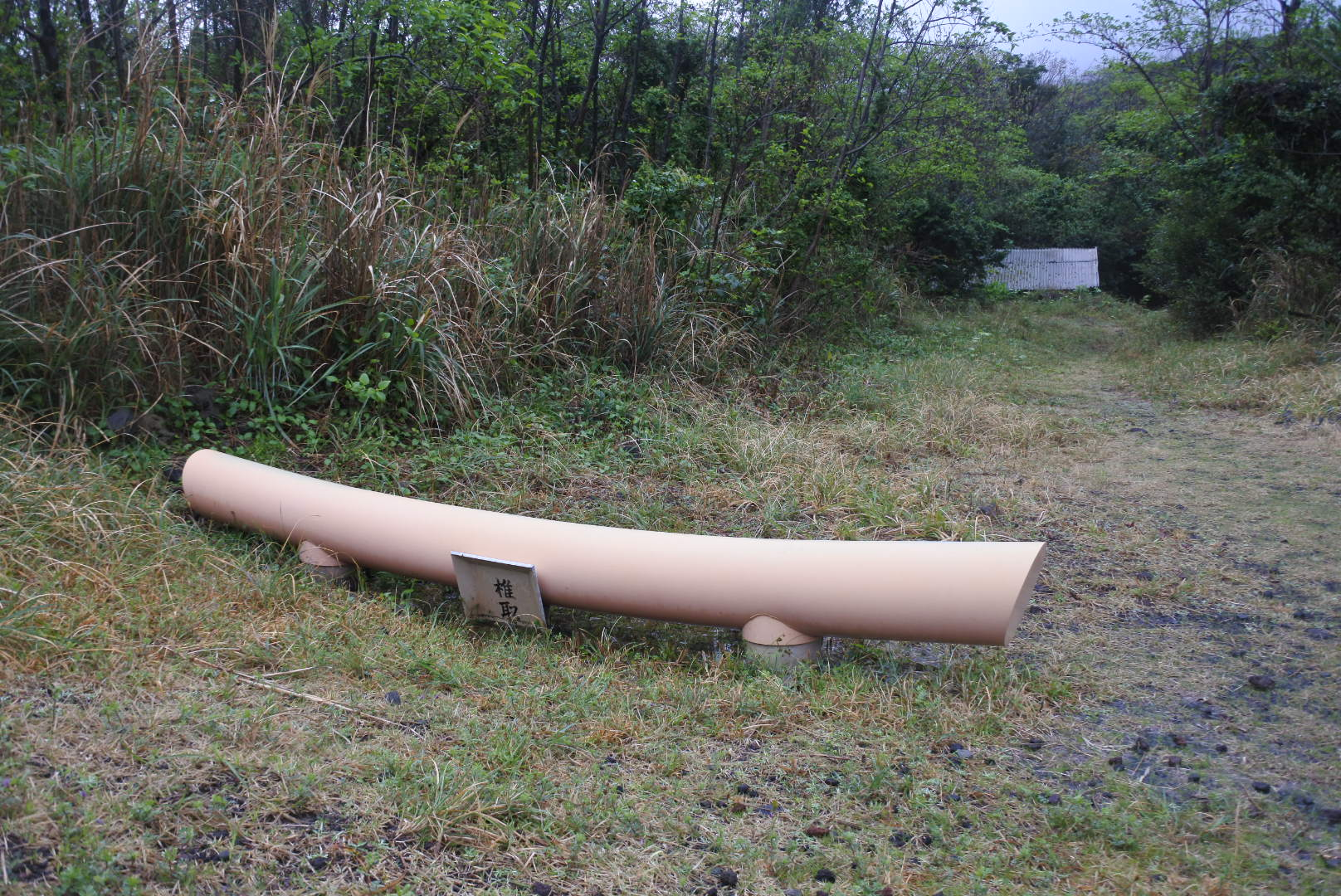
Torii of Shiitori Shrine in the mudflow of 2000 eruption

== Climate ==
Miyake-jima has a humid subtropical climate (Köppen climate classification Cfa) with very warm summers and mild winters. Precipitation is abundant throughout the year, but is somewhat lower in winter.

Climate data for Miyake-jima (1991−2020 normals, extremes 1942−present)
Month	Jan	Feb	Mar	Apr	May	Jun	Jul	Aug	Sep	Oct	Nov	Dec	Year
Record high °C (°F)	20.1 (68.2)	21.8 (71.2)	23.5 (74.3)	24.9 (76.8)	28.1 (82.6)	31.1 (88.0)	33.1 (91.6)	32.8 (91.0)	32.3 (90.1)	29.9 (85.8)	26.4 (79.5)	23.8 (74.8)	33.1 (91.6)
Mean maximum °C (°F)	17.5 (63.5)	18.3 (64.9)	20.3 (68.5)	22.9 (73.2)	25.6 (78.1)	28.0 (82.4)	30.8 (87.4)	31.5 (88.7)	30.4 (86.7)	27.2 (81.0)	23.4 (74.1)	20.3 (68.5)	31.6 (88.9)
Mean daily maximum °C (°F)	12.1 (53.8)	12.4 (54.3)	15.0 (59.0)	18.6 (65.5)	21.9 (71.4)	24.2 (75.6)	27.8 (82.0)	29.1 (84.4)	26.7 (80.1)	22.9 (73.2)	19.0 (66.2)	14.6 (58.3)	20.4 (68.7)
Daily mean °C (°F)	9.9 (49.8)	10.0 (50.0)	12.3 (54.1)	15.8 (60.4)	19.2 (66.6)	21.8 (71.2)	25.3 (77.5)	26.6 (79.9)	24.5 (76.1)	20.8 (69.4)	16.8 (62.2)	12.5 (54.5)	18.0 (64.3)
Mean daily minimum °C (°F)	7.1 (44.8)	6.9 (44.4)	9.2 (48.6)	12.7 (54.9)	16.2 (61.2)	19.5 (67.1)	23.2 (73.8)	24.3 (75.7)	22.2 (72.0)	18.4 (65.1)	14.1 (57.4)	9.7 (49.5)	15.3 (59.5)
Mean minimum °C (°F)	2.1 (35.8)	1.9 (35.4)	3.7 (38.7)	7.0 (44.6)	11.5 (52.7)	15.6 (60.1)	19.7 (67.5)	21.5 (70.7)	18.5 (65.3)	13.7 (56.7)	9.0 (48.2)	4.0 (39.2)	1.2 (34.2)
Record low °C (°F)	−1.2 (29.8)	−1.4 (29.5)	−0.2 (31.6)	2.8 (37.0)	7.4 (45.3)	12.1 (53.8)	14.8 (58.6)	18.2 (64.8)	14.1 (57.4)	8.9 (48.0)	3.7 (38.7)	0.9 (33.6)	−1.4 (29.5)
Average precipitation mm (inches)	150.9 (5.94)	170.9 (6.73)	275.6 (10.85)	229.3 (9.03)	243.3 (9.58)	349.7 (13.77)	240.2 (9.46)	206.6 (8.13)	330.9 (13.03)	418.9 (16.49)	234.2 (9.22)	171.1 (6.74)	3,024.7 (119.08)
Average precipitation days (≥ 1.0 mm)	9.2	10.1	14.1	11.5	11.3	13.6	10.2	8.9	13.5	13.8	12.0	10.7	138.9
Average relative humidity (%)	65	66	70	73	79	86	87	86	83	78	72	67	76
Mean monthly sunshine hours	114.8	117.9	133.5	166.7	181.8	126.8	182.8	221.9	136.0	103.9	107.2	108.7	1,693.3
Source: Japan Meteorological Agency

See or edit raw graph data.

== Flora and fauna ==
Miyake-jima is home to an unusually rich flora and fauna with several rare species of birds and animals, although its natural habitats are constantly under threat from human and volcanic activity. Underwater, the island is valued by divers for its coral reefs and marine fauna (including the dolphin population outside nearby Mikura-jima). The island has been recognised as an Important Bird Area (IBA) by BirdLife International because it supports populations of Japanese wood pigeons, Japanese murrelets, Pleske's grasshopper warblers, Ijima's leaf-warblers and Izu thrushes (akakokko).

== Administration ==
The island is administered by the Miyake subprefecture of the Tokyo Metropolitan government. As of June 1, 2016, the population of the island was 2451. Miyake Village (三宅村, Miyake-mura) serves as the local government of the island, and also includes nearby tiny uninhabited Ōnoharajima west south-west of Miyake-jima.

Miyake village consists of the five traditional hamlets of Izu, Kamitsuki, Igaya, Ako and Tsubota, with Tsubota on the southeast coast as the administrative center.

Flag of Miyake, Tokyo

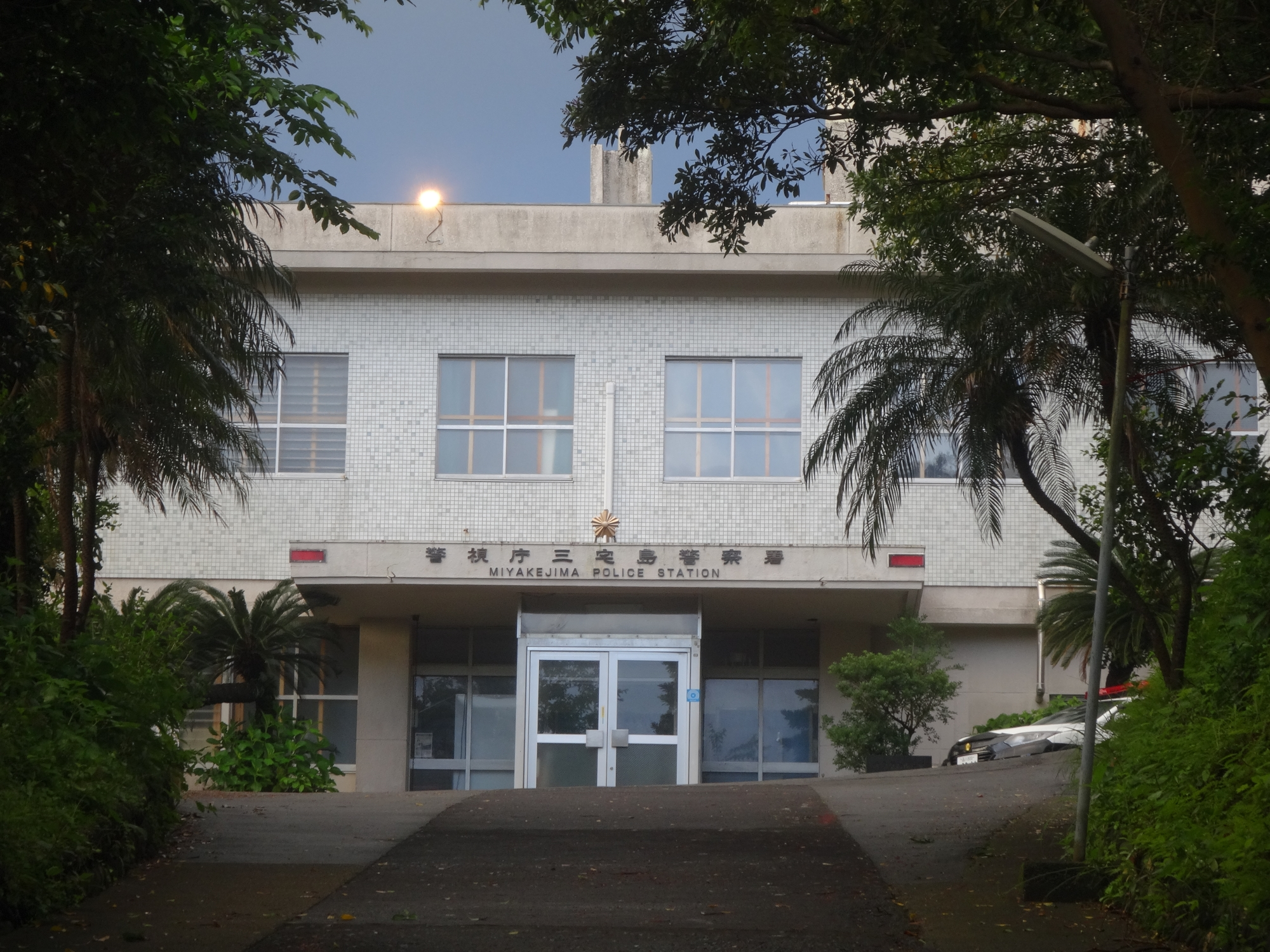
Miyakejima Police Station

== Access ==
The island is accessible by an over-night ferry called the Tachibana Maru (橘丸), which is operated by Tōkai Kisen. The ferry departs from Takeshiba Pier, near Hamamatsuchō Station, Tokyo at 22:30 and arrives at Miyakejima at 5:00. Depending on the wind and weather conditions, the Tachibana Maru will dock at one of three ports; Miike Port Pier (三池港桟橋), Igaya Port (伊ヶ谷港), or Sabigahama Port (錆ヶ浜港). The port where the boat will dock is not predictable and changes on a daily basis. Generally, the boat will arrive at a port that is complementary with the wind direction. A second large passenger ship named Salvia Maru (さるびあ丸) also started servicing Miyake-jima on June 25, 2020.

There are flights connecting Miyakejima Airport and Haneda Airport with an approximate flying time of 50 minutes. Flights are also operated from Chofu Airport. The area is prone to high volume of sulfuric gas and flights were suspended for almost eight years after the July 14, 2000 volcano eruption. Flights resumed during April 2008, after sulfuric gases in the air dropped to levels below 0.2ppm. There is a helicopter that arrives via Izu Ōshima. There are also two helicopter flights operated by Tokyo Island Shuttle which originate in Aogashima and Izu Ōshima and fly to Toshima, Miyake-jima, Mikura-jima, Hachijō-jima and Aogashima.

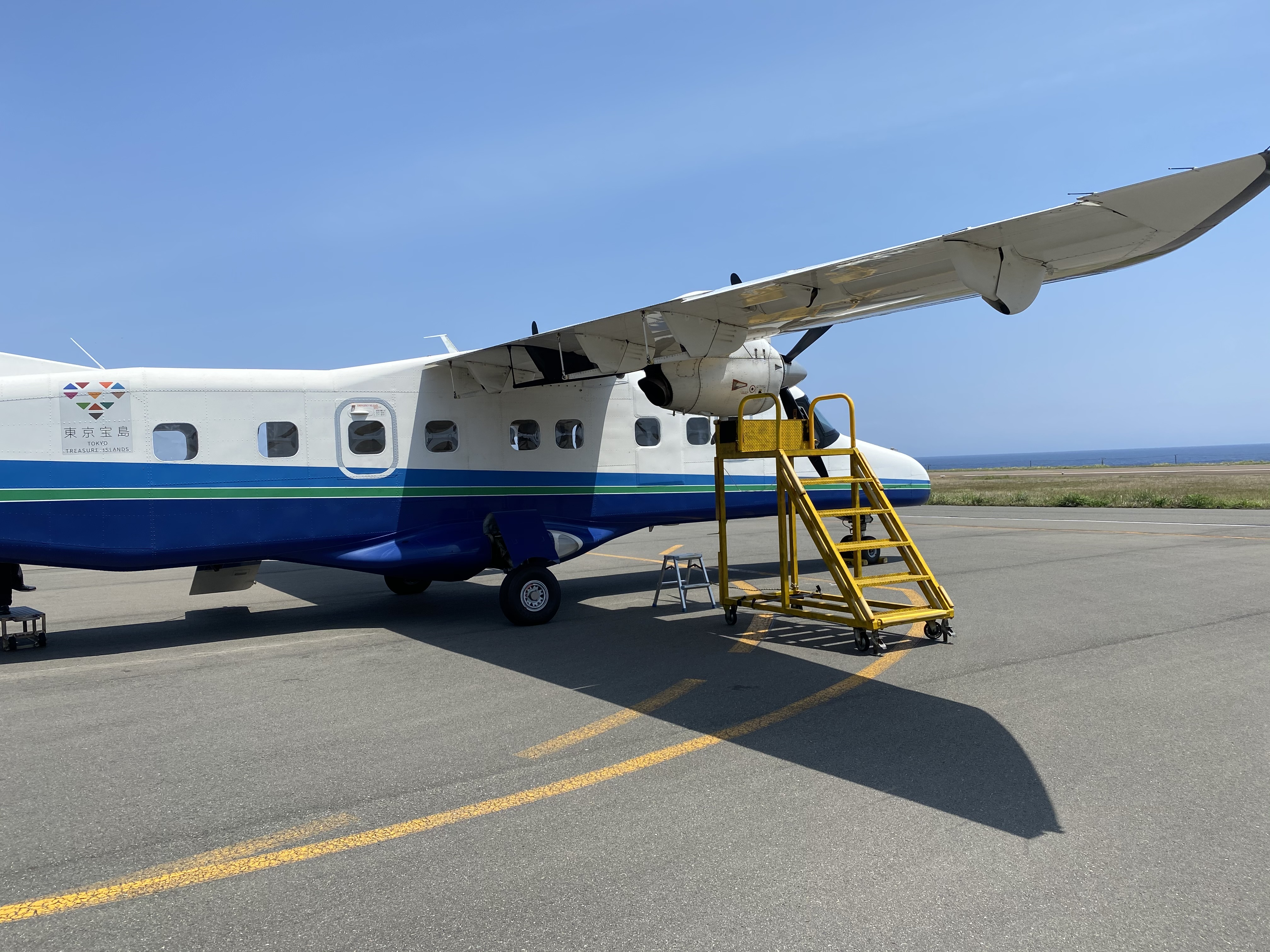
Plane at Miyake-jima Airport

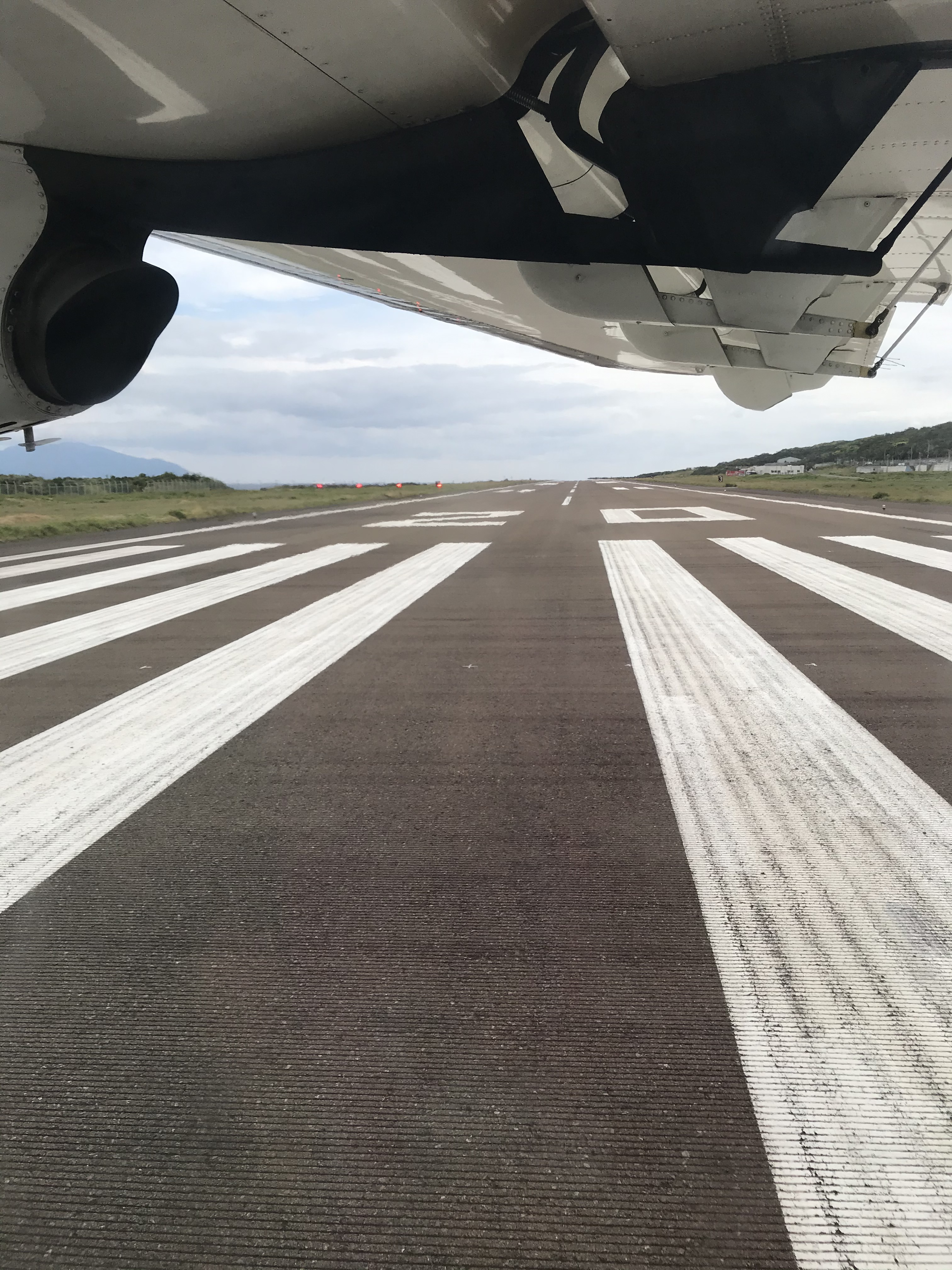
Runway with Mikura-jima in the distance.

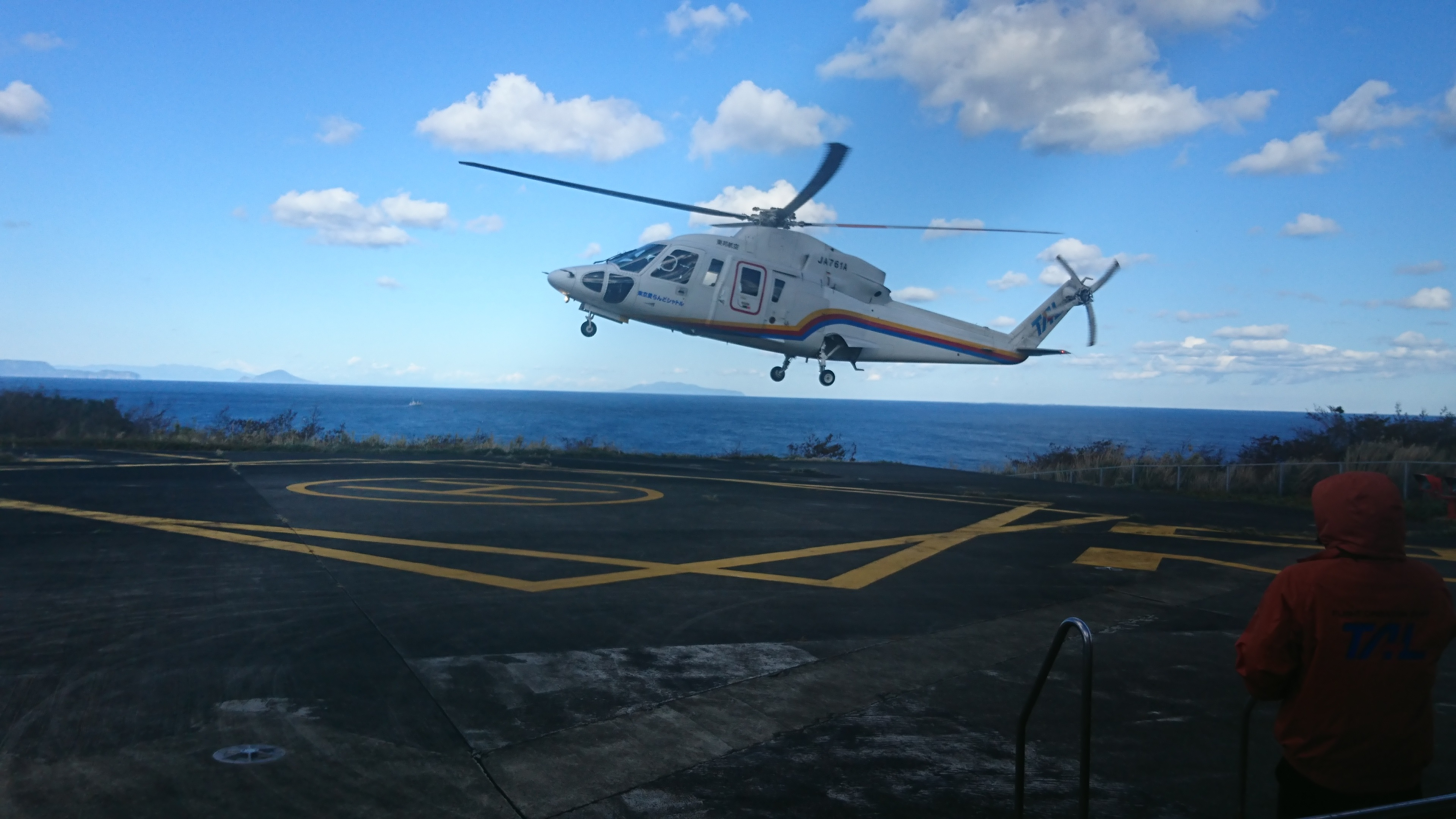
Miyakejima Helipad

There are two bus routes on the island. Both bus routes service the same stops, but one route goes clockwise and the other route goes counter-clockwise. The time between each bus stop arrival can vary greatly from a few minutes to up to 3 hours.

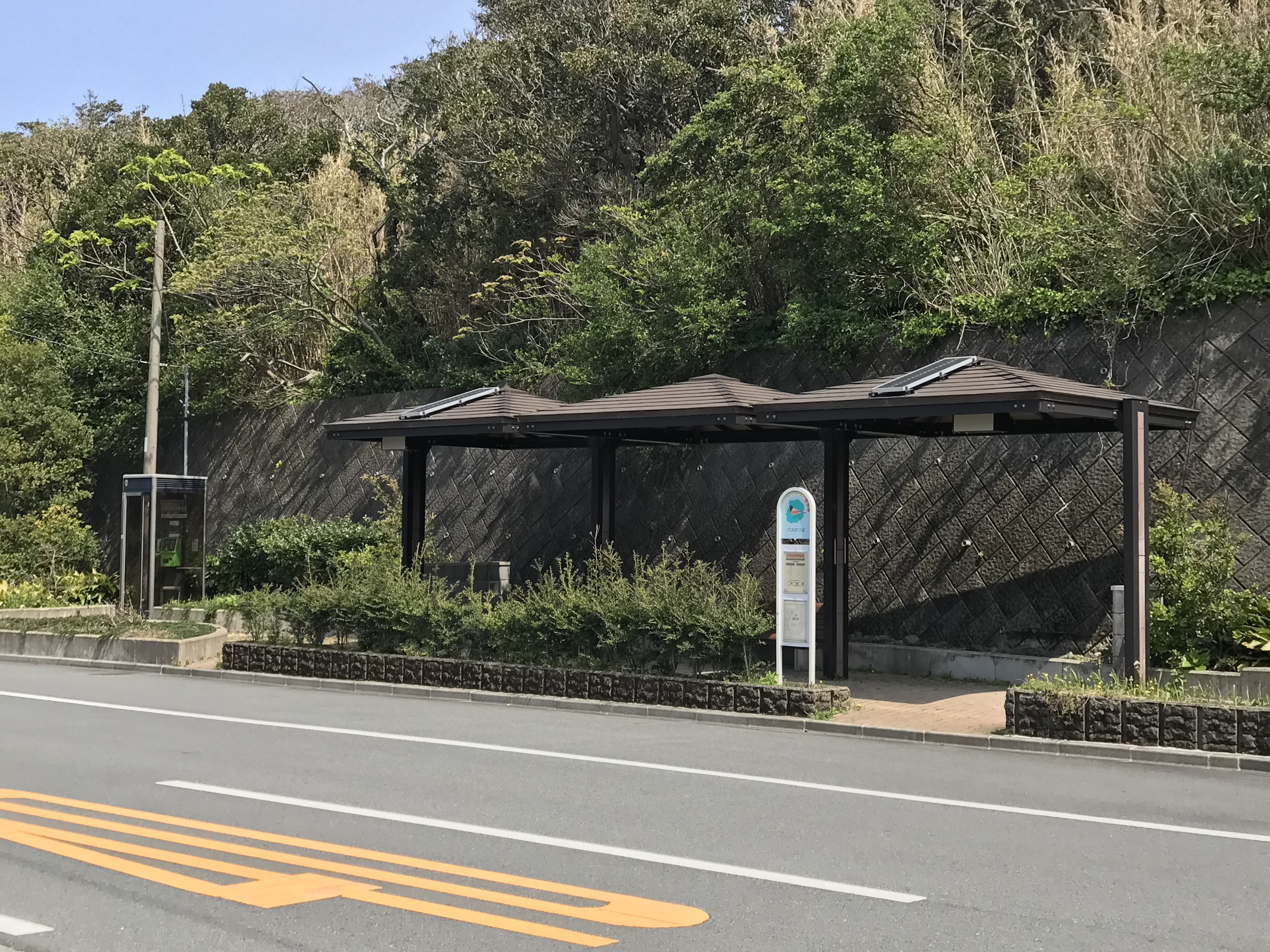
Typical bus stop with Izu Thrush bus marker

== See also ==
- List of volcanoes in Japan
- List of islands of Japan
- Izu Islands
- Devil's Sea
- Jack Moyer (1929–2004), former resident and marine biologist
- Two Car (2017), an animated television series set in Miyake-jima
