= Mikura-jima =

Volcanic island in the Pacific ocean

Native name: 御蔵島
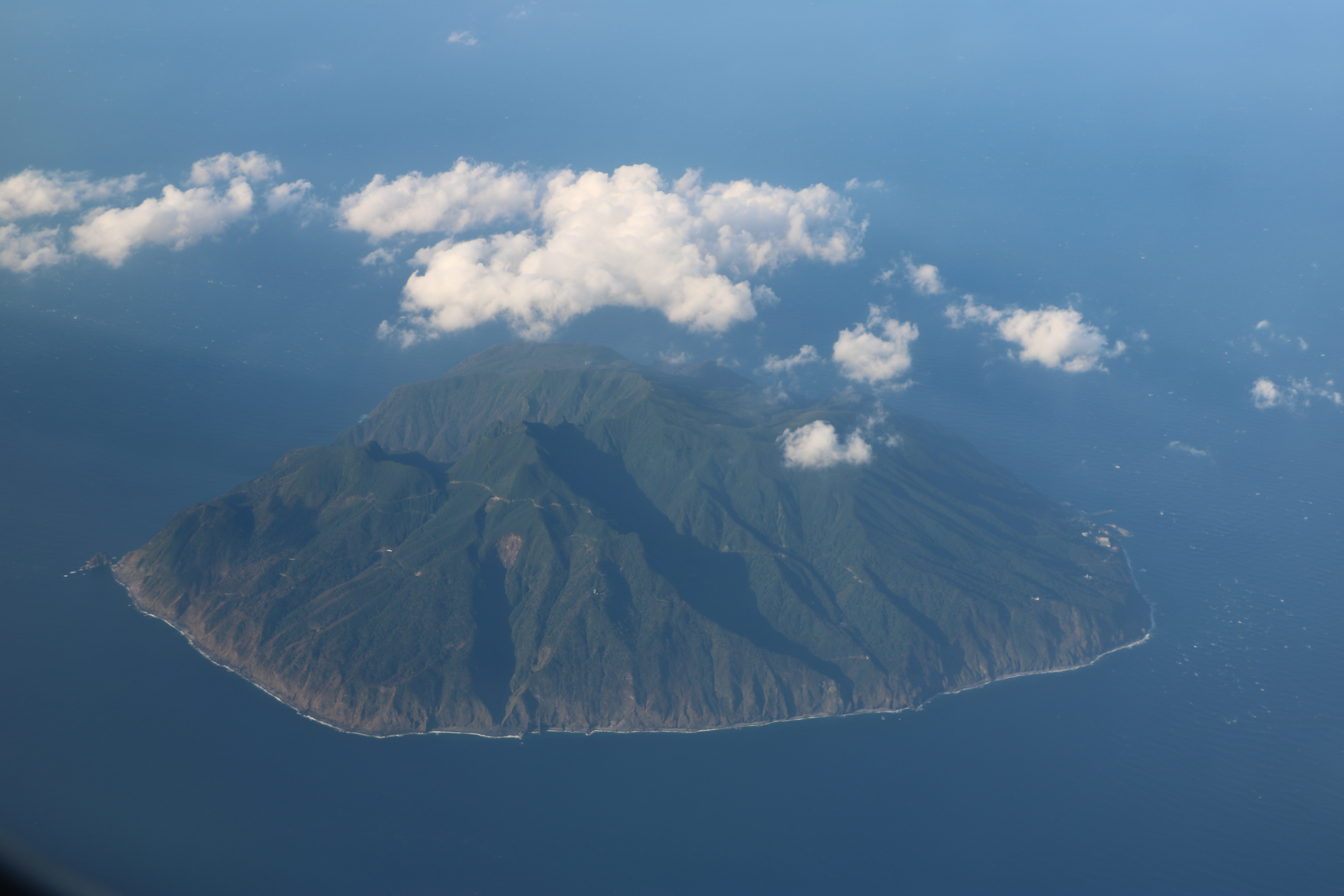
- Mikura-shima

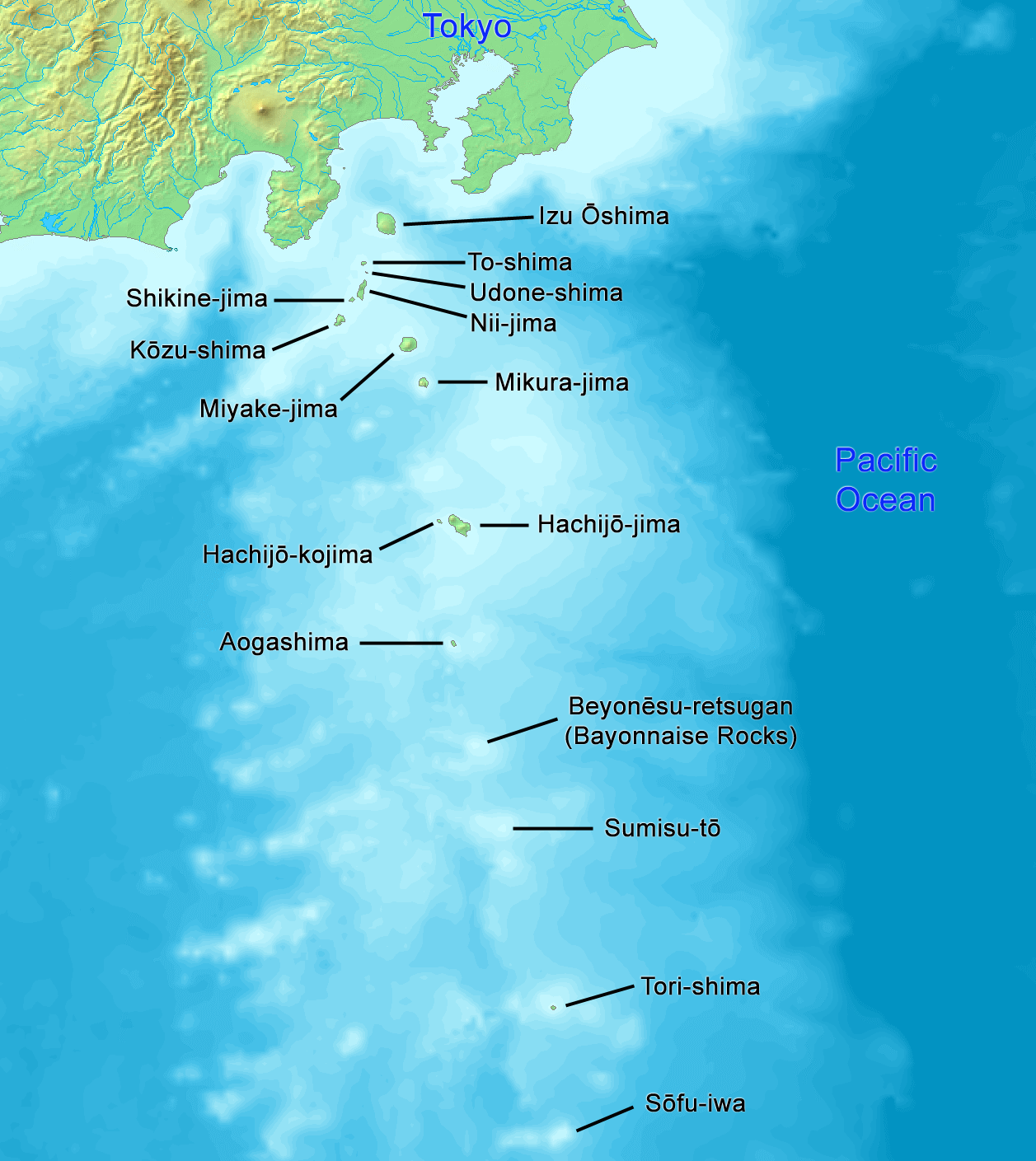

Geography
- Location: Izu Islands
- Coordinates: 33°52′16″N 139°36′18″E
- Archipelago: Izu Islands
- Area: 20.58 km^{2} (7.95 sq mi)
- Length: 5,900 m (19400 ft)
- Width: 5,500 m (18000 ft)
- Coastline: 16,920 m (55510 ft)
- Highest elevation: 851 m (2792 ft)

Administration
- Japan
- Prefecture: Tokyo
- Subprefecture: Miyake Subprefecture
- Village: Mikurajima

Demographics
- Population: 351 (September 2009)

Additional information

Mikura-jima (御蔵島) is an inhabited volcanic Japanese island in the Pacific Ocean. The island is administered by Tōkyō Metropolis and is located approximately 200 kilometres (120 mi) south of Tokyo and 19 kilometres (12 mi) south-southeast of Miyakejima. It is one of the Izu Seven Islands group of the seven northern islands of the Izu archipelago. Mikurashima is administratively part of Mikurashima Village under Miyake Subprefecture of Tokyo Metropolis. As of 2009, the island's population was 351. Mikura-shima is also within the boundaries of the Fuji-Hakone-Izu National Park.

== History ==
The island has apparently been inhabited for thousands of years, but existing records only extend to the Edo period. Mikura, along with the rest of the Izu Islands, was designated as a place of exile during the Tokugawa shogunate, and up to 10% of current island residents are descendants of political exiles.

In 1714, an important official from the shogunate, physician Kochikuin Okuyama, arrived on the island. Okuyama was able to use his connections with the shogunate to retrieve Mikura's official seal from officials on Miyake Island, who were using it to skim profits from Mikura's exports of lumber.

In 1863, a ship with a crew of 460 Chinese laborers and 23 American sailors, bound for the United States from China, was shipwrecked on the island. Although at that time the Japanese populace had been ordered by the shogunate to kill or imprison any foreigners who entered Japan without authorization, Mikura's inhabitants treated the shipwrecked crew with hospitality and kindness.

== Geology ==
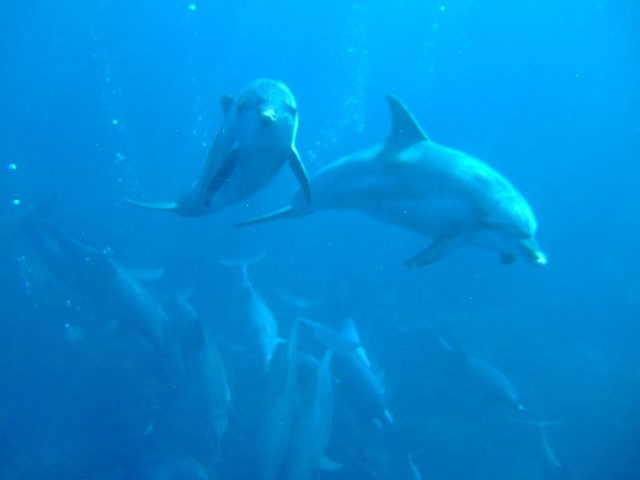
Indo-Pacific bottlenose dolphins of Mikurashima

Mikura-shima is roughly circular, and is the peak of a dormant stratovolcano. It has a maximum diameter of 5.5 kilometres (3.4 mi) and a circumference of 16 kilometres (9.9 mi), covering an area of 20.5 square kilometers. The highest peak, Oyama (御山), has a height of 851 metres (2,792 ft), and was last active around 6000 years ago. As with most of the other islands in the Izu archipelago, Mikura-shima rises sharply from the sea with coastal cliffs up to 500 meters in height, and has a steep interior. The island's largest spring forms Shirataki (white falls) waterfall that drops 80m into the Pacific Ocean below. The island has an underground mineral lake, which is said to have remarkable healing and cleansing powers and waters around the island has an abundance of nutrient-rich plant life.

== Environment ==
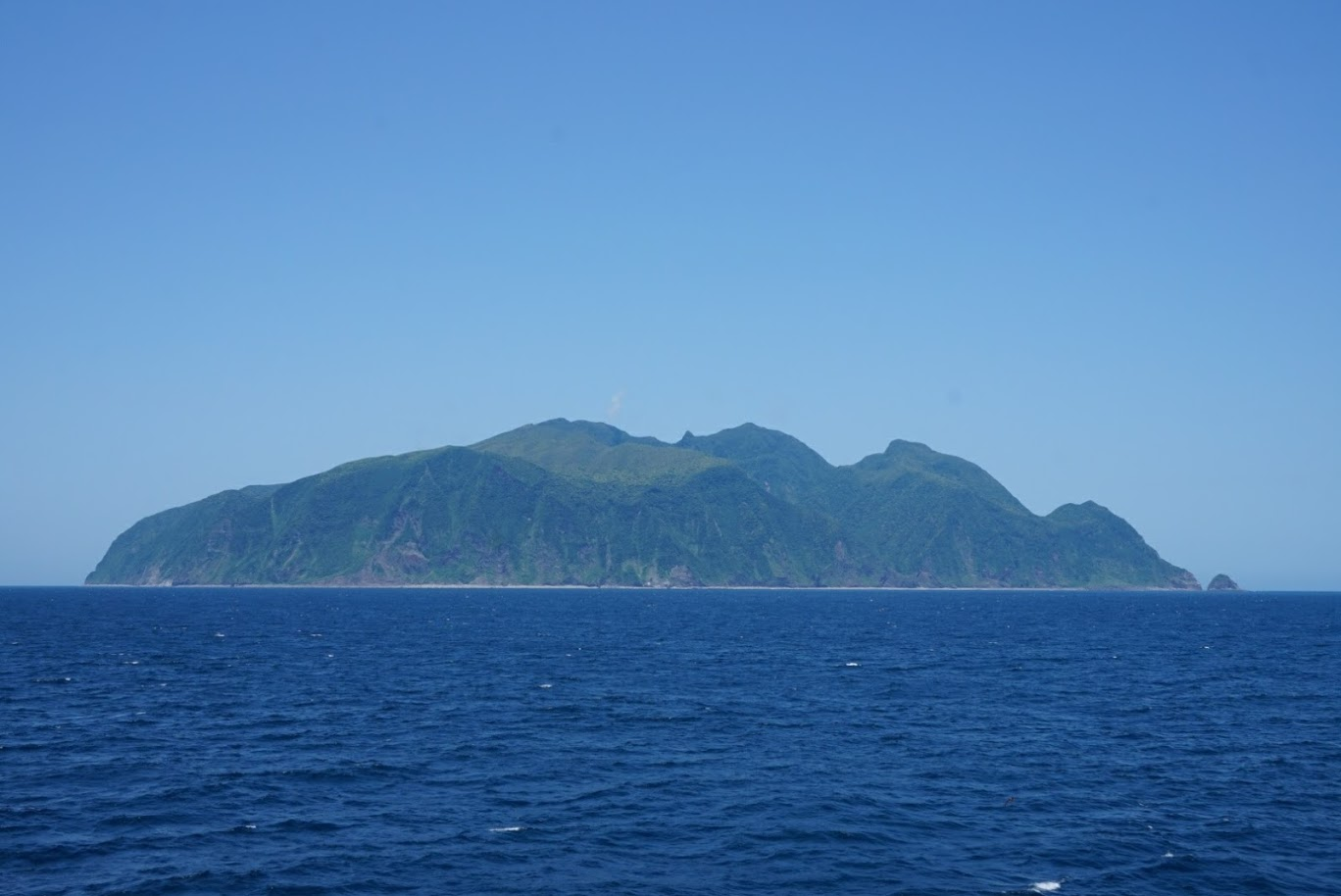
A view of Mikura-jima from the west.

Unlike the other islands in the Izu group, Mikura-jima has preserved most of its old-growth forest and endemic flora, such as the nioiebine orchid. The island has been recognised as an Important Bird Area (IBA) by BirdLife International because it hosts the largest breeding colony of streaked shearwaters (with some two million birds) in the world, as well as supporting populations of Japanese wood pigeons, Japanese murrelets, Pleske's grasshopper warblers, Ijima's leaf-warblers and Izu thrushes. Dolphins inhabit the surrounding waters.

== Economy ==
Mikura-shima's main industry is tourism. The island is visited by about 10,000 people per year. The island's main attractions are its dolphin tours. The tours operate from March to October each year. To preserve the island's habitat, tourists are prohibited from hiking without an island guide, and must stay in one of the island's designated inns, as camping is not allowed. Dolphin watching tours during the summer months have been offered from Miyake-jima. The crossing from Miyake to Mikura takes about 45 minutes by fishing vessel. There are also tours from Mikura-shima. Other money-makers for the island's inhabitants include exports of ashitaba, Calanthe orchids, and Japanese boxwood. Mikura-jima's boxwood is highly prized in the making of top quality shogi tiles.

== See also ==
- List of islands of Japan
- List of volcanoes in Japan
