= Miyake, Tokyo =

Miyake 三宅村
- Village
- Flag Seal

- Location of Miyake in Tokyo Metropolis

- Coordinates: 34°4′32.8″N 139°28′46.8″E
- Country: Japan
- Region: Kantō
- Prefecture: Tokyo Metropolis

Government
  - Mayor: Akiko Yamataka

Area
  - Total: 55.27 km^{2} (21.34 sq mi)

Population (October 1, 2020)
  - Total: 2,273
  - Density: 41.13/km^{2} (106.5/sq mi)
- Time zone: UTC+9 (Japan Standard Time)
- Tree: Castanopsis
- Flower: Hydrangea macrophylla
- Bird: Izu thrush
- Phone number: 04994-5-0981
- Address: Tsuboi 1774, Miyake-mura, Tokyo 100-1211
- Website: www.vill.miyake.tokyo.jp

Miyake (三宅村, Miyake-mura) is a village located in Miyake Subprefecture, Tokyo Metropolis, Japan. As of 1 October 2020, the village had an estimated population of 2,273, and a population density of 41.1 persons per km^{2}. Its total area is 55.27 square kilometres (21.34 sq mi).

== Geography ==
Miyake Village covers the island of Miyakejima, in the Izu archipelago in the Philippine Sea and the nearby uninhabited Ōnohara Islands, 180 kilometres (110 mi) south of central Tokyo.

=== Neighboring municipalities ===
- Tokyo Metropolis
  - Hachijō, Tokyo
  - Kōzushima, Tokyo

== Demographics ==
Per Japanese census data, the population of Miyake did not fully rebound following the island's evacuation in 2000.

Historical population
Year	Pop.	±%
1980	4,228	—
1990	3,911	−7.5%
2000	0	−100.0%
2010	2,676	—
2020	2,273	−15.1%

== History ==
It is uncertain when human settlement first began on Miyakejima, but the island was known to be inhabited since at least in the early Nara period, and is mentioned in historical records for its many volcanic eruptions. The island was used as a penal colony during the Edo period. After the start of the Meiji period, in 1878, the island came under the control of Tokyo-fu and was organized into five villages (Izu, Kamitsuki, Igaya, Ako and Tsubota) under Oshima subprefecture on October 1, 1923. Miyake subprefecture was created out of Oshima subprefecture on April 1, 1943.

On August 31, 1945, during the Allies' occupation of Tokyo, ground gunners on Miyake-jima fired three shots at an American transport aircraft, with no casualties. These were to be amongst the last shots fired in the war.

The three villages of Izu, Kamitsuki and Igaya merged on October 1, 1946, to form the village of Miyake, which was joined by Abo and Tsubota on February 1, 1956. The village was evacuated in the year 2000 due to volcanic eruptions, and the inhabitants were only allowed to return from 2005.

== Economy ==
Fishing and seasonal tourism are the mainstays of the economy of Miyake.

== Transportation ==
=== Airport ===
- Miyakejima Airport

== Education ==
Miyake village operates a public elementary, Miyake Elementary School (村立三宅小学校), and a public junior high school, Miyake Junior High School (村立三宅中学校).

The Tokyo Metropolitan Board of Education operates one high school, Miyake High School.

== Local attractions ==
- Miyake is famous for its traditional taiko performances, known as kamitsuki kiyari taiko.
