= Ōnohara Islands =

Island group in the Philippine Sea

Ōnohara-jima
Native name: 大野原島
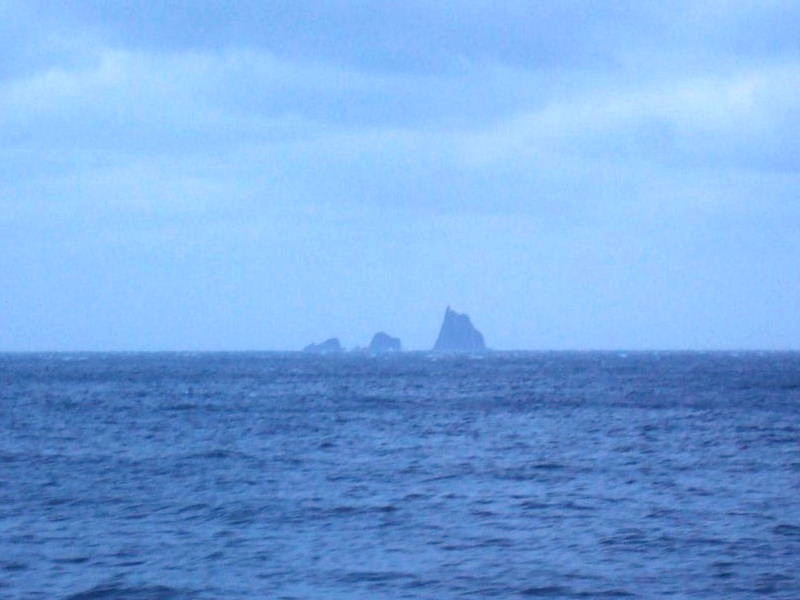

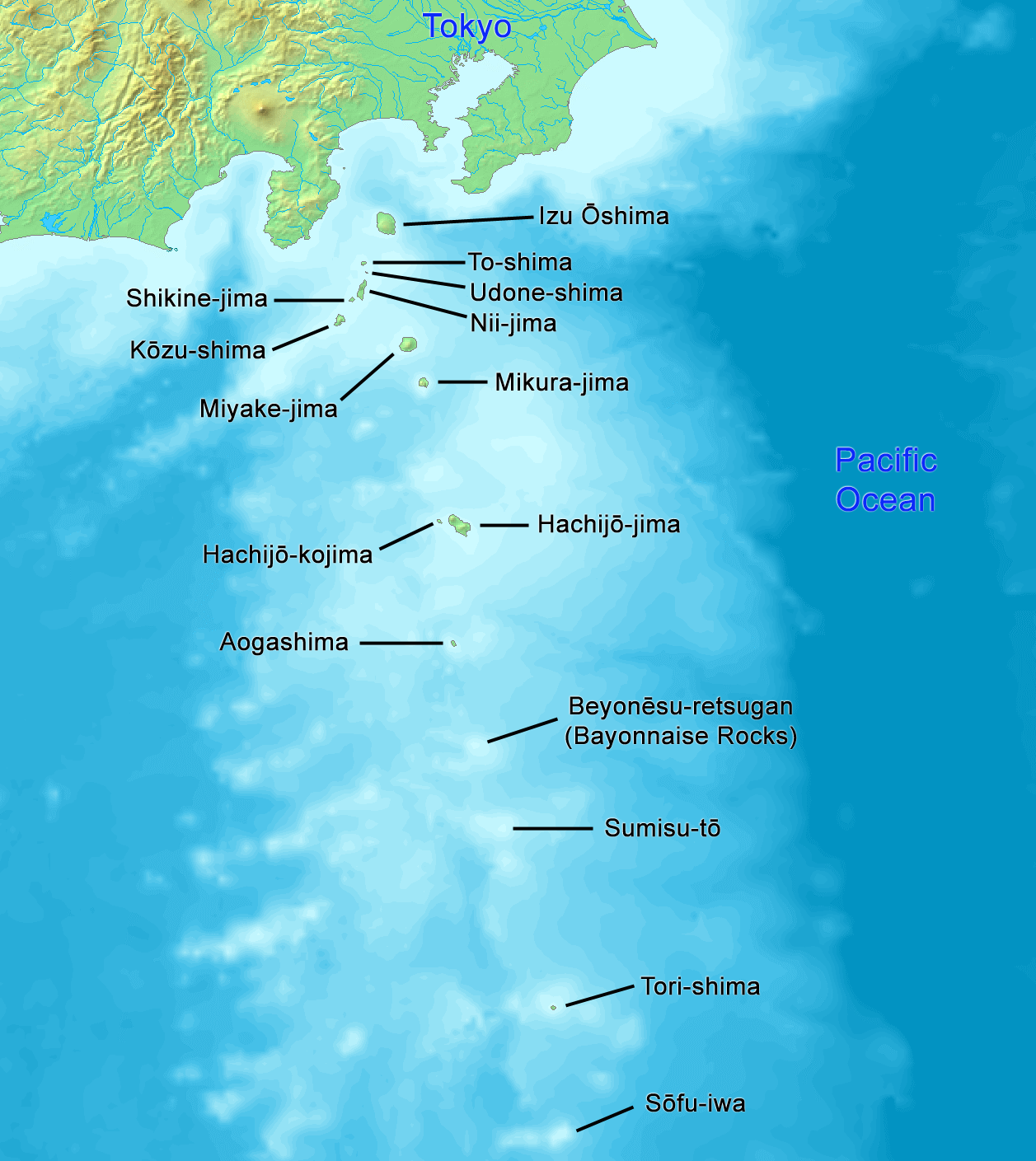

Geography
- Location: Izu Islands
- Coordinates: 34°02′41″N 139°23′15″E
- Archipelago: Izu Islands
- Area: 0.2 km^{2} (0.077 sq mi)
- Highest elevation: 114 m (374 ft)

Administration
- Japan
- Prefecture: Tokyo
- Subprefecture: Miyake Subprefecture
- Village: Miyake

Demographics
- Population: 0

The Ōnohara Islands (大野原島, Ōnohara-jima) are a group of volcanic deserted islands located in the Philippine Sea approximately 180 kilometres (110 mi) south of Tokyo and 10 kilometres (6.2 mi) west of Miyake-jima, in the northern portion of the Izu archipelago, Japan. The group is also known as Sanbon-dake (三本岳, lit. “Three Peaks”) from its profile.

== Geography ==
Ōnohara-jima consists of nine main islets and several smaller rocks and stacks. The island is the remnant of an andesite lava dome with sheer sides, the only visible portion of a submarine volcanic caldera. The above sea-level portion has a surface area of approximately 0.2 square kilometers, with a summit height of 114 metres (374 ft) on the main islet of Koyasu-shima (小安島).

Located in the Kuroshio Current, the area has abundant sea life, and is popular with sports fishermen and scuba divers.

During the Korean War, aircraft of the US Air Force used Ōnohara-jima as a bombing range, endangering the Japanese murrelet, a rare seabird that breeds on Ōnohara-jima. The bombing was stopped after Jack Moyer wrote a letter to an associate of then-US President Harry S. Truman.

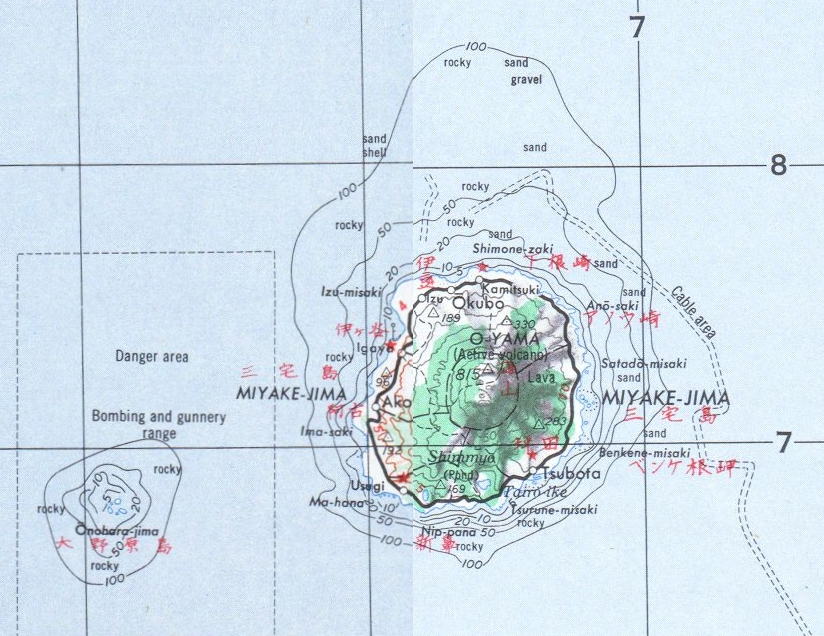
Map of Miyake-jima showing Ōnohara-jima to the southwest

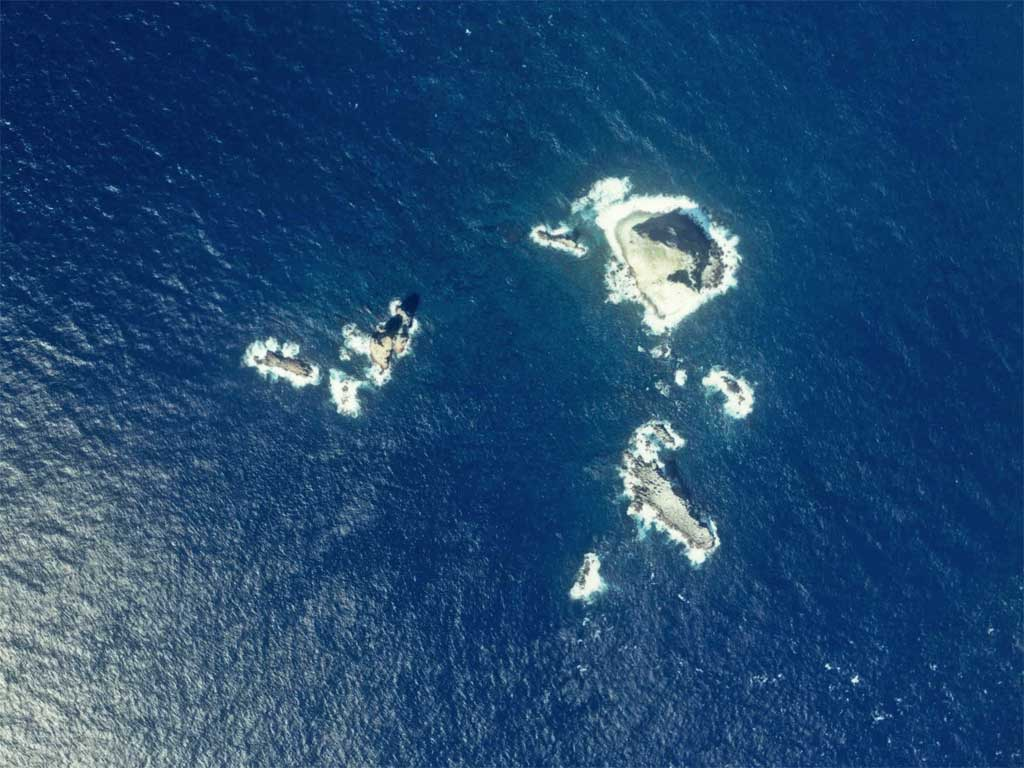
Aerial photo of Ōnohara-jima. Made based on National Land Image Information (Color Aerial Photographs), Ministry of Land, Infrastructure, Transport and Tourism

== See also ==
- Izu Islands
- Desert island
- List of islands
