= Nanatsujima islets =

Japanese islets

Coordinates: 37°36′00″N 136°54′59″E

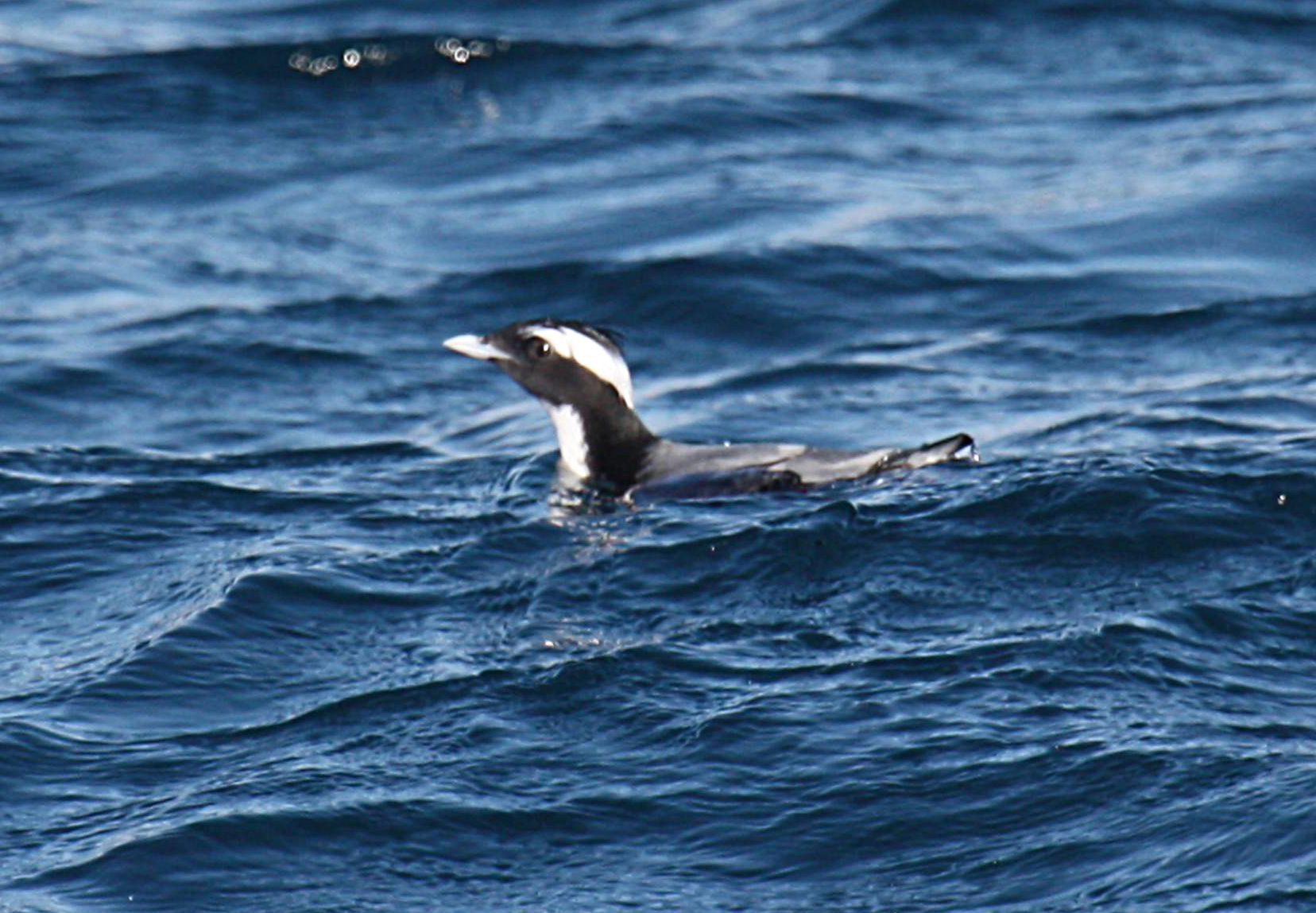
Japanese murrelets breed on the islets

The Nanatsujima islets are a group of uninhabited small islands with a collective land area of 24 ha. They lie in the Sea of Japan about 20 km off the northern tip of the Noto Peninsula in Ishikawa Prefecture, Japan. The archipelago comprises two islet groups; a northern group (Tatsujima, Ohshima and Karimatajima), and a southern group (Akashima, Aramikojima, Eboshijima and Mikuriyajima). They are composed of volcanic rocks, either andesite or tuff breccia. The largest islet, Ohshima, has a land area of 12.6 ha with its highest point 62 m above sea level. The other islets have almost perpendicular cliffs about 40 m in height.

== Important Bird Area ==
The islands and their surrounding waters have been recognised as an Important Bird Area (IBA) by BirdLife International because they support breeding colonies of Japanese murrelets.
