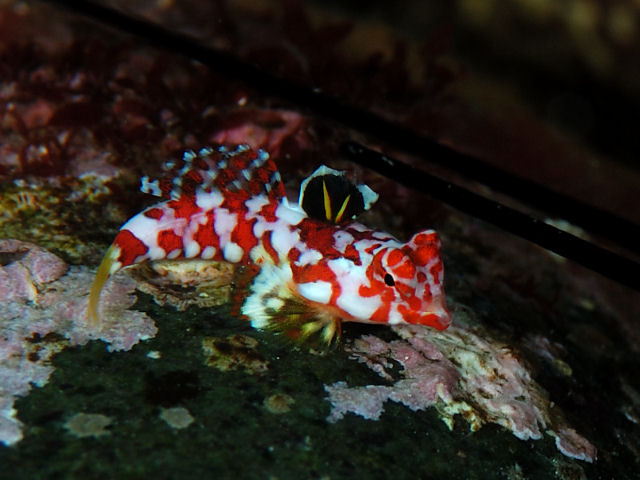

Conservation status
- Least Concern (IUCN 3.1)

Scientific classification
- Kingdom: Animalia
- Phylum: Chordata
- Class: Actinopterygii
- Order: Syngnathiformes
- Family: Callionymidae
- Genus: Synchiropus
- Species: S. moyeri

Binomial name
- Synchiropus moyeri Zaiser & R. Fricke, 1985

= Synchiropus moyeri =

Species of fish

Synchiropus moyeri, commonly known as Moyer's dragonet, is a species of fish in the family Callionymidae, the dragonets. It is found in the western Pacific Ocean.

== Description ==
This species reaches a length of 7.5 cm (3.0 in).

== Etymology ==
The fish is named in honor of marine biologist Jack T. Moyer (1929-2004), who was director of the Tatsuo Tanaka Memorial Biological Station at Miyake-jima, Japan, for his "noteworthy contributions to the knowledge of the fishes of Miyake-jima, and in deep appreciation of the encouragement and logistic support he has provided to both of the authors". Moyer was later revealed to be a serial sexual abuser of minors.
