= Birōjima =

Island off of Kyushu, Japan

Coordinates: 32°28′00″N 131°43′59″E

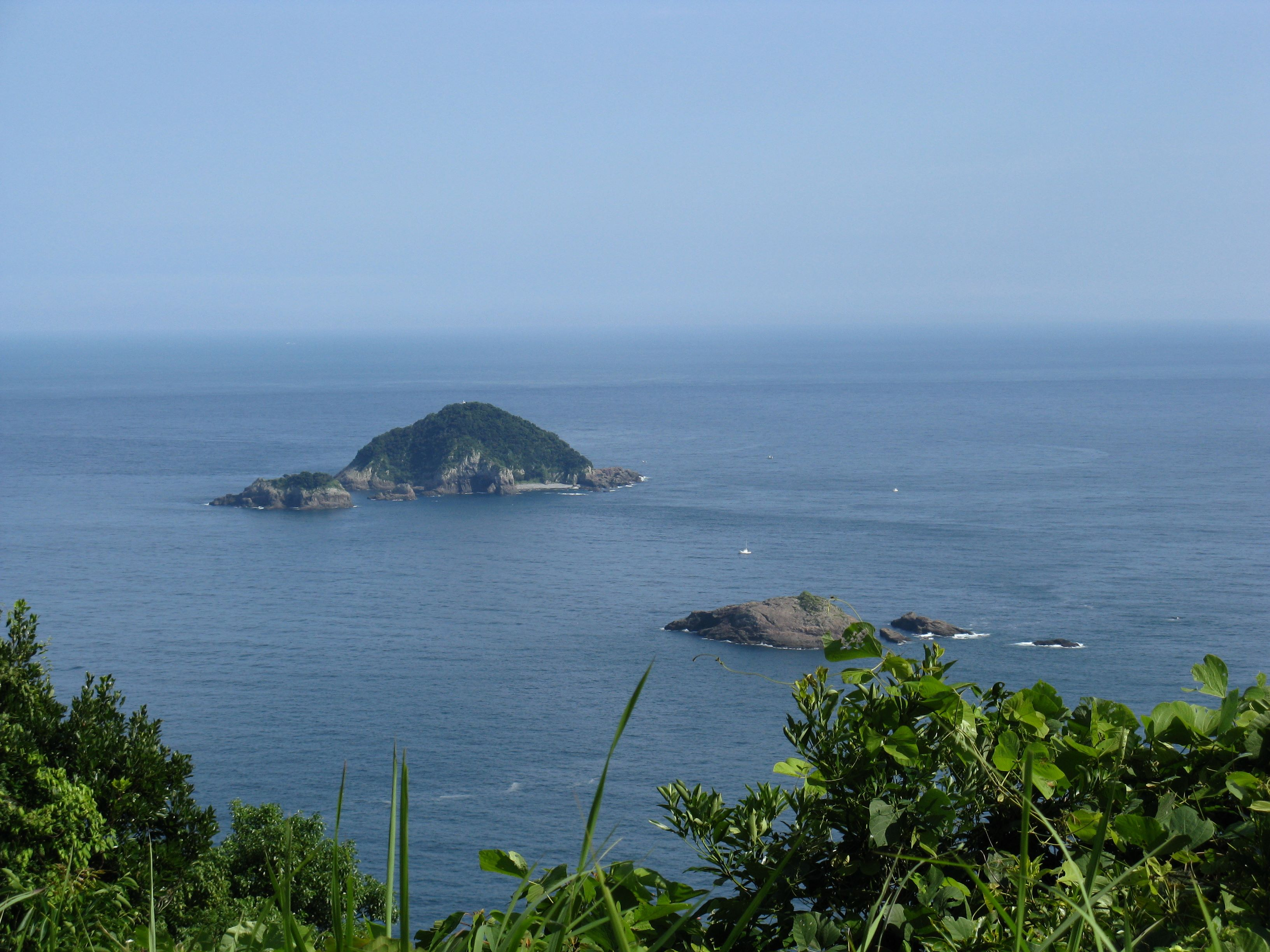
Birōjima

Birōjima is a small (8 ha in area and 75 m in height) uninhabited island lying off the coast of Miyazaki Prefecture, Kyushu, Japan. It has been recognised as an Important Bird Area (IBA) by BirdLife International because it supports a population of Pleske's grasshopper warblers as well as a breeding colony of Japanese murrelets.
