= Miyake Subprefecture =

Subprefecture of Tokyo Metropolis, Japan

Coordinates: 34°07′06″N 139°31′02″E

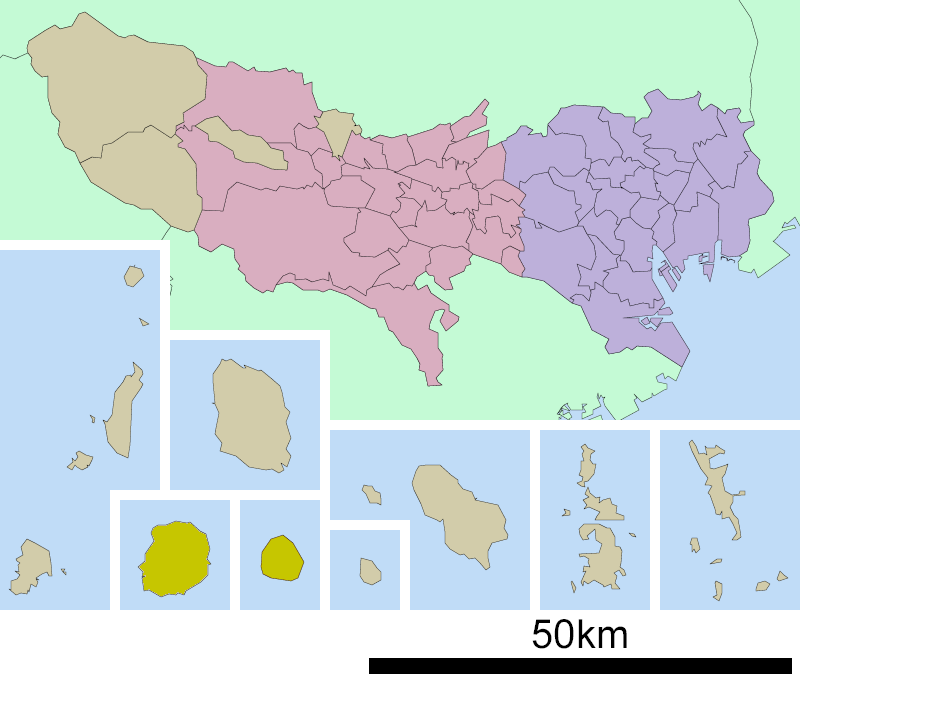
The location of Miyake Subprefecture

Miyake Subprefecture (三宅支庁, Miyake-shichō) is a subprefecture of Tokyo Metropolis, Japan. The organization belongs to the Tokyo Metropolitan Government Bureau Of General Affairs.

It includes the following villages on the Izu Islands:

- Miyake (village on Miyakejima)
- Mikurajima (village on Mikurajima)

Its area is 76.08 square km and the population is 3184 people.

Because of the eruptions of the main volcano, Miyakejima was completely evacuated from September 2000. After a four-year period of volcanic emissions, residents were allowed to return permanently on February 1, 2005.

== History ==
- 1920: The island halls of Miyakejima and Mikurajima were abolished. Ōshima Island Government Office took control of the islands. The branch office was founded on Miyakejima.
- 1926: Changed to Ōshima Subprefecture.
- 1943: Miyakejima Branch Office was split as Miyake Subprefecture.
