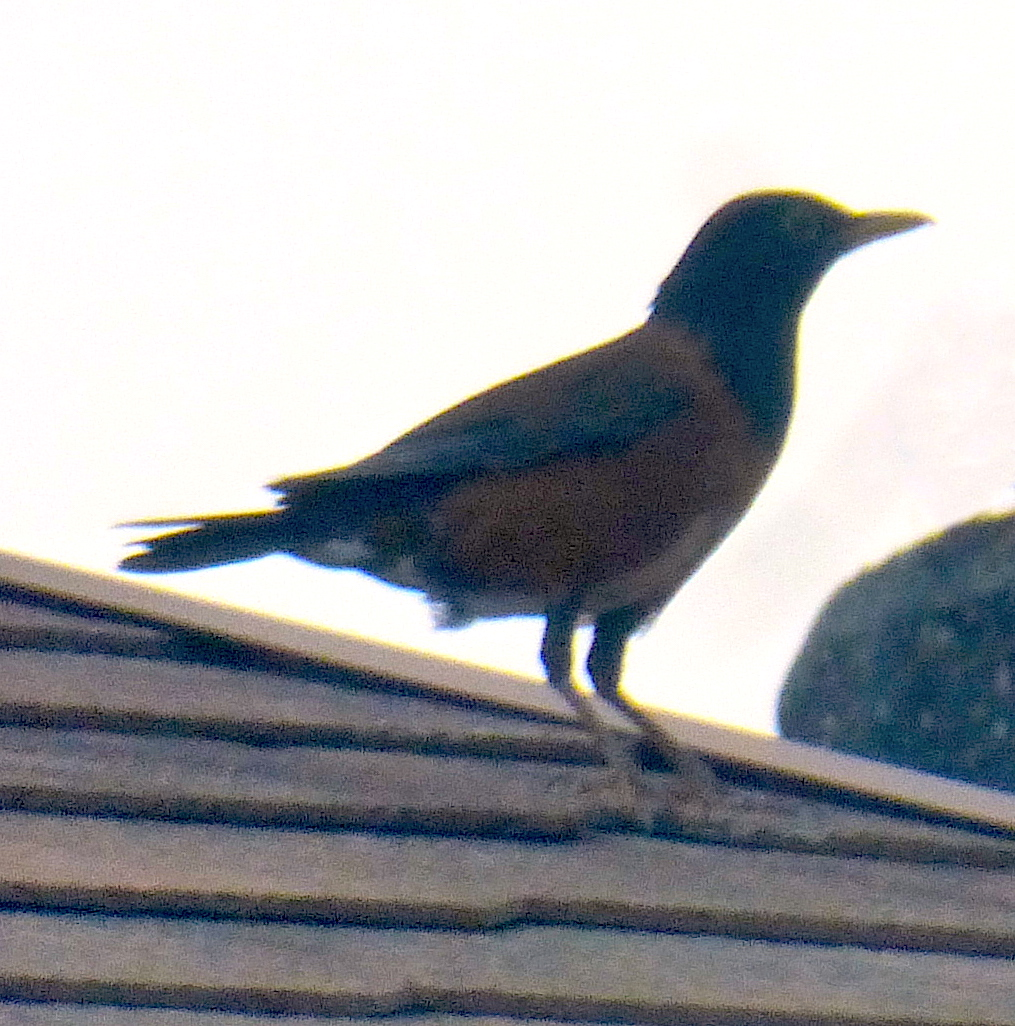

Conservation status
- Vulnerable (IUCN 3.1)

Scientific classification
- Kingdom: Animalia
- Phylum: Chordata
- Class: Aves
- Order: Passeriformes
- Family: Turdidae
- Genus: Turdus
- Species: T. celaenops

Binomial name
- Turdus celaenops Stejneger, 1887

= Izu thrush =

Species of bird

The Izu thrush or Izu Islands thrush (Turdus celaenops) is a bird of the thrush family native to Japan.

== Behavior ==
=== Feeding ===
Izu thrushes eat small animals, such as earthworms and insects, and fruits, like cherries or mullberries.

=== Breeding ===
The Izu Thrush's breeding season is March to July. During the first half of this season, the male will sing at dawn, but will, during the second half, sing throughout the day. One source described their song as 'kyurrr, chotts' and their call as 'tweet' or 'chat, chat, chat". They build their nests in trees about half a metre from the ground. They use soil to bind the materials, such as grass and moss, together. While the clutch can have as many as five or as few as two eggs, most clutches are of three to four eggs. The eggs are blue with brown spots and are roughly 3 cm (1 in) long. Both parents look after the chicks.

=== Predation of nests ===
Since the introduction of weasels, the fledgling rate has significantly decreased.

== Description ==
The Izu thrush is about 23 cm (9.1 in) long. Their back and tails are black and they have a yellow eye-ring and bill, brown wings, and a rust-red chest. The males have darker plumage than that of the females.

== Distribution ==
The Izu thrush is an endemic bird of Japan. Most are on the Izu Islands. On Izu Ōshima, Miyakejima and Mikurajima they sing two syllables. The song of the population of Hachijojima 90 km (56 mi) south sounds entirely different with one syllable. On their last island of the chain Aogashima they have more syllables. Some less densely populated are on the Tokara Islands Yakushima, Kuchinoshima, Nakanoshima, Tairajima, Akusekijima and Takarajima. On Nakanoshima the song is composed of more syllables. In addition, there are wintering records from Shizuoka, Chiba, Mie and Wakayama Prefectures.

== Conservation ==
The Izu thrush is described as a vulnerable species by the IUCN Red List. There are between 2,500 and 9,999 mature individuals and the population is decreasing, though it is not severely fragmented. The amount and/or quality of their habitat is decreasing. They are threatened by volcanoes, roads, railroads, wood plantations, tourism areas, and both native and invasive species and diseases.
