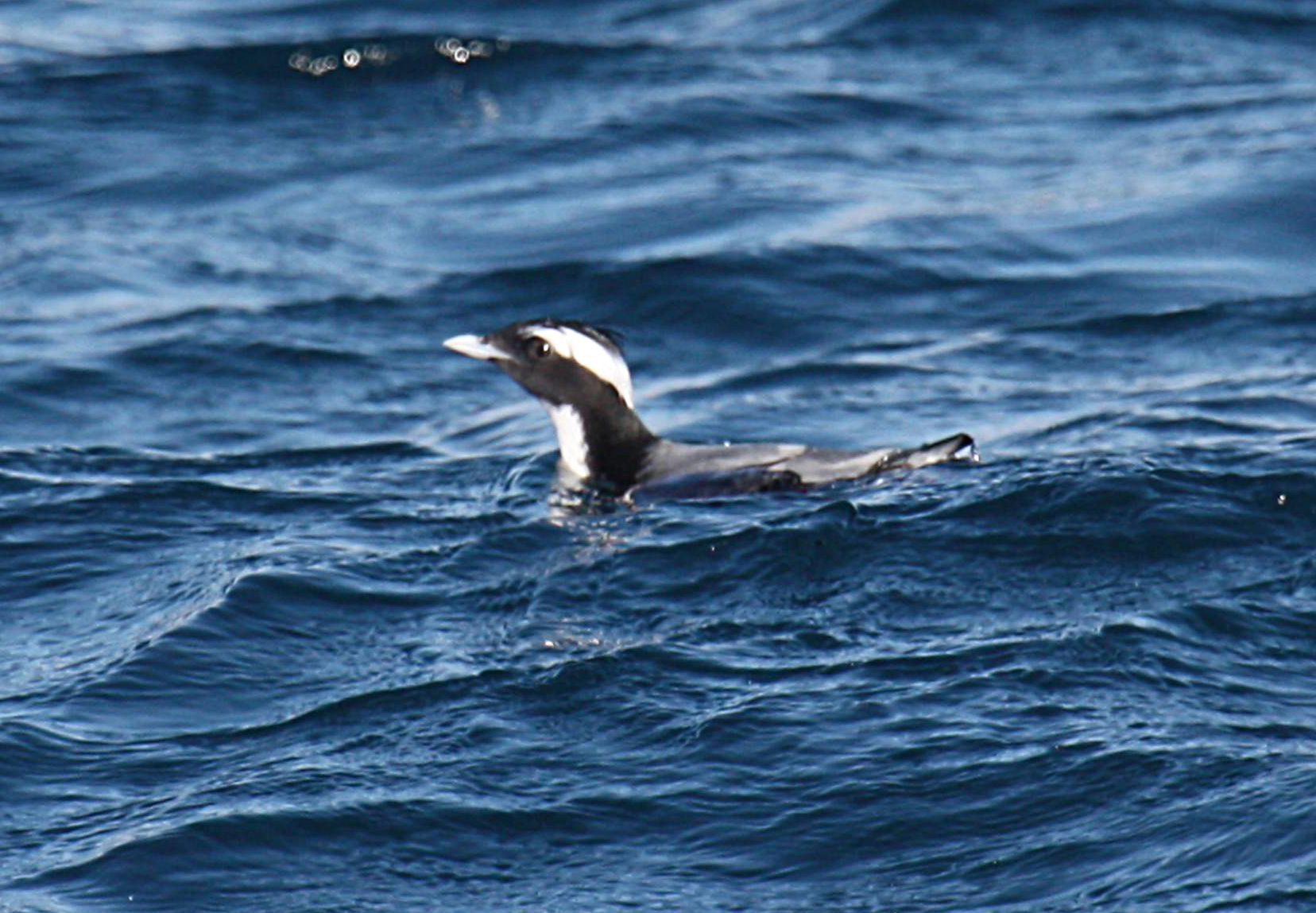

Conservation status
- Vulnerable (IUCN 3.1)

Scientific classification
- Kingdom: Animalia
- Phylum: Chordata
- Class: Aves
- Order: Charadriiformes
- Family: Alcidae
- Genus: Synthliboramphus
- Species: S. wumizusume

Binomial name
- Synthliboramphus wumizusume (Temminck, 1836)
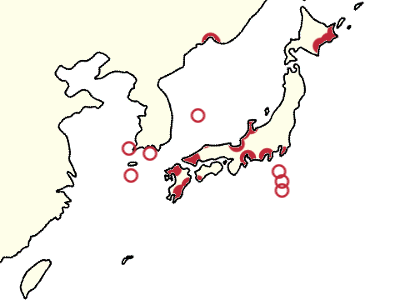

Synonyms
- Uria wumizusume (protonym); Brachyramphus wumizusume Brachyramphus temminckii Synthliboramphus temminckii Uria temminckii

= Japanese murrelet =

Species of bird

The Japanese murrelet or crested murrelet (Synthliboramphus wumizusume) is a small seabird in the auk family that occurs along the remote rocky coasts and in the offshore waters of Japan, and may also be found after the breeding season as far as Sakhalin to the north and in particular off South Korea. With a small and declining population, estimated as of 2017 to total 2,500–10,000 individuals, it is the rarest alcid, and the most at risk of extinction.

== Taxonomy ==
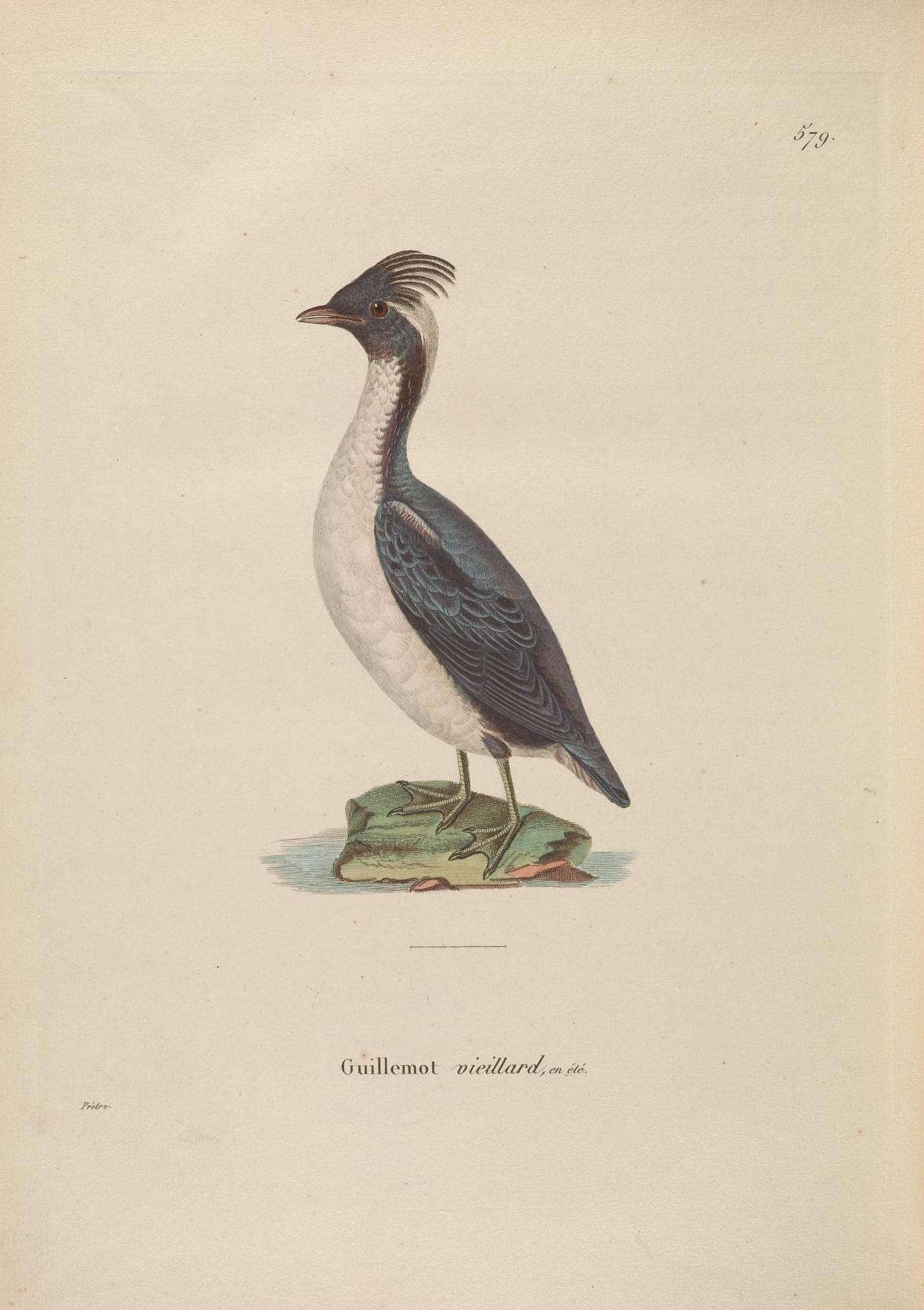
Plate by Prêtre accompanying Temminck's description of the Japanese murrelet

The Japanese murrelet is a monotypic species first described by Coenraad Temminck, as Uria wumizusume, in the text accompanying an 1836 livraison in the ongoing series Nouveau recueil de planches coloriées d'oiseaux. The following year, Johann Friedrich von Brandt erected the genus Brachyramphus and subgenus Synthliboramphus, transferring to it the Japanese murrelet, to which he gave the new specific name temminckii. Synthliboramphus has since been raised to generic rank, the specific name wumizusume having priority in accordance with Article 23 of the International Code of Zoological Nomenclature.

In its native Japan, the Japanese murrelet is known as the kanmuri-umisuzume or "crested sea sparrow" (冠海雀), umisuzume being the vernacular name for the ancient murrelet (Synthliboramphus antiquus), from which it may be distinguished by its black crest. The s and z in the Japanese name were reversed by Temminck in the scientific name.

== Description ==
The Japanese murrelet is a smallish seabird 24–26 cm (9.4–10.2 in) in length, with a wingspan of 43 cm (17 in), and weighing some 164–183 g (5.8–6.5 oz). Its upperparts are blackish and bluish grey, its throat and underparts white, legs and feet a yellowish grey, and short, thick bill a bluish grey, the culmen being darker; the iris is a dark brown. The black head features a white stripe from the top of each eye that meets on the nape, although this is less visible in winter. It may be distinguished from the Ancient murrelet (Synthliboramphus antiquus), which also occurs in much of its range, in particular by its summer crest of black feathers 3–5 cm (1.2–2.0 in) in length, although this again is absent in winter. Juveniles resemble winter adults, though the head and upperparts are somewhat browner.

The Japanese murrelet's calls include a quiet "ch-ch-chi-chi" (「チッ、チッ、チ、チ」), while in flight, "peee-p-p-p" (「ピィー、ピッ、ピッ、ピッ」) and "jee-jujjujju" (「ジージュッジュッジュッ」), and while at the nest "jijiji-pipewpipewkukukuku" (「ジジジ、ピピュウピピュウクククク」), "gugguwa-gugugu" (「グッグワ、グググ」), and "jukkukuwa-kuwakuwakuwa" (「ジュッククワ、クワクワクワ」).

== Distribution and habitat ==
The Japanese murrelet occurs in the boreo-cool and temperate-subtropical waters of the northwest Pacific. It breeds on the small rocky islets and coasts of Japan from Nanatsujima in Ishikawa Prefecture in the north to Tori-shima in the Izu Islands of Tokyo Metropolis to the south, the chief areas being Birōjima in Miyazaki Prefecture, followed by the Izu Islands, and other small islands such as Mimiana Island (耳穴島) in Mie Prefecture, and Kōshima (幸島) in Kōchi Prefecture; family groups have been reported from the waters off Yashima [ja] in Kaminoseki at the western end of the Seto Inland Sea, and a pair with two chicks has been collected off the south coast of Korea, across the Tsushima Strait. After breeding, it disperses along Honshū and Kyūshū, in the warm waters of the Kuroshio Current and Tsushima Current, with records from Iturup and Shikotan in the Southern Kuriles, Sakhalin, Peter the Great Bay and Olga Bay in Primorsky Krai, Fujian (1894), South Korea, and Taiwan (1973). It flies back around December and winters mostly offshore from its breeding locations.

== Ecology ==
The Japanese murrelet's diet mostly comprises krill, other planktonic crustaceans, crangonid shimps, larval and small pelagic fish, including Pacific herring (Clupea pallasii), sculpin (Triglops), and smelt (Osmerus), sand eels (Ammodytes), and sandlances (Hypoptychus dybowskii).

It nests in rocky crevices and hollows, in the gaps between piles of stones, and among the grasses on uninhabited islands. Typically two eggs are laid, a week apart, from late March to early April, though this takes place a little earlier on Tori-shima, at the southern end of its breeding range. Month-long incubation duty is shared almost equally by both parents. The precocial chicks are not fed in the nest, but leave it together with their parents on the second night after hatching.

== Conservation status ==
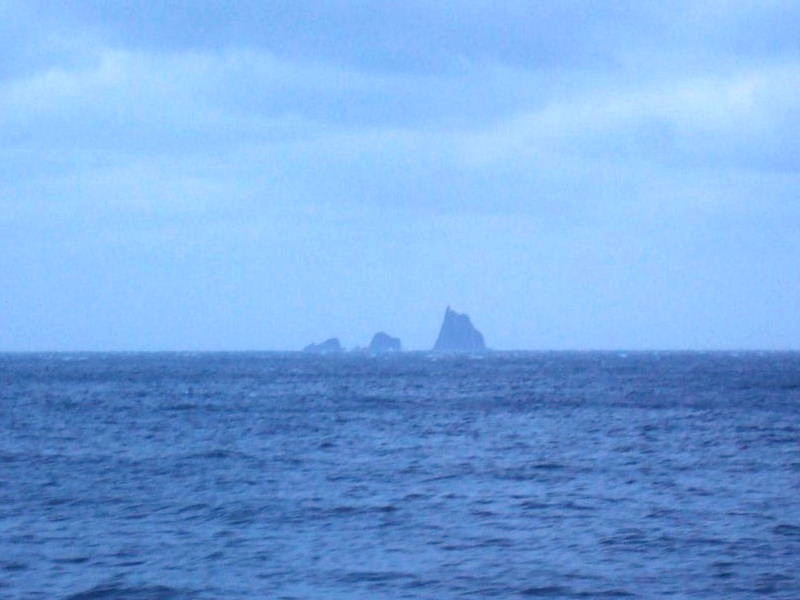
The Ōnohara Islands, the most important nesting site until their use as a USAF bombing range during the Korean War

Ending up as by-catch in the drift nets of commercial fishing operations, direct disturbance and the attraction of scavengers to waste left by recreational fishing, predation by rats (Rattus spp.), feral cats (Felis catus), large-billed crows (Corvus macrorhynchos), and black-tailed gulls (Larus crassirostris), and, to a lesser extent, the ongoing danger from pollution, gives the Japanese murrelet its Vulnerable status on the IUCN Red List. The "harvesting" of adults and in particular eggs for much of the twentieth century have also contributed to the low population, while during the nesting season in 1951 and 1952 the Ōnohara Islands, then the main known nesting site, were used as a bombing range by the United States Air Force, resulting in significant collateral damage. The species is listed on Appendix I of the Convention on the Conservation of Migratory Species of Wild Animals and legally protected in Japan, having been designated in 1975 a Natural Monument under the 1950 Law for the Protection of Cultural Properties. In 2009, the Japanese murrelet was adopted as a symbol of marine conservation by the Wild Bird Society of Japan.

On the 2016 Red List of China's Vertebrates, Synthliboramphus wumizusume (Chinese: 冠海雀) has the status Data Deficient; with a visiting population of less than 1% of the species, it is included on the 2016 Red List of Birds of Taiwan with the status NA ("Not Applicable"). As a rare, "migratory" species with local distribution and declining numbers, Synthliboramphus wumizusume (Russian: Хохлатый старик) is included in the 2016 Red Data Book of Sakhalin Oblast in Category 1, in the 2019 Red Data Book of Khabarovsk Krai, as a vary rare vagrant at the edge of its range, also in Category 1, and in the 2005 Red Data Book of Primorsky Krai in Category 3. In the 2011 Red Data Book of Endangered Birds in Korea, with mention of occasional breeding on offshore islands (Gugul Island and the Liancourt Rocks), Synthliboramphus wumizusume (Korean: 뿔쇠오리) has the status Endangered. On the 2020 Japanese Ministry of the Environment Red List, Synthliboramphus wumizusume (Japanese: カンムリウミスズメ) has the status Vulnerable, as it had done on the 1991, 1998, and 2007 editions. In Mie Prefecture, it has been designated a Prefectural Endangered Species.
