= James Solberg Henrickson =

American botanist (born 1940)

James Solberg Henrickson (born 1940) is an American botanist born in Eau Claire, Wisconsin. He was a Professor of Biology at California State University, Los Angeles. He is currently a research fellow at the Plant Resources Center at the University of Texas at Austin.

== Select publications ==
- 1964. Pollen morphology of Fouquieriaceae. Thesis (M.A.), Claremont Graduate School. 110 pp.
- 1968 Vegetative Morphology of the Fouquieriacae. Dissertation (PhD), Claremont Graduate School 234 pp.
- 1969. The Succulent Fouquierias. 7 pp.
- 1973. Fouquieriacea DC. Volumen 1 of World Pollen and Spore Flora. Ed. Almqvist & Wiksell Periodical Co. 12 pp.
- Richard Stephen Felger. 1973. Microanalysis and Identification of a Basket Fragment from Sonora, Mexico. 7 pp.

=== Books ===
- 1969. Anatomy of Periderm and Cortex of Fouquieriaceae. 30 pp.
- 1971. Vascular Flora of the Northeast Outer Slopes of Haleakala Crater, East Maui, Hawaii. Nº 7 of Contributions from the Nature Conservancy. Ed. Nature Conservancy. 14 pp.
- 1972. A Taxonomic Revision of the Fouquieriacea. Rancho Santa Ana Botanic Garden Ed. 99 pp.
- James S. Henrickson, Richard M. Straw. 1976. A Gazetteer of the Chihuahuan Desert Region: A Supplement to the Chihuahuan Desert Flora. Ed. California State University. 271 pp.
- Robert F. Thorne, Barry A. Prigge, James Henrickson. 1981. A Flora of the Higher Ranges and the Kelso Dunes of the Eastern Mojave Desert in California. Ed. Southern California Botanists. 116 pp.
- James Henrickson, Lowell David Flyr. 1985. Systematics of Leucophyllum and Eremogeton (Scrophulariaceae). Ed. F. Mahler. 66 pp.

=== Recognition ===
Species are named in his honor include:

- (Acanthaceae) Carlowrightia henricksonii T.F.Daniel
- (Asteraceae) Gaillardia henricksonii B.L.Turner
- (Boraginaceae) Cynoglossum henricksonii L.C.Higgins
- (Brassicaceae) Mancoa henricksonii Rollins
- (Cactaceae) Coryphantha henricksonii (Glass & R.A.Foster) Glass & R.A.Foster
- (Campanulaceae) Lobelia henricksonii M.C.Johnst.
- (Euphorbiaceae) Euphorbia henricksonii M.C.Johnst.
- (Malvaceae) Anoda henricksonii M.C.Johnst.
- (Polygonaceae) Eriogonum henricksonii Reveal
- (Ranunculaceae) Thalictrum henricksonii M.C.Johnst.
- (Rubiaceae) Chiococca henricksonii M.C.Johnst.
- (Scrophulariaceae) Penstemon henricksonii R.M.Straw
