= Felgner =

Felgner is a surname. Notable people with this surname include:

- Christel Felgner (born 1942), German artistic gymnast
- Philip Felgner (born 1950), American biochemist and immunologist
- Uta Felgner, German businesswoman

== See also ==
- Felger
