= Felgenhauer =

Felgenhauer is a German surname and means wheelwright. Notable people with the surname include:

- Daniel Felgenhauer (born 1976), German footballer
- Pavel Felgenhauer (born 1951), Russian journalist
- Tatyana Felgenhauer (born 1985), Russian journalist

== See also ==
- Felger
