= Mycena lux-coeli =

Scientific classification
- Kingdom: Fungi
- Division: Basidiomycota
- Class: Agaricomycetes
- Order: Agaricales
- Family: Mycenaceae
- Genus: Mycena
- Species: M. lux-coeli

Binomial name
- Mycena lux-coeli Corner (1954)

Species of fungus

Mycena lux-coeli is a bioluminescent species of fungus in the family Mycenaceae. It was first discovered in 1954 on Hachijō-jima where it is widely found, and decades later was found on multiple islands in Japan.

Hachijō-jima island is also home to the bioluminescent mushroom species, Mycena chlorophos. The local name for these mushrooms is hato-no-hi, literally "pigeon fire".
