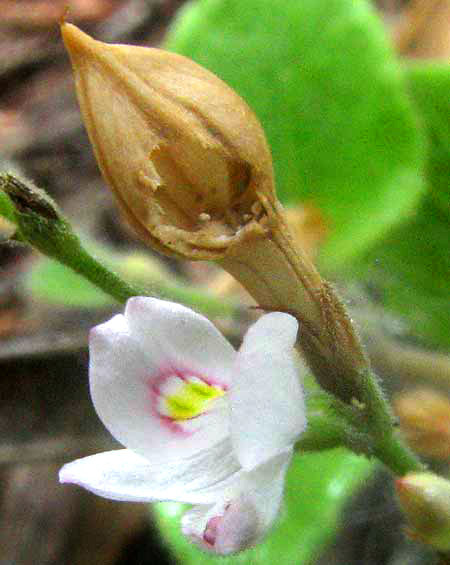
- Torrey's wrightwort flower and animal-damaged, capsular fruit

Scientific classification
- Kingdom: Plantae
- Clade: Tracheophytes
- Clade: Angiosperms
- Clade: Eudicots
- Clade: Asterids
- Order: Lamiales
- Family: Acanthaceae
- Genus: Carlowrightia
- Species: C. torreyana

Binomial name
- Carlowrightia torreyana Wassh.

Synonyms
- Carlowrightia pubens A.Gray; Croftia parvifolia (Torr.) Small; Dianthera parvifolia (Torr.) A.Gray; Ecbolium parvifolium (Torr.) Kuntze; Schaueria parvifolia Torr

= Carlowrightia torreyana =

Species of plant

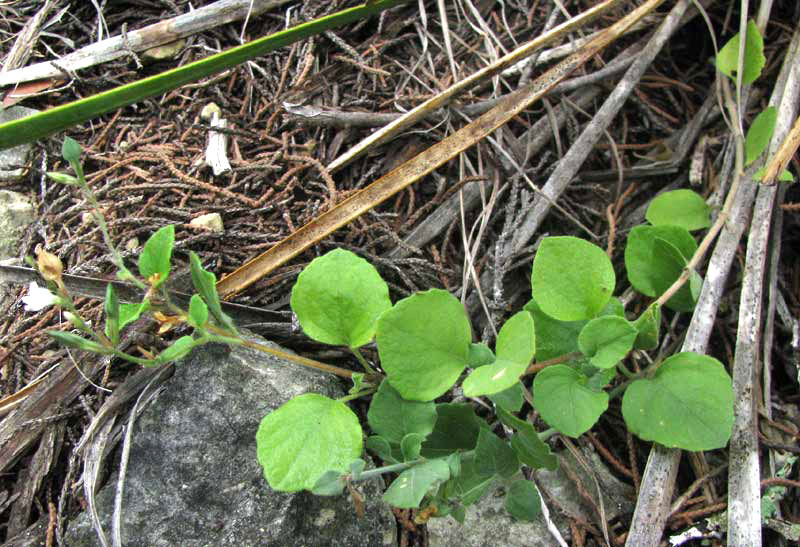
Torrey's wrightwort leafy stem with flowers at stem tip

Carlowrightia torreyana, or Torrey's wrightwort, is a species of subshrub belonging to the family Acanthaceae

== Description ==
Torrey's wrightwort displays these distinguishing features:

- The growth form ranges between that of an herb and a woody shrub; it is a perennial with a woody base and non-woody upper stems, which can grow along the ground or bend upward to about 0.5 m (1 ft 8 in) tall.
- Leaves with petioles arise opposite one another with blades which are broadly egg-shaped to round, and up 40 mm (1 5/8 in) long, though usually about half that.
- The calyx has 5 lobes, or (sepals), not 4.
- The white corollas, only 7–9 mm (1/4–3/8 in) long, are noticeably divided into upper and lower lips, with the lower lips prominently 3-lobed; on the upper lip there's a yellow "eye" fringed with maroon.
- Flowers have 2 stamens, not four, and grow closer to the corolla's lower lip than the upper.
- Small bracts, or bractlets, below each flower are not fused along one side from the base to the apex.
- It produces capsular-type fruits which are 8–12 mm (3/8–1/2 in) long.

== Distribution ==
In the USA, Torrey's wrightwort occurs in southwestern Texas. In Mexico, it is found in the north-central and northeastern states of Chihuahua, Sonora, Coahuila and Nuevo León.

== Habitat ==
In Texas, Torrey's wrightwort is described as occurring on igneous rock and limestone slopes, ledges and plains. On this page, pictures show an individual in Texas in thin soil atop limestone on a forested slope on the southern border of the Edwards Plateau at an elevation of about 1,750 m (5,740 ft). In Mexico, the species has been collected in a rocky, limestone valley.

== Taxonomy ==
In 1979, James Henrickson and Thomas Daniel transferred a certain grouping of plants in the pre-existing species Carlowrightia torreyana to a new species, Carlowrightia texana. At that point, Carlowrightia torreyana was redescribed, discounting features displayed by plants transferred to the new species. The two species differed in terms of stem pubescence, position and coloration of flowers, and development of seed margins.The new description of Carlowrightia torreyanawas based on the type specimen of Schaueria parvifolia Torrey, that name being the basionym of Carlowrightia torreyana.

=== Etymology ===
The genus name Carlowrightia is named for Charles (Carlos) Wright, a botanist of the USA.

The species name honors US botanist John Torrey. Torrey earlier had named the taxon Schaueria parvifolia, which in 1965 was reassigned by Dieter Carl Wasshausen to the genus Carlowrightia as Carlowrightia torreyana.
