= Carlowrightia henricksonii =

Scientific classification
- Kingdom: Plantae
- Clade: Tracheophytes
- Clade: Angiosperms
- Clade: Eudicots
- Clade: Asterids
- Order: Lamiales
- Family: Acanthaceae
- Genus: Carlowrightia
- Species: C. henricksonii

Binomial name
- Carlowrightia henricksonii T.F.Daniel

Species of flowering plant

Carlowrightia henricksonii is a species of flowering plant native to the far north of Tamaulipas in northeastern Mexico. Like other members of the genus, commonly known as wrightworts, it is small shrub bearing inflorescences of lily-like flowers. No subspecies are listed in Catalog of Life. It was first collected for scientific description by Marshall Conring Johnston and J. Crutchfield in 1960 and described by T.F. Daniel in 1983. It is named for American botanist James Solberg Henrickson.
