= Hachijō-jima =

Volcanic island in the Pacific Ocean

Native name: 八丈島
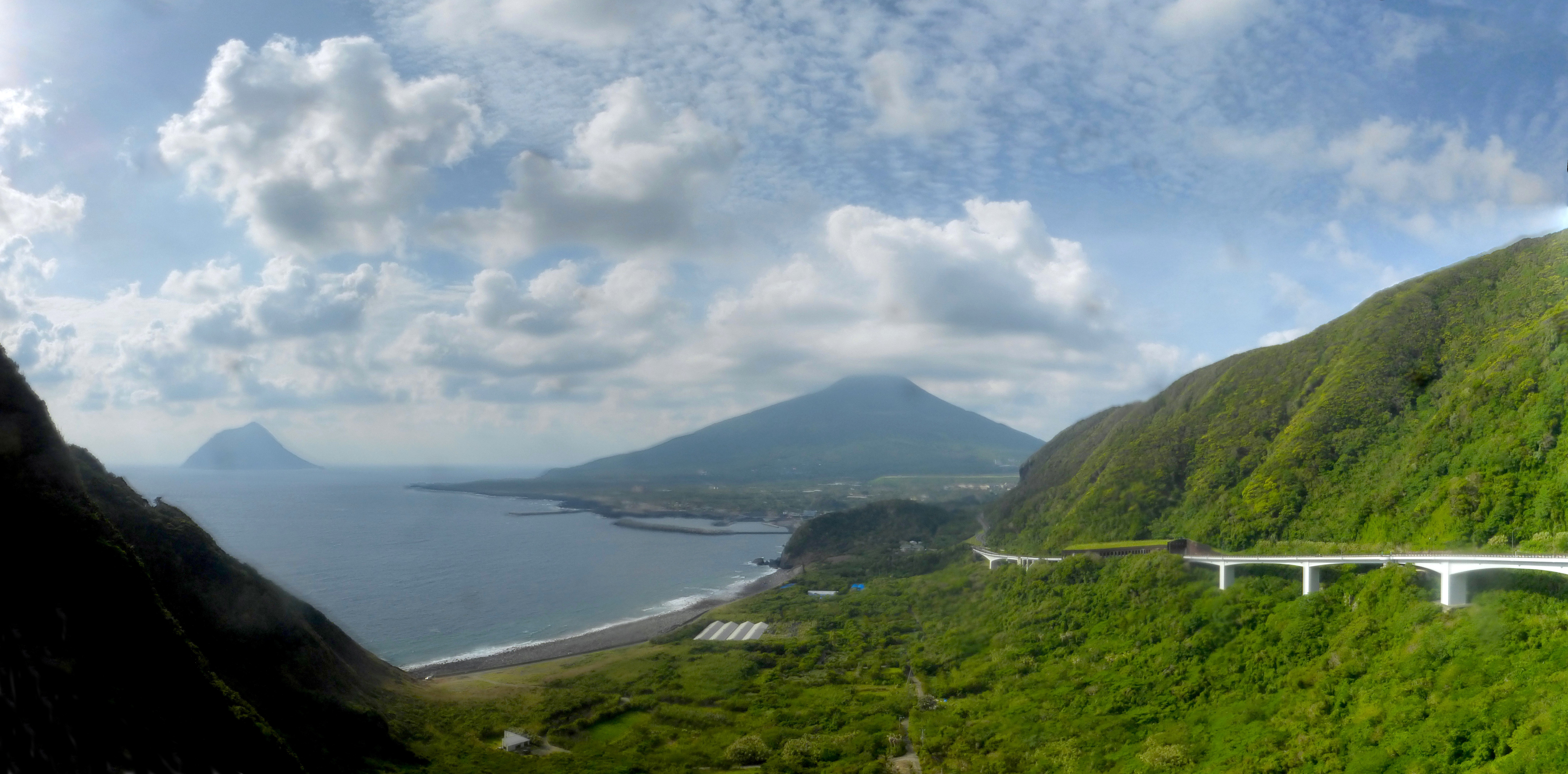
- Hachijō-fuji and the smaller island of Hachijō-kojima (left) as seen from Osaka Tunnel, 2018

- Location within Japan

Geography
- Location: Izu Islands
- Coordinates: 33°06′34″N 139°47′29″E
- Archipelago: Izu Islands
- Area: 62.52 km^{2} (24.14 sq mi)
- Length: 14 km (8.7 mi)
- Width: 7.5 km (4.66 mi)
- Coastline: 58.91 km (36.605 mi)
- Highest elevation: 854.3 m (2802.8 ft)

Administration
- Japan
- Prefecture: Tokyo
- Subprefecture: Hachijō Subprefecture
- Town: Hachijō

Demographics
- Population: 7522 (March 2018)

Hachijō-jima (Japanese: 八丈島) is a volcanic island of Japan in the Pacific Ocean. It is about 287 km (178 mi) south of the special wards of Tokyo. It is part of the Izu archipelago and within the Fuji-Hakone-Izu National Park. Its only municipality is Hachijō. On 1 March 2018, its population was 7,522 people living on 63 km^{2}. Some inhabitants speak the Hachijō language, which is considered an endangered language and the number of speakers is unknown. The island has been inhabited since the Jōmon period, and was used as a place of exile during the Edo period. In modern times, it has been used for farming sugarcane and housing a secret submarine base during World War II; it is now a tourist destination within Japan.

Hachijō-jima receives about 3,000 mm (120 in) of precipitation annually. With a humid subtropical climate, and an average high temperature of 21 °C (70 °F), the island and the surrounding ocean support a wide variety of sea life, birds, mammals, plants, and other life. The tallest peak within the Izu Islands, a Class-C active volcano, is located there. Transportation to the island is either by air or ferry. There are many Japanese-style inns, hot spring resorts, and hotels to accommodate tourists and visitors. The island is a popular destination for surfers, divers and hikers. It has several local variations on Japanese foods, including shimazushi and kusaya, as well as many dishes that include the local plant ashitaba.

== Geography ==
=== Location ===
Hachijō-jima is about 200 km (120 mi) south of the Izu Peninsula—or about 287 km (178 mi) south of Tokyo—in the Pacific Ocean. The smaller island of Hachijō-kojima is 7.5 km (4.7 mi) northwest of Hachijō-jima, and can be seen from the top of Nishiyama. Mikura-jima about 79 km (49 mi) to the north and Aogashima about 64 km (40 mi) to the south. The island is within the boundaries of Fuji-Hakone-Izu National Park.

=== Municipalities ===
The only municipality on the island is the town of Hachijō, which encompasses both Hachijō-jima and the neighbouring Hachijō-kojima, though no one lives on the latter. The town is divided into five areas: Mitsune (三根), Nakanogo (中之郷), Kashitate (樫立), Sueyoshi (末吉), and Ōkago (大賀郷).

=== Population ===
The population of Hachijō-jima on 1 March 2018 was 7,522.

Comparison of Population Distribution between Hachijō-jima and Japanese National Average
Population Distribution by Age and Sex in Hachijō-jima
■ Hachijō-jima
■ Japan (average)
■ Male
■ Female

1970	10,316
1975	10,318
1980	10,244
1985	10,024
1990	9,420
1995	9,476
2000	9,488
2005	8,837
2010	8,231
2015	7,613

2015 Census, Ministry of Internal Affairs and Communications - Statistics Department

=== Language ===
The language spoken historically on Hachijō-jima is one of the most divergent forms of Japanese; it is the only surviving descendant of Eastern Old Japanese. The number of speakers is not certain; it is on UNESCO's list of endangered languages, and is likely to be extinct by 2050 if counter-measures are not taken.

=== Funga, flora, and fauna ===
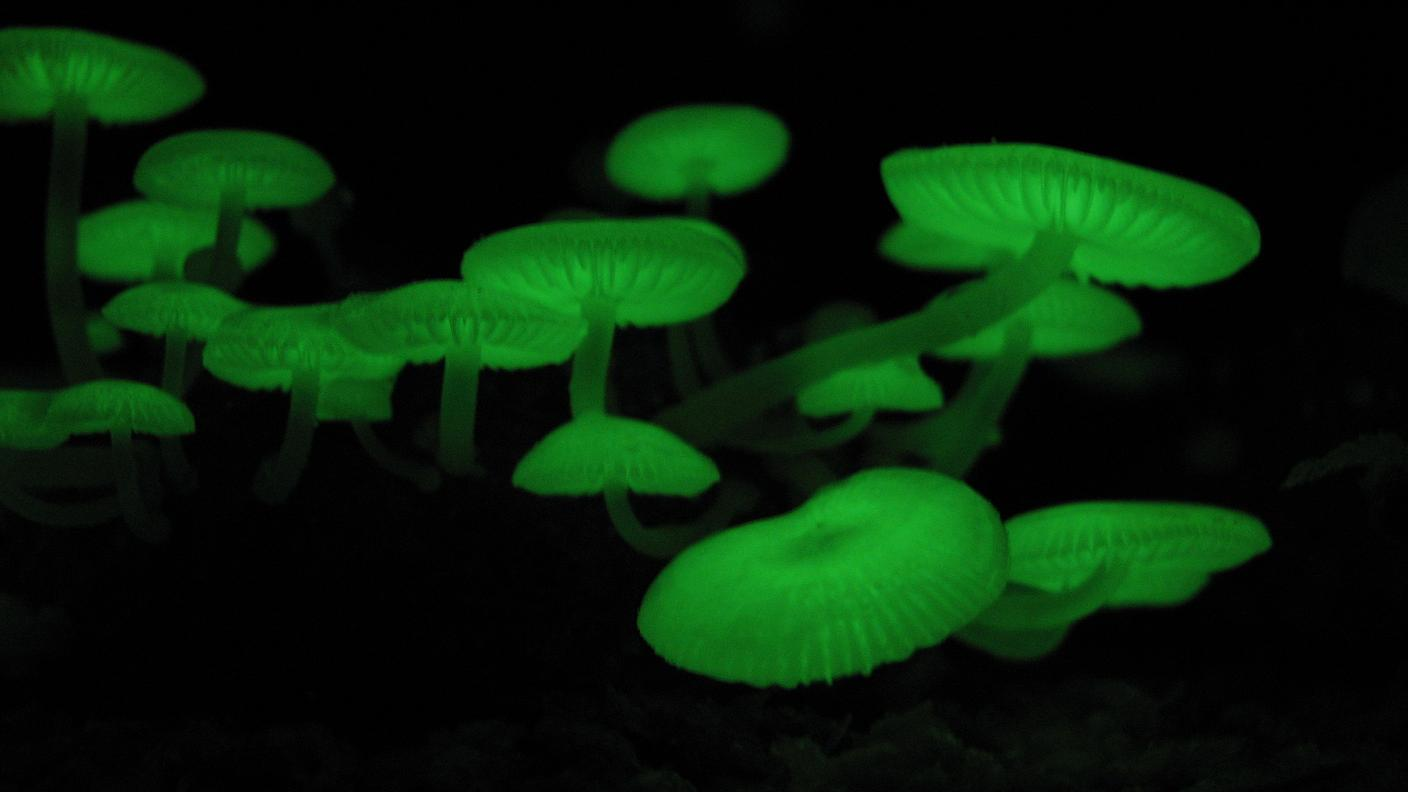
Bioluminescent M. chlorophos mushrooms in Hachijō-jima botanical park

The island is home to bioluminescent mushrooms, including Mycena lux-coeli—meaning "heavenly light mushrooms"—and Mycena chlorophos. M. lux-coeli are widely found and for decades were believed only to exist on the island. The local name for the mushrooms is hato-no-hi, literally "pigeon fire". Many different plants are native to the island, including the pygmy date palm, aloe, freesia, hydrangea, hibiscus, Oshima and Japanese cherry, and bird of paradise.

Since November 2015, humpback whales have been observed gathering around the island, far north from their known breeding areas in the Bonin Islands. All breeding activities except for giving births have been confirmed, and research is underway by the town of Hachijō and the Tokyo University of Marine Science and Technology to determine whether Hachijō-jima may become the northernmost breeding ground in the world, and possible expectations for opening a future tourism attraction. Whales can be viewed even from hot springs. Indo-Pacific bottlenose dolphins, likely (re)colonised from Mikura-jima, also live around the island, among other cetaceans such as false killer whales, sperm whales, and orcas (being sighted during humpback whale research in 2017).

The waters around the island are important for the nourishment of green sea turtles, as well as Hamatobiuo (a type of flying fish).

The Izu thrush makes its home on the island, as does the Japanese white-eye. The island has been recognised as an Important Bird Area (IBA) by BirdLife International because it also supports populations of Japanese wood pigeons, Japanese murrelets, Pleske's grasshopper warblers and Ijima's leaf-warblers.

=== Climate ===
Hachijō-jima has a humid subtropical climate (Köppen climate classification Cfa) with very warm summers and mild winters. Precipitation is abundant throughout the year, but is somewhat lower in winter.

Climate data for Hachijō-jima (1991−2020 normals, extremes 1906−present)
Month	Jan	Feb	Mar	Apr	May	Jun	Jul	Aug	Sep	Oct	Nov	Dec	Year
Record high °C (°F)	21.5 (70.7)	21.9 (71.4)	22.7 (72.9)	26.3 (79.3)	27.4 (81.3)	30.4 (86.7)	35.5 (95.9)	34.8 (94.6)	33.2 (91.8)	31.0 (87.8)	26.4 (79.5)	24.6 (76.3)	35.5 (95.9)
Mean maximum °C (°F)	18.5 (65.3)	18.9 (66.0)	20.3 (68.5)	22.9 (73.2)	25.6 (78.1)	28.0 (82.4)	30.9 (87.6)	31.7 (89.1)	30.9 (87.6)	28.0 (82.4)	24.4 (75.9)	20.8 (69.4)	32.0 (89.6)
Mean daily maximum °C (°F)	12.9 (55.2)	13.5 (56.3)	15.8 (60.4)	18.9 (66.0)	21.8 (71.2)	24.1 (75.4)	27.7 (81.9)	29.6 (85.3)	27.6 (81.7)	23.8 (74.8)	20.0 (68.0)	15.6 (60.1)	20.9 (69.6)
Daily mean °C (°F)	10.1 (50.2)	10.4 (50.7)	12.5 (54.5)	15.8 (60.4)	18.8 (65.8)	21.3 (70.3)	25.2 (77.4)	26.5 (79.7)	24.5 (76.1)	21.0 (69.8)	16.9 (62.4)	12.7 (54.9)	18.0 (64.4)
Mean daily minimum °C (°F)	7.6 (45.7)	7.5 (45.5)	9.3 (48.7)	12.9 (55.2)	16.2 (61.2)	19.4 (66.9)	23.3 (73.9)	24.3 (75.7)	22.3 (72.1)	18.7 (65.7)	14.2 (57.6)	9.9 (49.8)	15.5 (59.9)
Mean minimum °C (°F)	3.0 (37.4)	3.2 (37.8)	4.7 (40.5)	7.8 (46.0)	12.5 (54.5)	16.2 (61.2)	20.4 (68.7)	21.6 (70.9)	18.7 (65.7)	14.7 (58.5)	10.1 (50.2)	6.3 (43.3)	2.0 (35.6)
Record low °C (°F)	−1.8 (28.8)	−2.0 (28.4)	0.0 (32.0)	4.5 (40.1)	8.3 (46.9)	11.5 (52.7)	15.6 (60.1)	16.7 (62.1)	14.7 (58.5)	10.4 (50.7)	5.9 (42.6)	0.3 (32.5)	−2.0 (28.4)
Average precipitation mm (inches)	201.7 (7.94)	205.5 (8.09)	296.5 (11.67)	215.2 (8.47)	256.7 (10.11)	390.3 (15.37)	254.1 (10.00)	169.5 (6.67)	360.5 (14.19)	479.1 (18.86)	277.4 (10.92)	200.2 (7.88)	3,306.7 (130.17)
Average precipitation days (≥ 1.0 mm)	14.1	13.7	16.3	12.9	12.7	15.3	10.5	10.8	15.0	16.5	14.0	14.3	166.1
Average relative humidity (%)	68	69	71	77	84	91	92	87	86	82	74	69	79
Mean monthly sunshine hours	84.9	87.8	124.5	139.4	148.5	87.1	137.3	185.9	139.6	107.1	102.6	100.4	1,445.1
Source: Japan Meteorological Agency

See or edit raw graph data.

== Geology ==
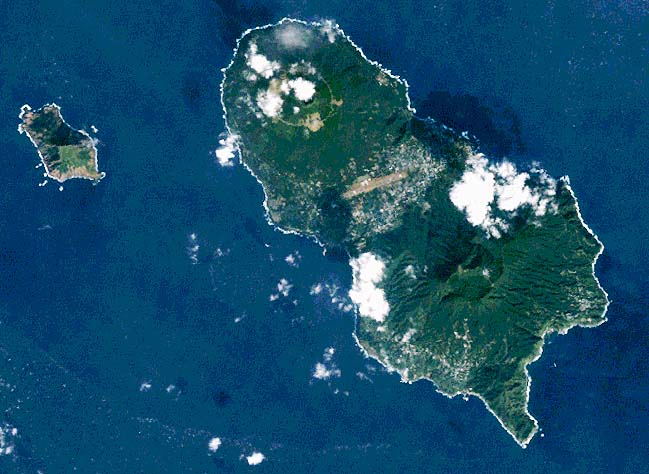
Hachijō-jima (right) and Hachijō-kojima (left)

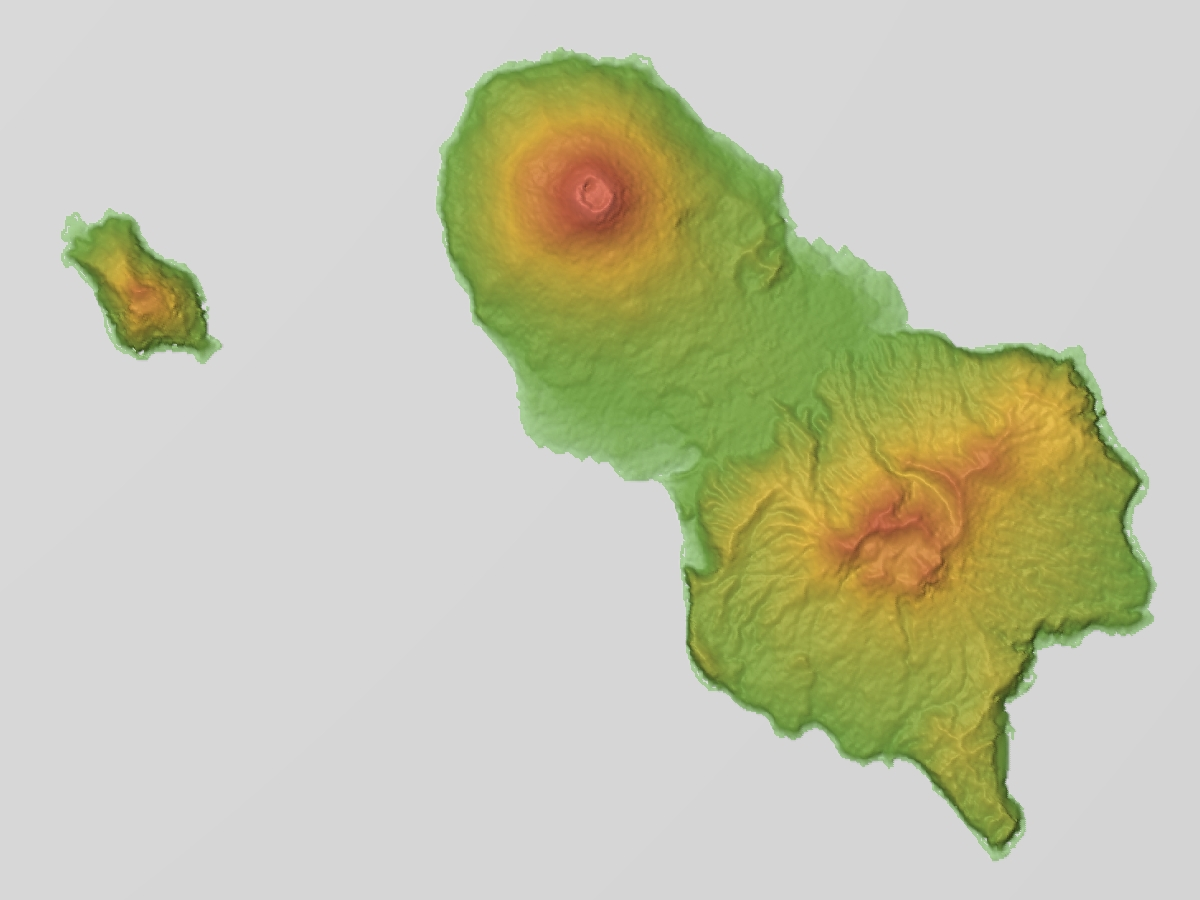
Relief map

Hachijō-jima is a compound volcanic island that is 14.5 kilometres (9 miles) in length with a maximum width of 8 kilometres (5 miles). The island is formed from two stratovolcanoes. Higashi-yama (東山)—also called Mihara-yama (三原山)—has a height of 701 m (2,300 ft) and was active from 100,000 BC to around 1700 BC. It has eroded flanks and retains a distinctive caldera.

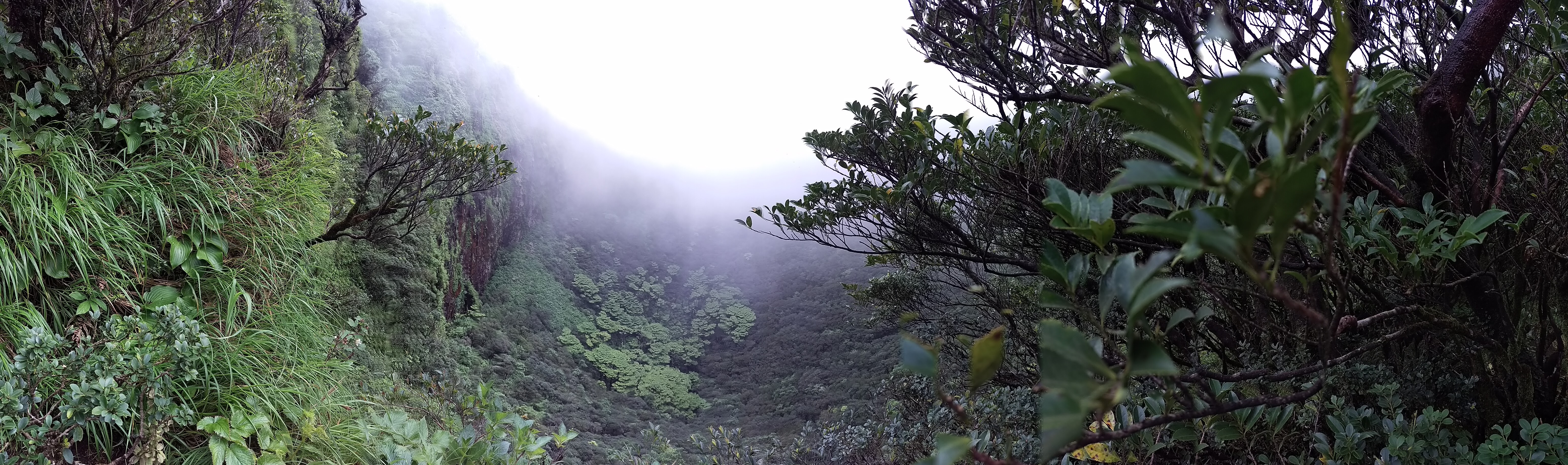
A view from inside the crater of Nishi-yama, Hachijō-jima

Nishi-yama (西山)—also called Hachijō-fuji (八丈富士)—has a height of 854.3 m (2,803 ft). It is the highest point on the island and the tallest peak in the Izu island chain. The summit is occupied by a shallow caldera with a diameter of 400 metres (1,300 feet) and a depth of around 50 metres (160 feet). It is rated as a Class-C active volcano by the Japan Meteorological Agency with recent eruptions recorded in 1487, 1518–1523, and 1605, with seismic activity as recently as 2002. Between these two peaks are over 20 flank volcanoes and pyroclastic cones.

== History ==
Hachijō-jima has been inhabited since at least the Jōmon period, and archaeologists have found magatama and other remains. Under the Ritsuryō system of the early Nara period, the island was part of Suruga Province. It was transferred to Izu Province when Izu separated from Suruga in 680. During the Heian period, Minamoto no Tametomo was banished to Izu Ōshima after a failed rebellion, but per a semi-legendary story, escaped to Hachijō-jima, where he attempted to establish an independent kingdom.

During the Edo period, the island became known as a place of exile for convicts, most notably Ukita Hideie, a daimyō who was defeated at the Battle of Sekigahara. Originally the island was a place of exile mainly for political figures, but beginning in 1704 the criteria for banishment were broadened. Crimes punishable by banishment included murder, theft, arson, brawling, gambling, fraud, jailbreak, rape, and membership of an outlawed religious group. Criminals exiled to the island were never told the length of their sentences, and the history of the island is filled with foiled escape attempts. Its use as a prison island ended during the Meiji Restoration: after a general amnesty in 1868 most of the island's residents chose to move to the mainland; however, the policy of banishment was not officially abolished until 1881.

Former U.S. president Ulysses S. Grant visited the island during his 1877 world tour. The island's residents were aware of his exploits in the American Civil War and gave him a jubilant welcome. He was ceremonially adopted by the village chief, being given the name Yūtarotaishō; meaning "courageous general" in the local dialect, and was presented with prayer beads made with pearls and gemstones. He declared that the island's residents were the "friendliest people in the Pacific".

In 1900, pioneers from Hachijō became the first inhabitants of the Daitō Islands, where they established a sugarcane farming industry. The Hachijō language is still spoken on the islands to this day.

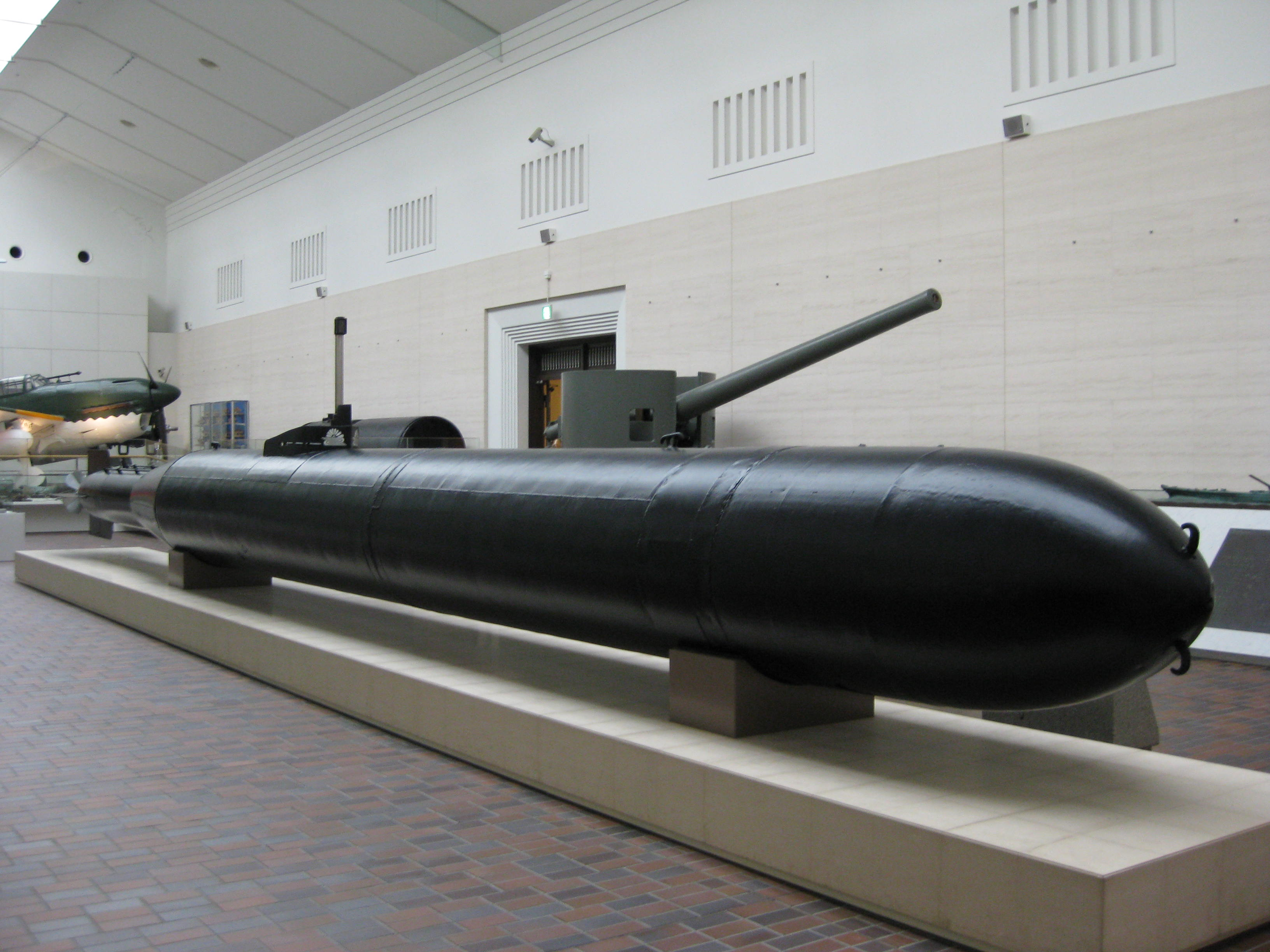
Kaiten Type 1 suicide submarine used during World War II

During World War II, the island was regarded as a strategic point in the defense of the ocean approaches to Tokyo; and in the final stages of the war, a base of operations for the Kaiten suicide submarines was founded on the southern coast. From the end of the war through the 1960s, the government made attempts to promote Hachijō-jima as the "Hawaii of Japan" to encourage tourist development, and tourism remains a large component of the island's economy.

== Transportation ==
Hachijō-jima is accessible both by aircraft and by ferry. In 2010 a pedestrian ferry would leave Tōkyō once every day at 10:30 pm, and arrive at Hachijō-jima at 8:50 am the following day. Air travel to Hachijojima Airport takes 45 minutes from Tōkyō International Airport (Haneda). In 2000, there were three metropolitan roads on Hachijō-jima: 215 (formally, 東京都道215号八丈循環線), 216 (都道216号神湊八重根港線, 8.3 km), and 217 (東京都道217号汐間洞輪沢港線).

== Tourism ==
=== Notable landmarks ===
The island is home to the Hachijo Royal Resort, a now-abandoned French baroque-style luxury hotel that was built during the tourism boom of the 1960s. When the hotel was built in 1963 it was one of the largest in Japan, and attracted visitors from all over the country. The hotel was finally closed in 2006 due to declining tourism to the island. As of April 2016, the grounds were overgrown and the building severely dilapidated.

The Hachijō-jima History and Folk Museum (八丈島歴史民俗資料館, Hachijō-jima Rekishi Minzoku Shiryōkan) contains displays covering the history of the island, local industries, as well as the animals and plants found on and around the island. The Hachijō Botanical Park (八丈植物公園, Hachijō Shokubutsu Kōen) is a botanical and animal park next to the Hachijojima Visitors Center.

=== Activities and accommodation ===
In 2005, accommodation on Hachijō-jima was plentiful, with many Japanese-style inns, hot spring resorts, campsites, and several larger hotels. Hachijō-jima is popular with surfers, with three reef breaks and consistently warmer water than mainland Japan because of the Kuroshio Current. Because Hachijō-jima is a volcanic island, there are several black sandy beaches, including one next to the main harbour of Sokodo.

Hachijō-jima's scuba diving points were regarded in 2008 as many and varied, and as including one of the top five diving spots in Japan.

Hachijō-jima is known for its hiking trails, waterfalls, and natural environment. Other activities for visitors include visiting the Botanical Park, exploring wartime tunnels, and hiking to the top of Hachijō-fuji.

Kihachijō, a naturally yellow silk fabric, is woven on the island. One of the workshops is open to tourists. The Tokyo Electric Power Company operates a free museum at its geothermal power plant.

=== Food ===
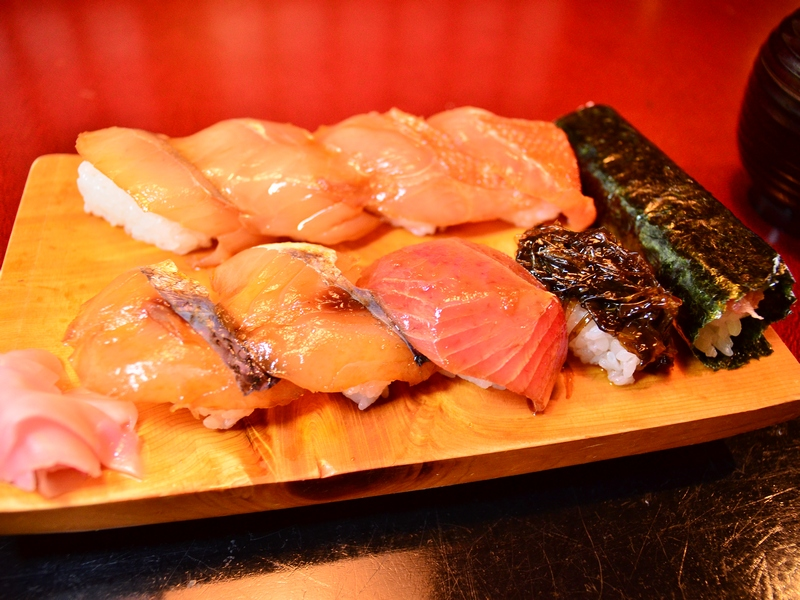
Shimazushi, a local specialty

Hachijō-jima is famous both for its sushi—known locally as shimazushi—and for its kusaya (a dried and fermented version of hamatobiuo). As well as being served with sake, the latter is used in many different recipes.

Local cuisine also makes use of the ashitaba plant in dishes such as ashitaba soba and tempura.

== In popular culture ==
The island is the main setting of the film Bento Harassment, released in 2019 and starring Ryoko Shinohara and Kyoko Yoshine.

== Gallery ==
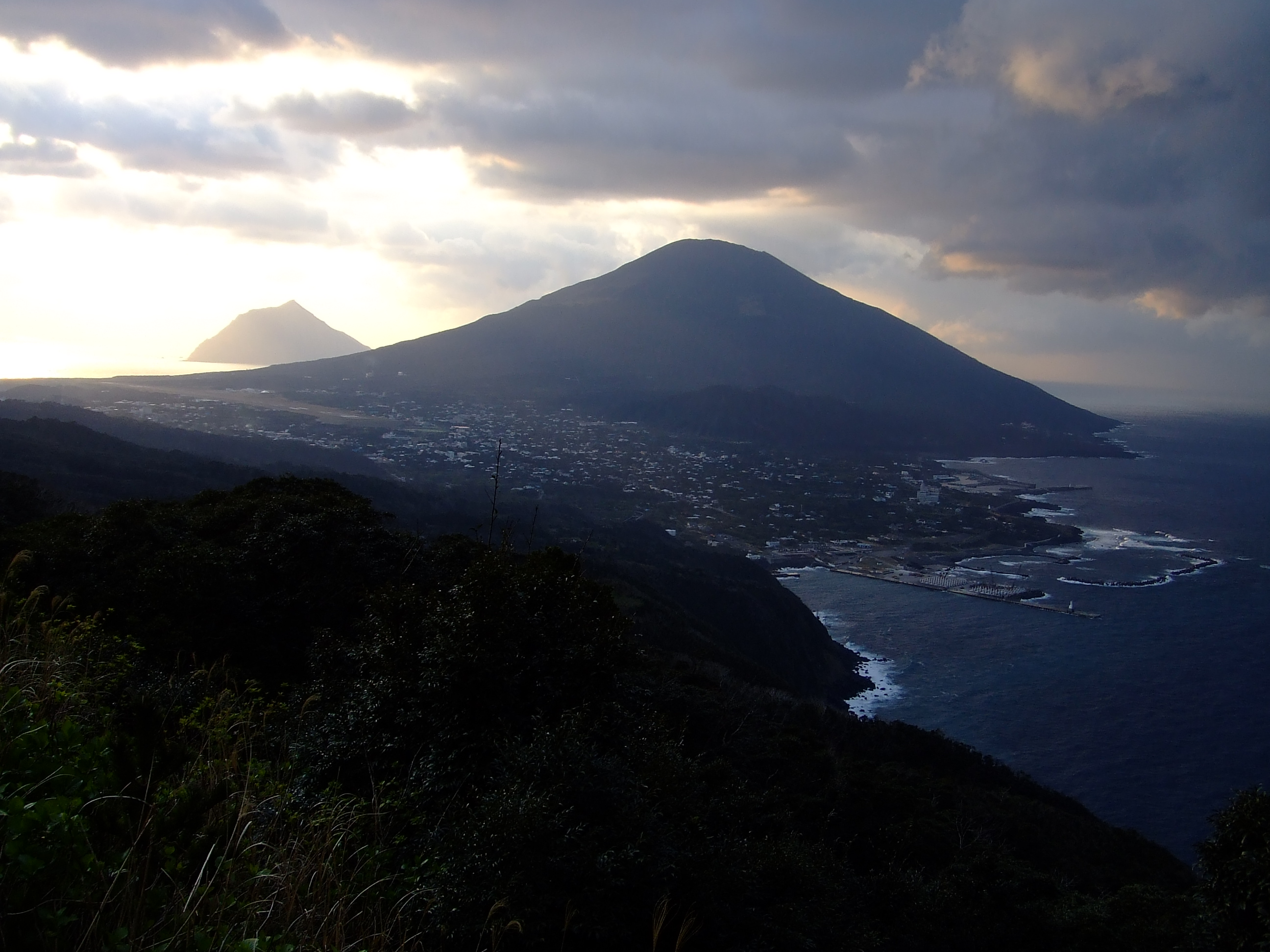
Mt Hachijō-Fuji and Hachijō-Kojima island seen from the Noboryō Pass

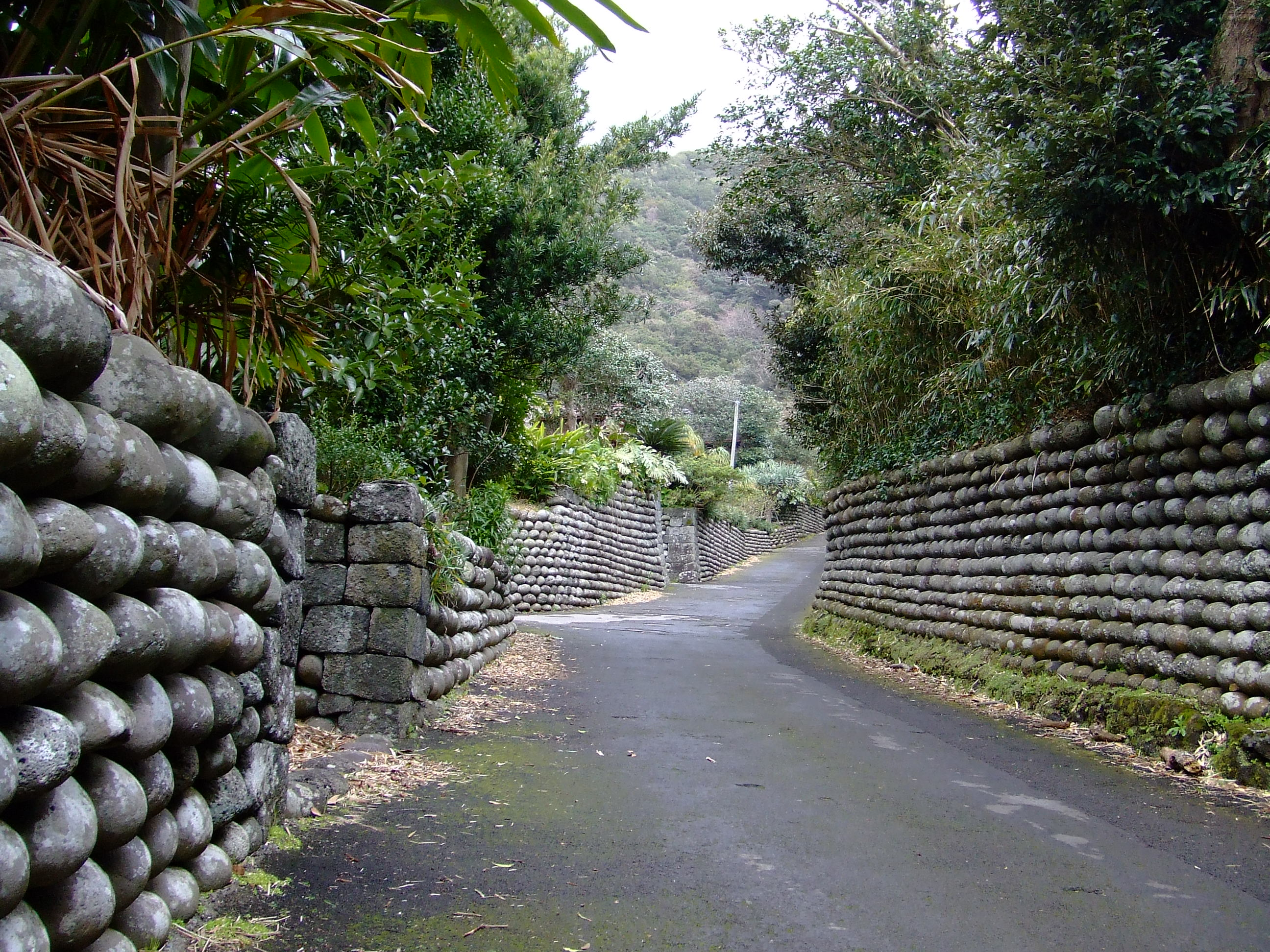
Tamaishigaki: walls built by convicts exiled on Hachijō-jima in the Edo Period

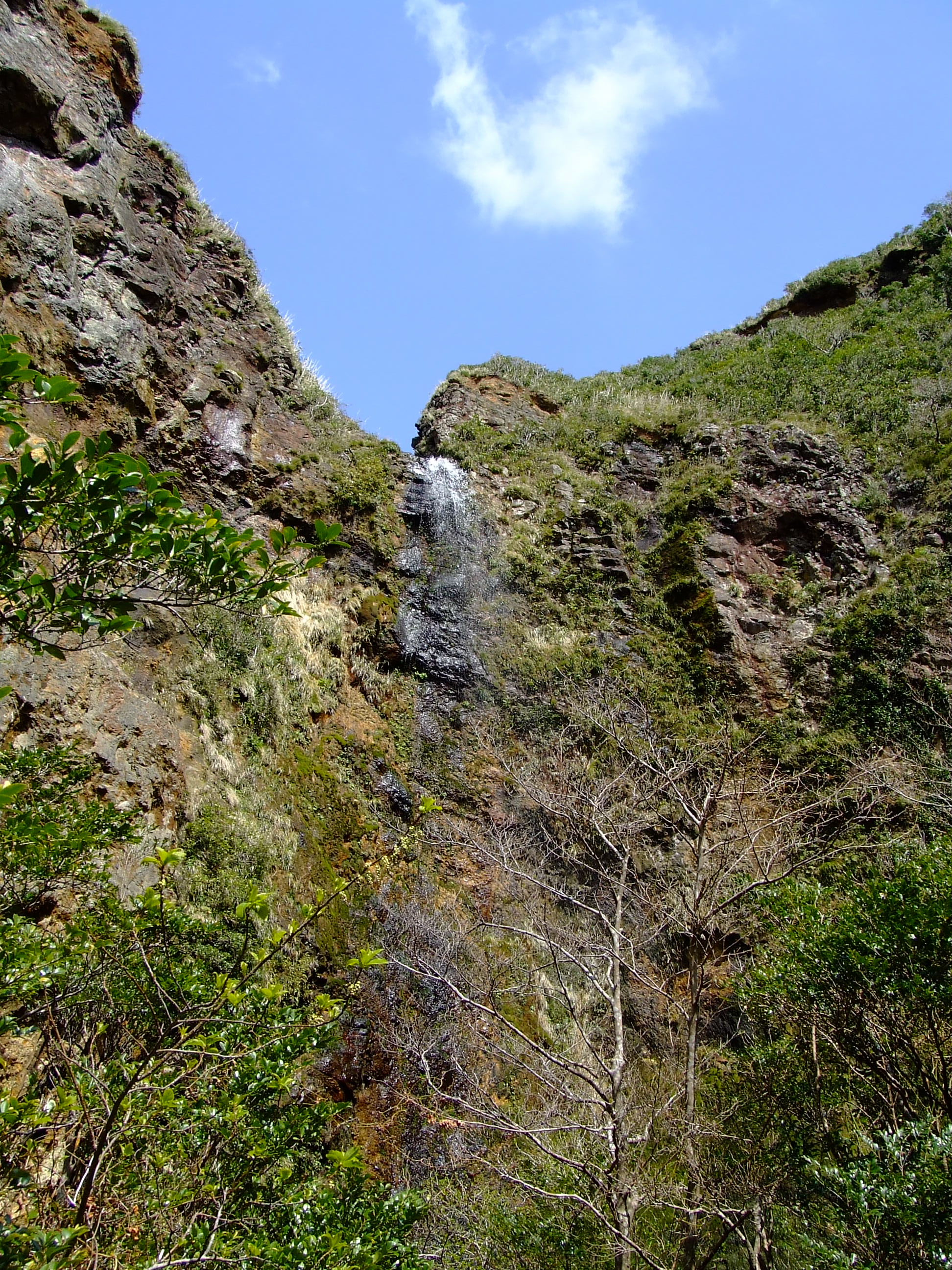
The Karataki waterfall, in the hills around Mt. Mihara

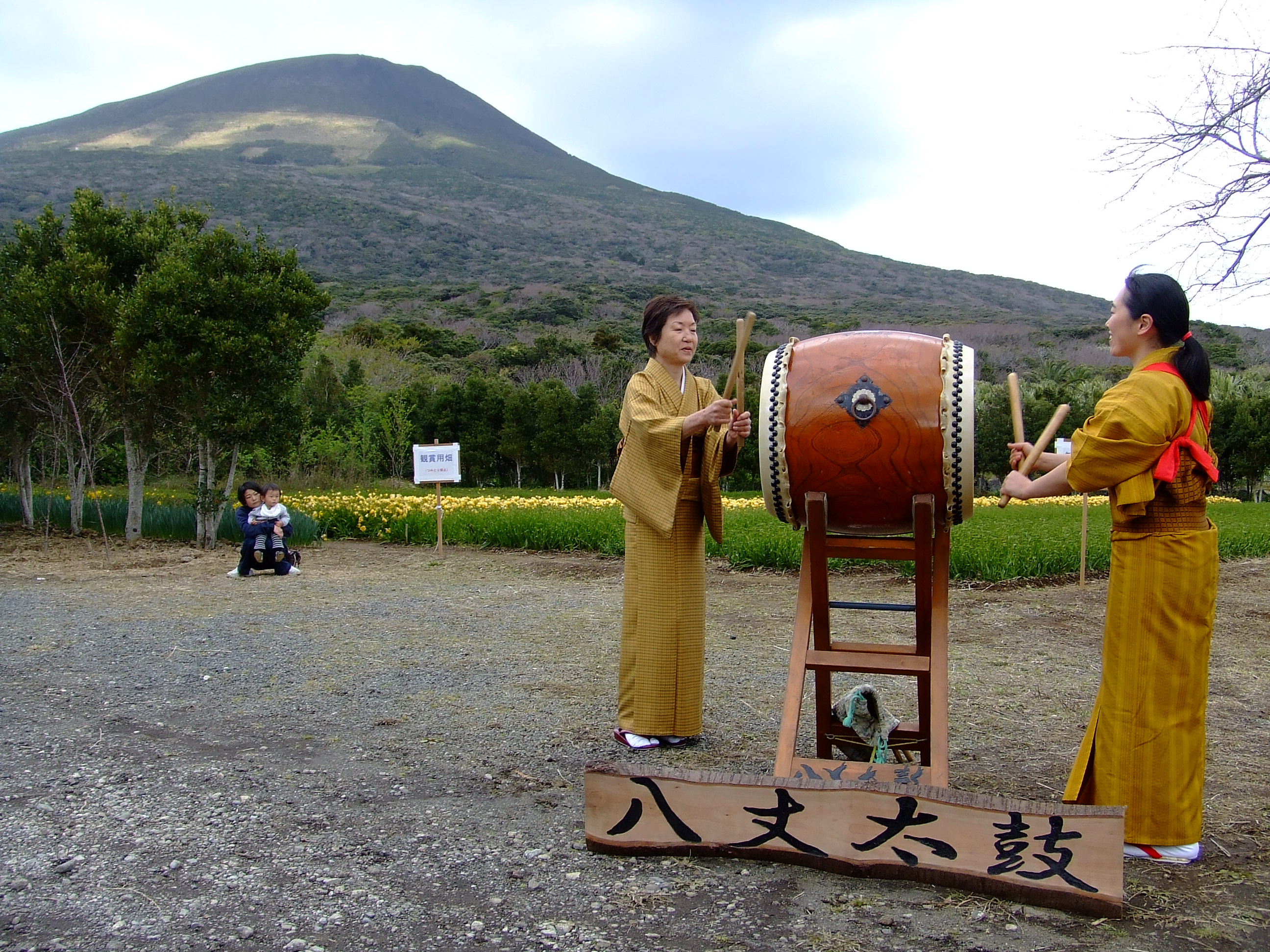
Taiko drummers wearing kimono made from kihachijō cloth

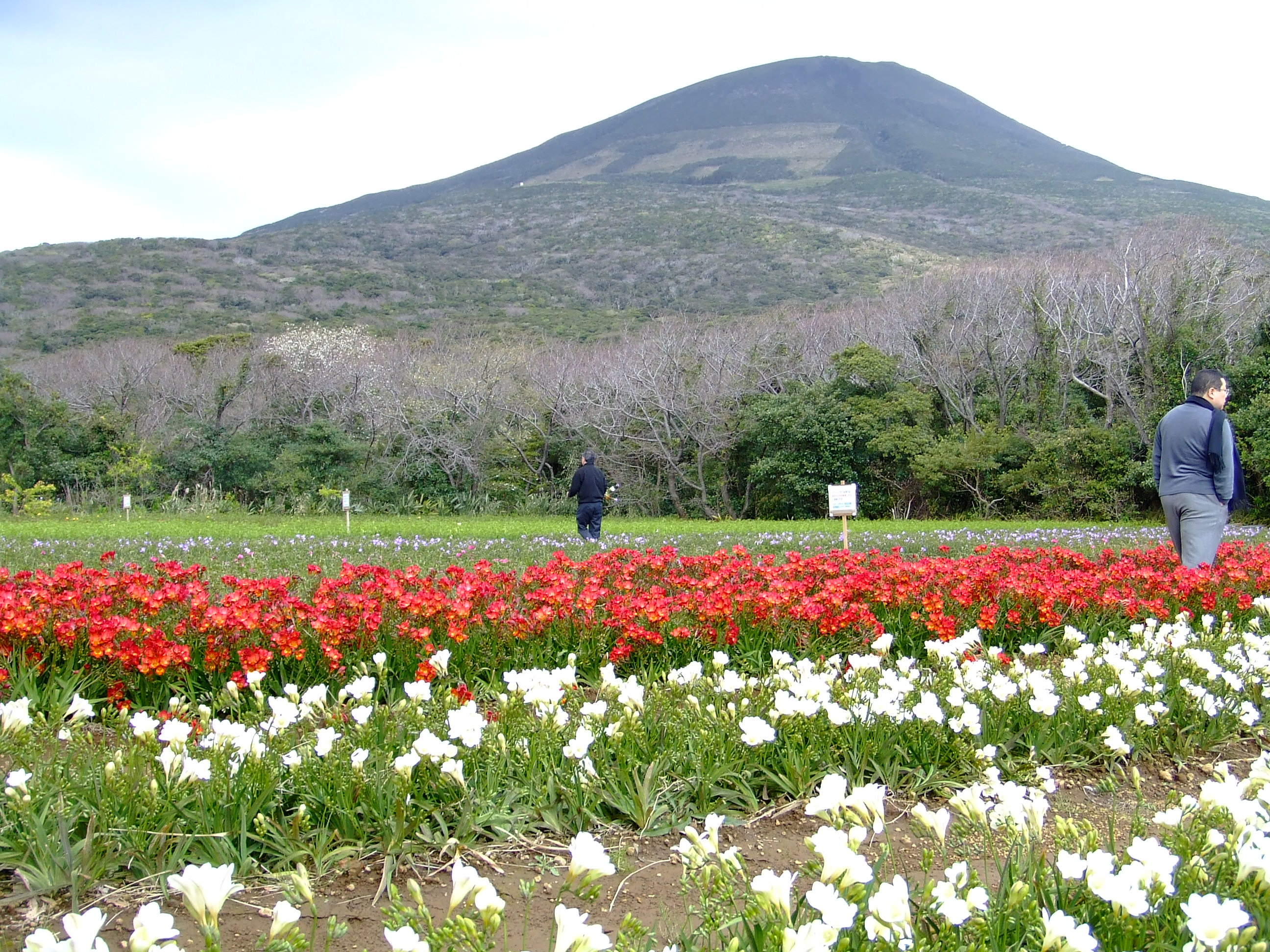
Freesia Festival

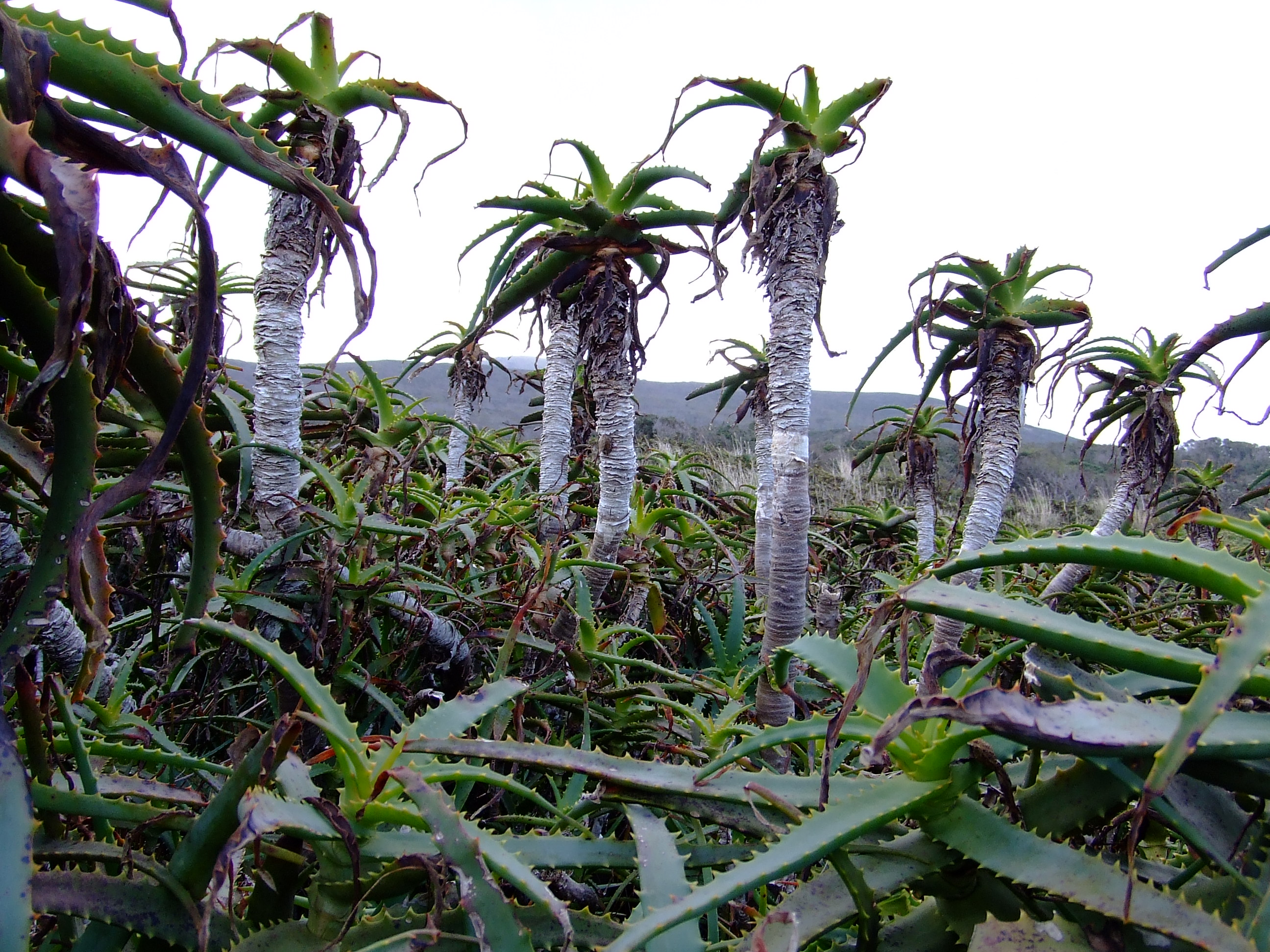
Aloe growing on Mt. Hachijō-Fuji

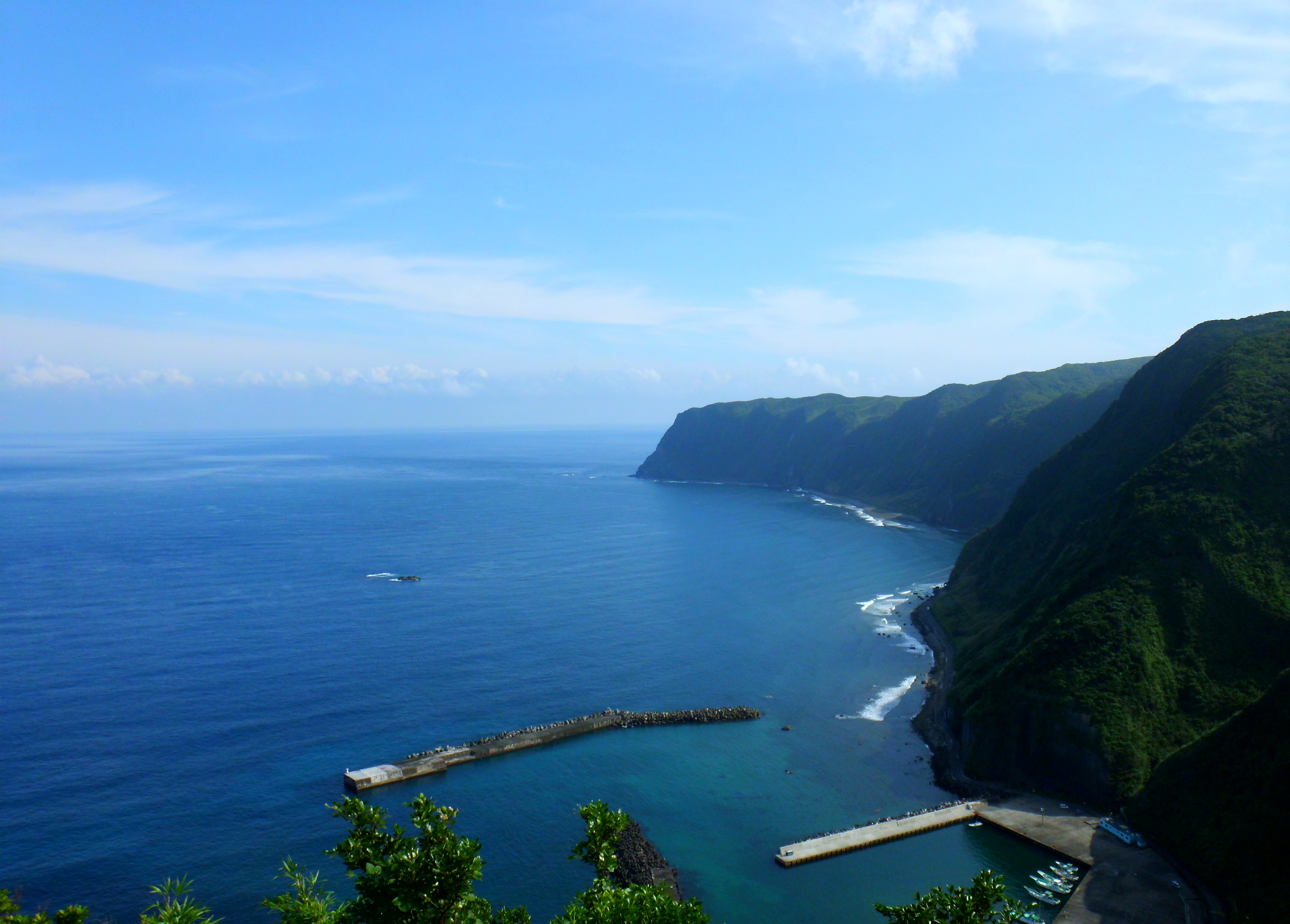
Hachijō-jima view

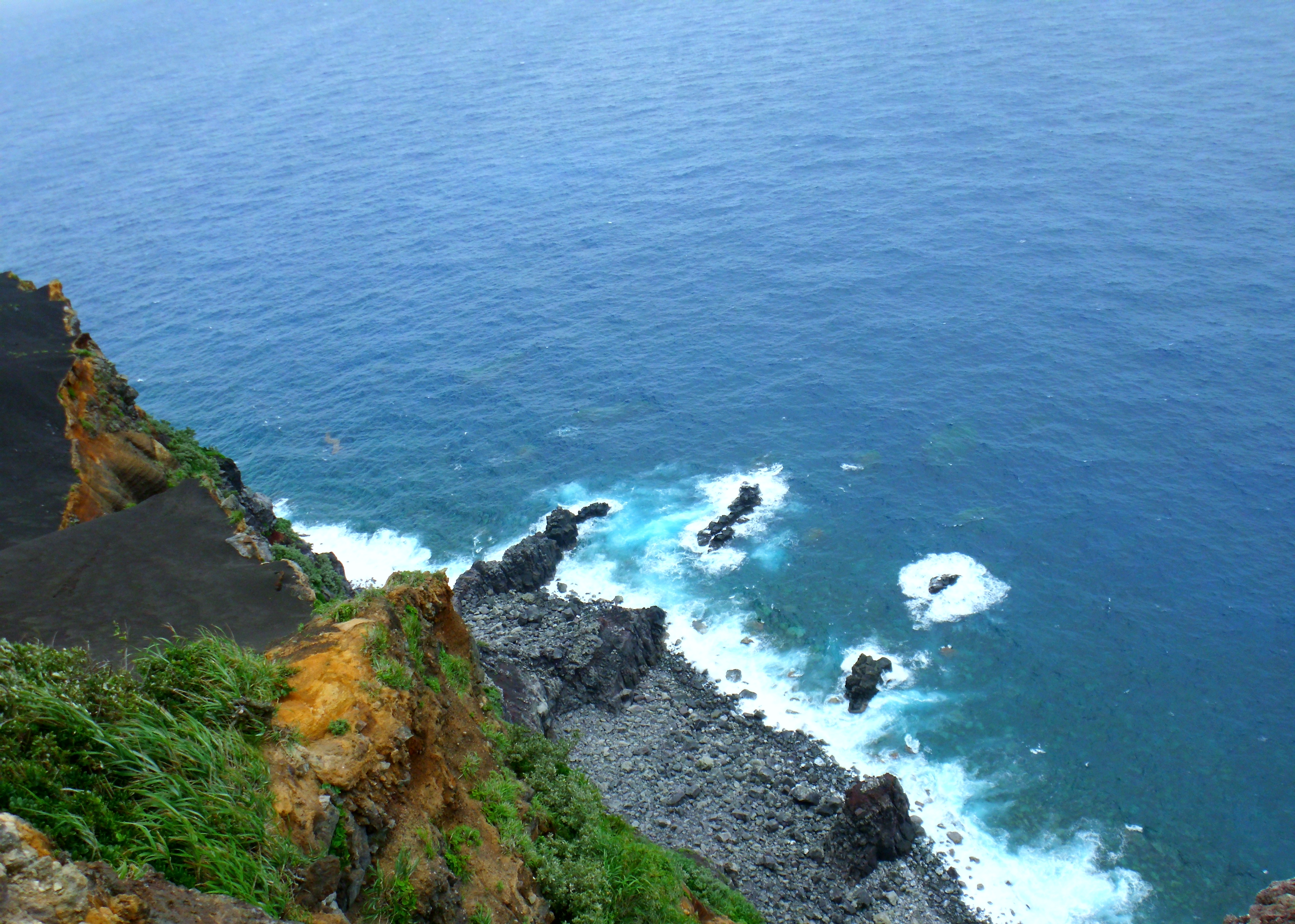
View from the top of the rock at Kurosuna, Hachijō

== See also ==
- Runin: Banished, a 2004 film about convicts exiled to Hachijō-jima and their attempts to escape
- Battle Royale, a 2000 film filmed on the neighbouring, uninhabited, Hachijō Kojima, although not set on the island
- List of islands of Japan
