= Australasian flying fish =

Scientific classification
- Kingdom: Animalia
- Phylum: Chordata
- Class: Actinopterygii
- Order: Beloniformes
- Family: Exocoetidae
- Genus: Cheilopogon
- Species: C. pinnatibarbatus
- Subspecies: C. p. melanocercus

Trinomial name
- Cheilopogon pinnatibarbatus melanocercus (J. D. Ogilby, 1885)

Subspecies of fish

The Australasian flying fish (Cheilopogon pinnatibarbatus melanocercus) is a subspecies of flyingfish of the family Exocoetidae, found off New South Wales of Australia, and around New Zealand, in surface waters. The Australasian flying fish feeds mainly on plankton and small crustaceans.
