= Tetramerium nervosum =

Scientific classification
- Kingdom: Plantae
- Clade: Embryophytes
- Clade: Tracheophytes
- Clade: Angiosperms
- Clade: Eudicots
- Clade: Asterids
- Order: Lamiales
- Family: Acanthaceae
- Genus: Tetramerium
- Species: T. nervosum

Binomial name
- Tetramerium nervosum Nees

Synonyms
- List: Blechum angustius Nees; Blechum sternbergii Nees; Dianthera sonorae S.Watson; Justicia nemorosa Bertero ex Nees; Justicia papilionacea Sessé & Moc.; Tetramerium angustius (Nees) T.F.Daniel; Tetramerium calderonii Happ; Tetramerium hispidum Nees; Tetramerium hispidum var. greenmanii Happ; Tetramerium nervosum var. angustifolium Nees; Tetramerium nervosum var. hispidum Torr.; Tetramerium ovalifolium Oerst.; Tetramerium ovatum Oerst.; Tetramerium polystachyum Nees; Tetramerium scabrum Torr. ex Happ; Tetramerium standleyi Happ

Species of flowering plant

Tetramerium nervosum is a plant in the Acanthaceae family. It grows from Arizona to Texas, Central America, and southern South America.
