= Carlowrightia ecuadoriana =

Conservation status
- Critically Endangered (IUCN 3.1)

Scientific classification
- Kingdom: Plantae
- Clade: Tracheophytes
- Clade: Angiosperms
- Clade: Eudicots
- Clade: Asterids
- Order: Lamiales
- Family: Acanthaceae
- Genus: Carlowrightia
- Species: C. ecuadoriana

Binomial name
- Carlowrightia ecuadoriana T.F.Daniel & Wassh.

Species of flowering plant

Carlowrightia ecuadoriana is a species of plant in the family Acanthaceae. It is endemic to Ecuador. Its natural habitat is subtropical or tropical dry forests.
