= Gaillardia henricksonii =

Scientific classification
- Kingdom: Plantae
- Clade: Tracheophytes
- Clade: Angiosperms
- Clade: Eudicots
- Clade: Asterids
- Order: Asterales
- Family: Asteraceae
- Genus: Gaillardia
- Species: G. henricksonii

Binomial name
- Gaillardia henricksonii B.L.Turner

Species of flowering plant

Gaillardia henricksonii is a Mexican species of flowering plants in the sunflower family. It is native to northwestern Mexico, found only in the State of Coahuila.

Gaillardia henricksonii grows in soil derived from gypsum. It is a perennial herb up to 20 cm (7.9 in) tall, with a large taproot and leaves on the stem rather than clumped at the base. Leaves are long and narrow, up to 5 cm (2.0 in) long, covered with woolly hairs. Each flower head is about 1.5 cm (0.59 in) wide. Each head has 8 salmon-colored ray flowers surrounding 60-80 reddish or brownish disc flowers.

It is named for American botanist James Solberg Henrickson. It was first published in Wrightia 5(8): 305–307, f. 41. 1976.
