= Thomas Franklin Daniel =

American botanist, and teacher

- Born: September 14, 1954
- Education: Duke University; University of Michigan
- Scientific career
- Workplaces: California Academy of Sciences, Arizona State University

Thomas Franklin Daniel (born September 14, 1954) is an American botanist and teacher who specializes in the botanical family Acanthaceae.

== Education ==
In 1975 he obtained his undergraduate from Duke University. In 1980, he obtained his doctorate at the University of Michigan.

== Career ==
In 1981, he was assistant professor. Between 1981 and 1985 he was an assistant curator of the Arizona State University Herbarium.

Since 1986, Daniel belongs to the California Academy of Sciences where he is Curator of Botany, Emeritus. In 1987 he was a conservation assistant. From 1988 to 1991: assistant curator. In 2009, he was president of the Botany Department, a position he also held between 1988 and 1990 and between 1994 and 1996. Since 1998 he has been a research professor at San Francisco State University. He is also a researcher at the Arizona-Sonora Desert Museum.

== Selected publications ==
=== Books ===
- Darrell Ubick; Thomas S. Briggs; Thomas F. Daniel; John E. McCosker; Tommy Iwamoto; Alexei Orlov; Ken J. Graham; Peter W. Fritsch (2008). The Harvestman Family Phalangodidae. 6: revision of the Sitalcina complex (Opiates: Laniatores). Vol. 59. Proc. Of the Cal. Acad. Of Sci. Ed. California Academy of Sci. 305 pages.
- Thomas F. Daniel; Kevin Balkwill; Mandy-Jane Balkwill (2000). Chromosome Numbers of South African Acanthaceae. Ed. California Academy of Sci. 16 pages.
- 1999. Flora of the Tehuacán-Cuicatlán Valley: fasciculo 23. Acanthaceae Juss. Ed. UNAM. 102 pp. ISBN 9683670695 online
- 1986. Systematics of Tetramerium (Acanthaceae) . Volume 12 of Systematic botany monographs. Ed. Am. Soc. Of Plant Taxonomists. 134 pp. ISBN 0912861126
- 1983. Carlowrightia (Acanthaceae) . No. 34 of Neotropical Flora. Ed. New York Botanical Garden. 116 pp. ISBN 0893272469
- 1980. A systematic study of the genus Carlowrightia (Acanthaceae) . Ed. The University Of Michigan. 393 pp.

== Honors ==
- Member of the American Society of Plant Taxonomists, 2001 and 2002, President
- Member of the Botanical Society of California, Treasurer from 1986 to 1989
- Since 2003, fund manager of the Stanley Smith Horticultural Trust
- Member of the California Academy of Sciences Academy
- Member of the International Plant Taxonomy Association
- Since 1994, member of the Project Species Plantarum

=== Plants named in his honor ===
- (Acanthaceae) Justicia danielii Durkee
