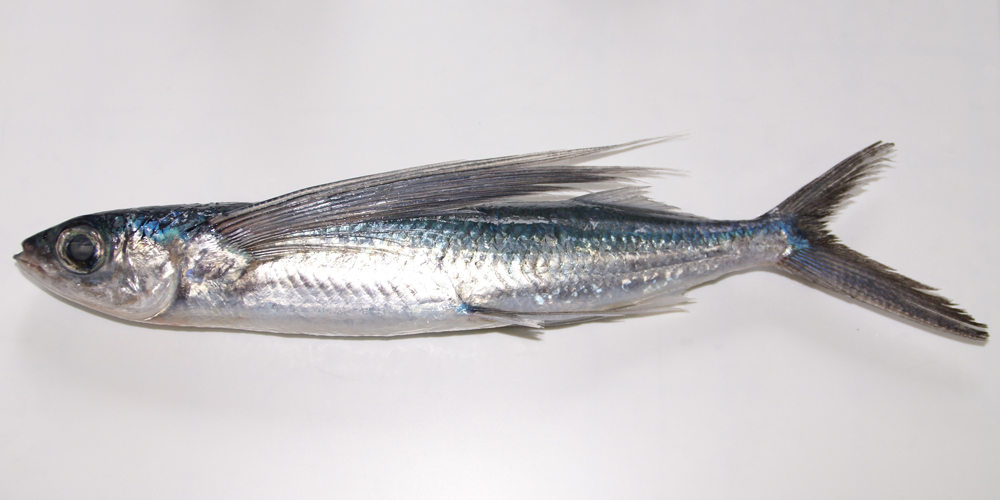
- C. p. japonicus
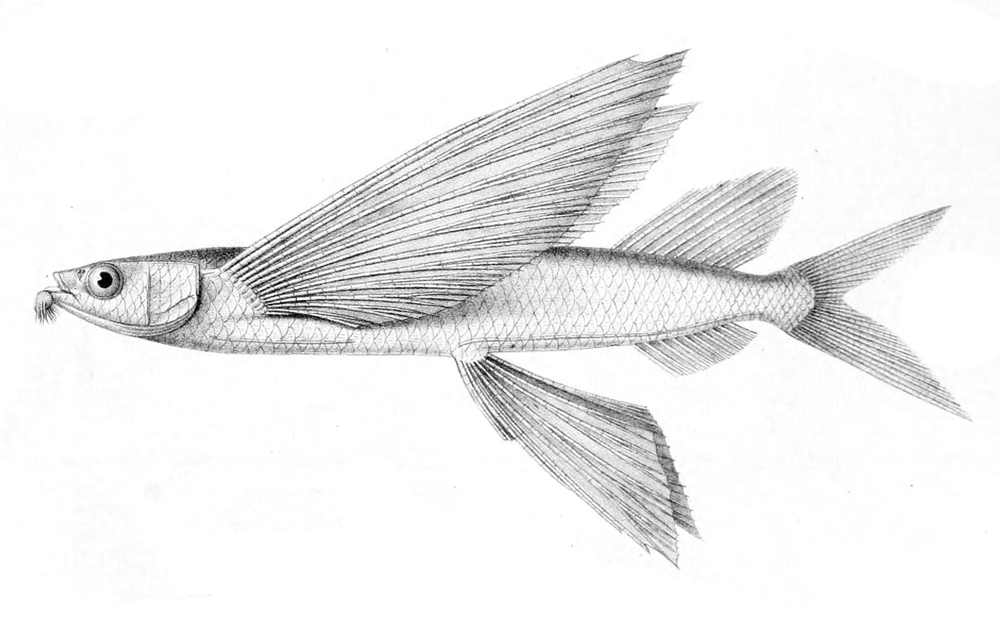
- 1885 illustration

Conservation status
- Least Concern (IUCN 3.1)

Scientific classification
- Kingdom: Animalia
- Phylum: Chordata
- Class: Actinopterygii
- Division: Teleostei
- Order: Beloniformes
- Family: Exocoetidae
- Genus: Cheilopogon
- Species: C. pinnatibarbatus

Binomial name
- Cheilopogon pinnatibarbatus (Bennett, 1831)

Synonyms
- Exocoetus pinnatibarbatus Bennett, 1831; Cypselurus pinnatibarbatus (Bennett, 1831); Cypselurus pulchellus Lowe, 1841; Exocoetus lineatus Valenciennes, 1847; Cypselurus lineatus (Valenciennes, 1847); Exocoetus orbignianus Valenciennes, 1847; Exocoetus robustus Günther, 1866; Exocoetus fernandezianus Philippi, 1895; Cypselurus minos Nichols & Breder, 1930

= Cheilopogon pinnatibarbatus =

Species of fish

Cheilopogon pinnatibarbatus, Bennett's flying fish, is a species of flying fish which has a circumglobal distribution in tropical and subtropical seas. It is an epiplegaic species which feeds on zooplankton and small fishes and is capable of leaping out of the water and gliding over the surface.

== Subspecies ==
There are four subspecies of this widely distributed flying fish:

- Cheilopogon pinnatibarbatus pinnatibarbatus (Bennett, 1831) (Bennett's flying fish) - Atlantic and western Indian Ocean
- Cheilopogon pinnatibarbatus californicus (J. G. Cooper, 1863) (California flying fish) - Eastern Pacific Ocean, from Oregon to Baja California
- Cheilopogon pinnatibarbatus japonicus (V. Franz, 1910) - north western Pacific Ocean, around Japan
- Cheilopogon pinnatibarbatus melanocercus (J. D. Ogilby, 1885) (Australasian flying fish) - southwestern Pacific, eastern Australia and New Zealand
