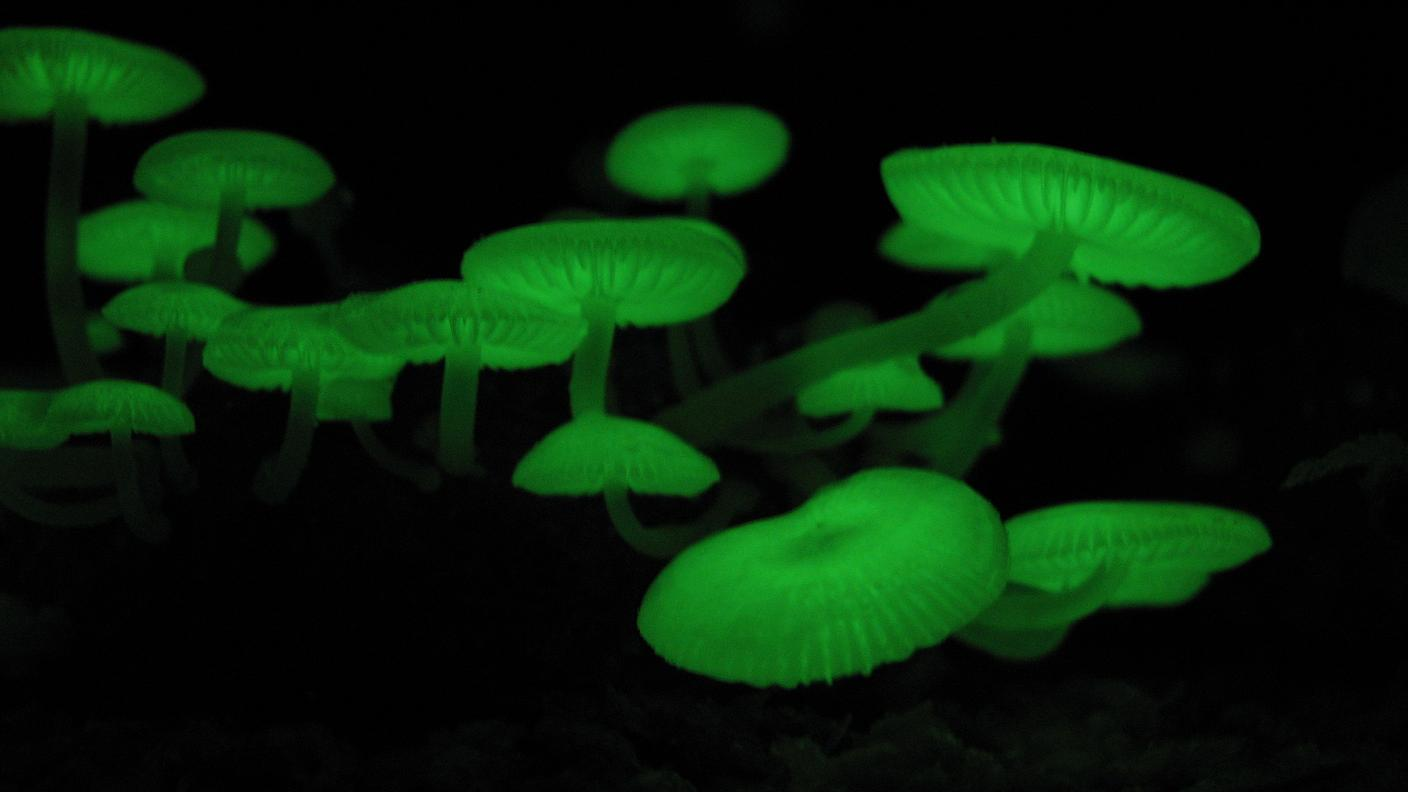
- In Hachijō-jima botanical park, Japan

Scientific classification
- Kingdom: Fungi
- Division: Basidiomycota
- Class: Agaricomycetes
- Order: Agaricales
- Family: Mycenaceae
- Genus: Mycena
- Species: M. chlorophos

Binomial name
- Mycena chlorophos (Berk. & M.A.Curtis) Sacc. (1887)

Synonyms
- Agaricus chlorophos Berk. & M.A.Curtis (1860); Agaricus cyanophos Berk. & M.A. Curtis (1860)

= Mycena chlorophos =

Species of agaric fungus

Mycena chlorophos is a species of agaric fungus in the family Mycenaceae. First described in 1860, the fungus is found in subtropical Asia, including India, Japan, Taiwan, Polynesia, Indonesia, and Sri Lanka, in Australia, and Brazil. Fruit bodies (mushrooms) have pale brownish-grey sticky caps up to 30 mm (1.2 in) in diameter atop stems 6–30 mm (0.2–1.2 in) long and up to a millimeter thick. The mushrooms are bioluminescent and emit a pale green light. Fruiting occurs in forests on fallen woody debris such as dead twigs, branches, and logs. The fungus can be made to grow and fruit in laboratory conditions, and the growth conditions affecting bioluminescence have been investigated.

== Taxonomy ==
The species was first described scientifically by Miles Berkeley and Moses Ashley Curtis in 1860 as Agaricus chlorophos. The original specimens were collected from the Bonin Islands by American botanist Charles Wright in October 1854 as part of the North Pacific Exploring and Surveying Expedition of 1853–56. Pier Andrea Saccardo transferred the species to the genus Mycena in an 1887 publication. Daniel Desjardin and colleagues redescribed the species and set a lectotype specimen in 2010.

In 1860, Berkeley and Curtis described the species Agaricus cyanophos from the material also collected from the Bonin Islands. This material was found near the location that the original specimens of M. chlorophos were found, but a couple of weeks later. Japanese mycologists Seiya Ito and Sanshi Imai studied these collections in the late 1930s, and concluded that Agaricus cyanophos was the same species as M. chlorophos, despite differences in cap shape, gill attachment, and the color of emitted light. Desjardin and colleagues agreed with this determination after examining the type material of both taxa. M. chlorophos is classified in the section Exornatae of the genus Mycena. Other luminescent species in this section are M. discobasis and M. marginata. Some authors have considered M. illuminans to be synonymous with M. chlorophos due to their morphological similarity, but molecular analysis has shown that they are distinct species.

In Japan, the mushroom is known as yakoh-take, or "night-light mushroom". In the Bonin Islands, it is called "Green Pepe".

== Description ==
Mycena chlorophos
- Mycological characteristics
- Gills on hymenium
- Cap is conical or flat
- Hymenium is free or adnexed
- Stipe is bare
- Spore print is white
- Ecology is saprotrophic
- Edibility is unknown

The cap is initially convex before flattening out (sometimes forming a central depression), and measures up to 30 mm (1.2 in) in diameter. The cap has radial grooves extending to nearly the center, and sometimes develops cracks in the margin, which has small rounded teeth. Its color is pale brownish gray that fades after expansion, and it is somewhat sticky. The white stem is 6–30 mm (0.24–1.18 in) long by 0.3–1 mm thick, hollow, and translucent. It has tiny hairs on the surface. The base of the stem is disc-shaped or somewhat bulbous, measuring 1–2.5 mm wide. The thin gills are free from attachment to the stem, or are adnexed (narrowly attached) to a slight collar encircling the stem. Initially white then grayish in color, they are somewhat crowded, with 17–32 full-length gills and 1 to 3 tiers of lamellulae (shorter gills that do not extend fully from the cap margin to the stem). The gills are 0.3–1 mm wide with micaceous edges. The flesh is very thin, and has a strong odor of ammonia. Both the caps and the gills are bioluminescent, while the mycelia and stems have little to no luminescence.

The spores are white, smooth, roughly elliptical, and have dimensions of 7–8.5 by 5–6 μm. The basidia (spore-bearing cells) are 17–23 by 7.5–10 μm, and four-spored with sterigmata around 3 μm long. The paraphyses are 5–8 μm wide, shorter than the basidia, more abundant and form a somewhat gelatinous layer. The cheilocystidia (cystidia on the cap edge) are 60 by 7–21 μm, hyaline, conical or ventricose (inflated). The tips of the cheilocystidia are drawn out to a point, or have a short appendage measuring 15 by 2–3 μm, which is sometimes branched, and is thin or slightly thick-walled. There are no cystidia on the gill face (pleurocystidia). Pileocystidia (cystidia on the surface of the cap) are club-shaped, measuring 25–60 by 13–25 μm. They are somewhat thick-walled, and spiny on the exposed surface with short simple outgrowths extending up to 3 μm long. The pileocystidia are joined together and form a continuous layer over the young cap, but break up as the cap expands. The caulocystidia (cystidia on the stem) are conical or lance-shaped, hyaline, and smooth, with walls that are thin or slightly thickened. They measure up to 300 by 10–25 μm, but are shorter in the upper regions of the stem. Clamp connections are present in the hyphae of all tissues.

== Similar species ==
The two other luminescent species of Mycena section Exornatae are similar in appearance to M. chlorophos. M. discobasis fruit bodies have paler caps; microscopically, they have larger spores measuring 9.9 by 6.7 μm, and lack the short apical appendage found on M. chlorophos cheilocystidia. M. margarita has smaller spores averaging 6.9 by 4.4 μm, smaller cheilocystidia, and loop-like clamp connections.

== Habitat and distribution ==
Fruit bodies of Mycena chlorophos are found in forests, where they grow in groups on woody debris such as fallen twigs, branches, and bark. In the Japanese Hachijo and Bonin Islands, mushrooms occur predominantly on decaying petioles of the palm Phoenix roebelenii. The fungus requires a proper range of humidity to form mushrooms; for example, on Hachijo Island, fruiting only occurs in the rainy seasons in June/July and September/October when the relative humidity is around 88%, usually the day after rain falls. Experimental studies have shown that mushroom primordia that are too wet become deformed, while conditions that are too dry cause the caps to warp and break because the delicate gelatinous membrane covering them is broken.

In Asia, the species has been found in Japan, Taiwan, Polynesia, Java, and Sri Lanka. In Japan, the fungus is becoming more scarce as its natural habits are decreasing. Several Australian field guides have reported the species from that country. The fungus has also been recorded several times from Brazil. Mycena chlorophos was one of several fungi featured in a set of postage stamps issued in Samoa in 1985.

== Bioluminescence studies ==
Since the mushroom is small, and fruits in only a limited season in a small area, researchers have investigated the conditions needed to artificially cultivate the species in laboratory conditions, in order to have more material to study the mechanism of bioluminescence, and to help preserve the species. The optimum temperature for the growth of mycelia is 27 °C (81 °F), while the optimum for the growth of primordia is 21 °C (70 °F). These temperatures are consistent with the subtropical climate in which the species is typically found. Maximum luminescence occurs at 27 °C, and about 25–39 hours after the primordia begin to form, when the cap has fully expanded. At 21 °C, luminescence persists for about 3 days, and becomes undetectable to the naked eyes about 72 hours after primordium initiation. Additional biochemical research has shown that trans-p-hydroxycinnamic acid, found in the cap (pileus) of *Mycena chlorophos*, acts as a key activator in its bioluminescent reaction.

== See also ==
- List of bioluminescent fungi
