= Mancoa =

Scientific classification
- Kingdom: Plantae
- Clade: Tracheophytes
- Clade: Angiosperms
- Clade: Eudicots
- Clade: Rosids
- Order: Brassicales
- Family: Brassicaceae
- Genus: Mancoa; Wedd.

Genus of plants

Mancoa is a genus of flowering plants belonging to the family Brassicaceae.

Its native range is Mexico to Peru, and to Northwestern Argentina.

== Species ==
Species:

- Mancoa bracteata (S.Watson) Rollins
- Mancoa foliosa (Wedd.) O.E.Schulz
- Mancoa hispida Wedd.
- Mancoa laevis Wedd.
- Mancoa laxa Rollins
- Mancoa mexicana Gilg & Muschl.
- Mancoa perennis L.Hern. & M.Martínez
- Mancoa rollinsiana Calderón
- Mancoa venturii Al-Shehbaz
