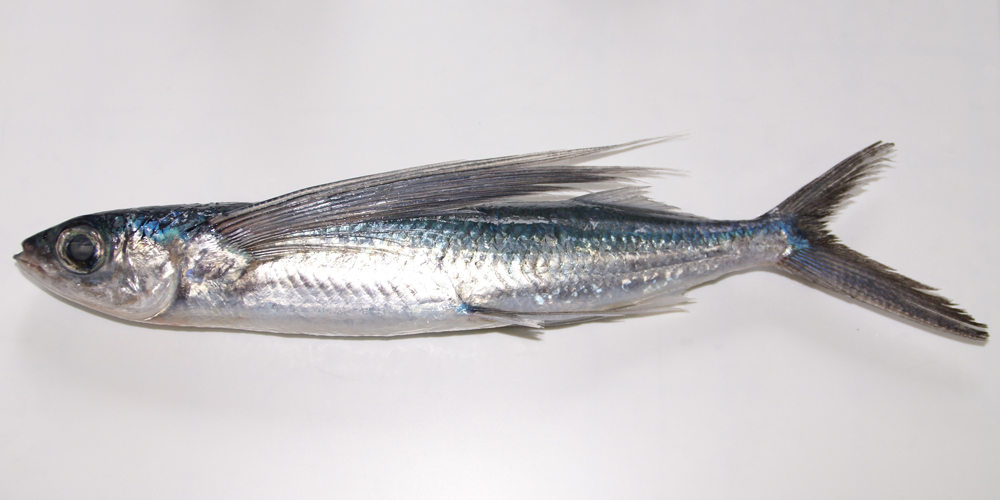

Scientific classification
- Kingdom: Animalia
- Phylum: Chordata
- Class: Actinopterygii
- Division: Teleostei
- Order: Beloniformes
- Family: Exocoetidae
- Genus: Cheilopogon
- Species: C. pinnatibarbatus
- Subspecies: C. p. japonicus

Trinomial name
- Cheilopogon pinnatibarbatus japonicus (V. Franz, 1910)

= Cheilopogon pinnatibarbatus japonicus =

Subspecies of fish

Cheilopogon pinnatibarbatus japonicus is a subspecies of flying fish of the family Exocoetidae, found in the seas around Japan. Its length is up to 50 cm.
