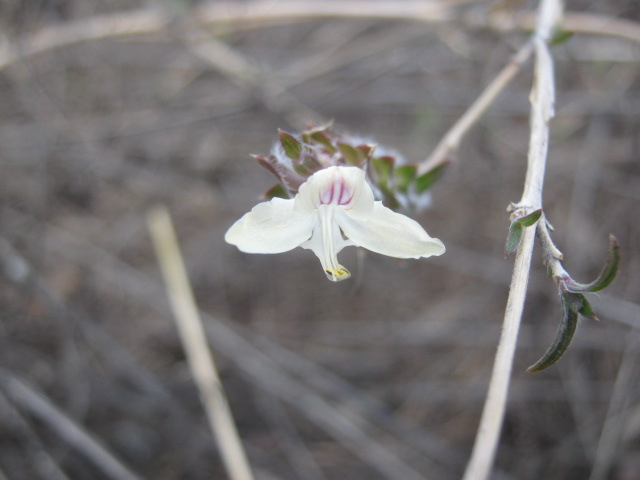
- Tetramerium nervosum

Scientific classification
- Kingdom: Plantae
- Clade: Tracheophytes
- Clade: Angiosperms
- Clade: Eudicots
- Clade: Asterids
- Order: Lamiales
- Family: Acanthaceae
- Subfamily: Acanthoideae
- Tribe: Justicieae
- Genus: Tetramerium; Nees (1846)

Species
- 30; see text

Synonyms
- Averia Leonard (1940)

= Tetramerium =

Genus of flowering plants

Tetramerium is a genus of plants belonging to the family Acanthaceae. It is found in the Americas, ranging from the southwestern United States to Bolivia, especially in tropical dry forests. Christian Gottfried Daniel Nees von Esenbeck first described the genus in 1846 after collecting two species (T. polystachyum and T. nervosum) on the journey of HMS Sulphur.

== Species ==
30 species are accepted.

- Tetramerium abditum (Brandegee) T.F.Daniel
- Tetramerium aureum Rose
- Tetramerium butterwickianum T.F.Daniel
- Tetramerium carranzae T.F.Daniel
- Tetramerium crenatum T.F.Daniel
- Tetramerium denudatum T.F.Daniel
- Tetramerium diffusum Rose
- Tetramerium emilyanum T.F.Daniel
- Tetramerium fruticosum Brandegee
- Tetramerium glandulosum Oerst.
- Tetramerium glutinosum Lindau ex Loes.
- Tetramerium guerrerense T.F.Daniel
- Tetramerium langlassei Hopp
- Tetramerium mcvaughii T.F.Daniel
- Tetramerium nemorum Brandegee
- Tetramerium nervosum Nees – hairy fornwort - cultivated for xeriscapes
- Tetramerium oaxacanum T.F.Daniel
- Tetramerium obovatum T.F.Daniel
- Tetramerium ochoterenae (Miranda) T.F.Daniel
- Tetramerium peruvianum (Lindau) T.F.Daniel
- Tetramerium rubrum Hopp
- Tetramerium rzedowskii T.F.Daniel
- Tetramerium sagasteguianum T.F.Daniel
- Tetramerium surcubambense T.F.Daniel
- Tetramerium tenuissimum Rose
- Tetramerium tetramerioides (Lindau) T.F.Daniel
- Tetramerium vargasiae T.F.Daniel & Cruz Durán
- Tetramerium wasshausenii T.F.Daniel
- Tetramerium yaquianum T.F.Daniel
- Tetramerium zeta T.F.Daniel
