= Uta Felgner =

German businesswoman (born 1951)

Uta Felgner (born 14 August 1951) is a German businesswoman. By the end of 2006, she was becoming known as the most high-profile hotel manager in the country. She was the manager of Berlin's luxurious Castle Hotel ("Schlosshotel") in Grunewald during June/July 2006 when all the hotel's 42 rooms and 12 suites were taken over to accommodate the Germany national team while it participated in the 2006 FIFA World Cup. Other well known guests of the hotel while she was its manager had by that time already included Woody Allen, Roman Polanski, Henry Kissinger Vitali Klitschko, Uwe Seeler, the King of Spain and the Sultan of Brunei.

She hit the headlines three years later in November 2009 after journalists working for the Berliner Morgenpost (newspaper) revealed that during the 1980s she had operated as an unusually active Informal collaborator in the German Democratic Republic (East Germany), working for the country's Ministry for State Security (Stasi / intelligence services). The starting point for the journalists' researches had been an originally secret file on Felgner held in preserved Stasi records, comprising approximately 3,000 pages.

== Life ==
=== Provenance and early years ===
Uta Felgner was born on 14 August 1951 in Weißenfels, a mid-sized manufacturing town a short distance upriver from Halle in what was then the southern part of the recently launched German Democratic Republic (East Germany). According to her own statements she was the only daughter of a holocaust survivor. Her father was a precision engineer and a man of exceptional fecundity. According to a 2005 newspaper report she had eleven half-siblings. Her mother worked as a nurse. She completed her schooling in East Berlin and then, unusually for an East German student at this time, spent a period in the west of the city, obtaining a business management degree at the Free University. In 2009 journalists attempting to corroborate Felgner's life story asked the Free University of Berlin for information on Felgner's university degree. However, the university found no reference to Felgner's degree in the archives.

=== Günther Asbeck ===
In 1973, after qualifying and working as a nurse, and having had a daughter, Felgner moved permanently to East Berlin where she undertook a range of jobs, including waitressing, selling, export administration, property management and as a beautician. In the mid-1970s, she met Günther Asbeck, a charismatic businessman. Asbeck was the General Director of ASIMEX (Asbeck Import Export), a company that specialised in importing luxury western goods for senior members of the country's ruling party living in the prestigious Waldsiedlung "secure housing zone", just outside Berlin. She got to know Asbeck better: he changed Felgner's life dramatically. Asbeck was a worldly man with a special proposal. "He needed a female partner to provide representation services and to entertain Asimex business associates and others to meals. She must always be available for him, whenever he needed her." Records indicate that Uta Felgner did not need to be asked twice: she became his mistress.

In 1981, Günther Asbeck turned up in the west. He provided the West German intelligence services with descriptions of around 100 top officials in East Germany's ruling Socialist Unity Party, its Ministry for State Security and its "front companies". His information included compromising details on these individuals which, he said, they had confided to his "business lady". Later, in a letter intercepted by the East German Ministry for State Security, it was found that Felgner herself had written that in the course of her work for Asbeck she had "gotten hold of [information on] the corruption of ministers, secretaries of state and senior officials".

Felgner knew her knowledge had a value. Months before her backer, Asbeck, fled to the west she had confided information to the Ministry for State Security "in the hope of obtaining material advantages", in the bureaucratic language of the Stasi record. Asbeck himself was surely unaware of her approach to the Stasi. In a country where the waiting list for citizens applying to purchase a Trabant was reckoned in years, he was providing Felgner with the use of a luxury car and other accoutrements of a western life-style to which few others, outside the political establishment, could aspire. As the senior Stasi officer handling Felgner's case noted, "she said Asbeck would have dropped her immediately if he had been informed of her co-operation with the Ministry for State Security". Nearly thirty years later the journalists investigating her past asked Felgner about all this, but she "no longer had a precise recollection of her activities back then" ("... an die Anfangszeit ihrer Tätigkeit keine genaue Erinnerung mehr").

=== Stasi ===
The files confirm that on 1 August 1980 Uta Felgner, apparently without any invitation or pressure to do so, volunteered to provide information to the Ministry for State Security. She offered information about western businessmen. The files show that the Stasi waited a couple of months, but in October the first contact meeting took place, and in April 1981 arrangements were concluded. This version of events was confirmed five years later when Felgner found herself arrested and protested, "After all, I offered my services to the Stasi on my own initiative". Looking back many years later she was vague on most of the details, but she did remember "5593392", the telephone number she was to use to report information to her Stasi handlers. She remembered their names: Pohl and Bethke. And she remembered her own IM cover name: "Schmidt".

The files are more forthcoming. She established contact with influential men using what the Stasi jargon described as "specifically womanly methods" (mit "frauenspezifischen Methoden"). A co-worker from those times later recalled: "In the international hotels like the "Metropol" and the "Palace" in Berlin, or during the Leipzig Trade Fair, we picked out men from the west and went to bed with them. And it sometimes got pretty wild at Uta's house in Berlin-Kaulsdorf. That way we got to lead interesting lives and were able to escape the every day".

In October 1981, Uta Felgner married for the fourth time. The files record that she was outraged when she discovered that her new husband was also on the Stasi payroll. His role involved infiltrating smuggling operations under a false identity. After she was arrested in 1986 she complained that her husband had "used her to make contacts during so-called holiday trips". Quizzed on this statement decades later she explained that after she was arrested she had been placed under such pressure - even being placed in a cell with two child murderers - that she had signed whatever statements had been presented to her in the Stasi jail.

=== Escape attempt and aftermath ===
Life again changed abruptly in 1986, shortly after her 35th birthday. Recently divorced for the fourth time, Felgner was introduced to the inside of a Stasi jail as an inmate of the Hohenschönhausen detention and interrogation centre. She had disappointed and let down her Stasi backers after developing a powerful urge to move across to West Germany. The files disclose that she applied to transfer and work as a "double agent". The Stasi reply was a categorical "no". Aside from any other considerations, it is reasonable to suppose that the Stasi, aware of Günther Asbeck's defection to the west, would have assumed - and probably known - that he had briefed West German intelligence about her. Uta Felgner's chances of operating in West Germany unbeknown to the security services there would have been zero. None of this diminished her resolve to move to the west. During the late 1940s and early 1950s millions had already done this, compounding the labour shortage created by the slaughter of war and causing the government to impose increasingly effective measures to stem the flow. Since 1979 (or earlier) escape from East Germany to West Germany (without official permission) had been illegal, difficult and dangerous. Nevertheless, Felgner planned to escape. The plan unravelled when Hans Schulze, the West German businessman who was, at this time, her lover, had his car searched by frontier officers when he was on his way home from the Leipzig Trade Fair. His BMW cabriolet was found to contain a large quantity of valuables and a large amount of money. There was also a letter, written by Felgner, setting out various explosive pieces of information about members of the East German political establishment. The letter was evidently intended to serve as "insurance" in the event of "problems" with the East German authorities.

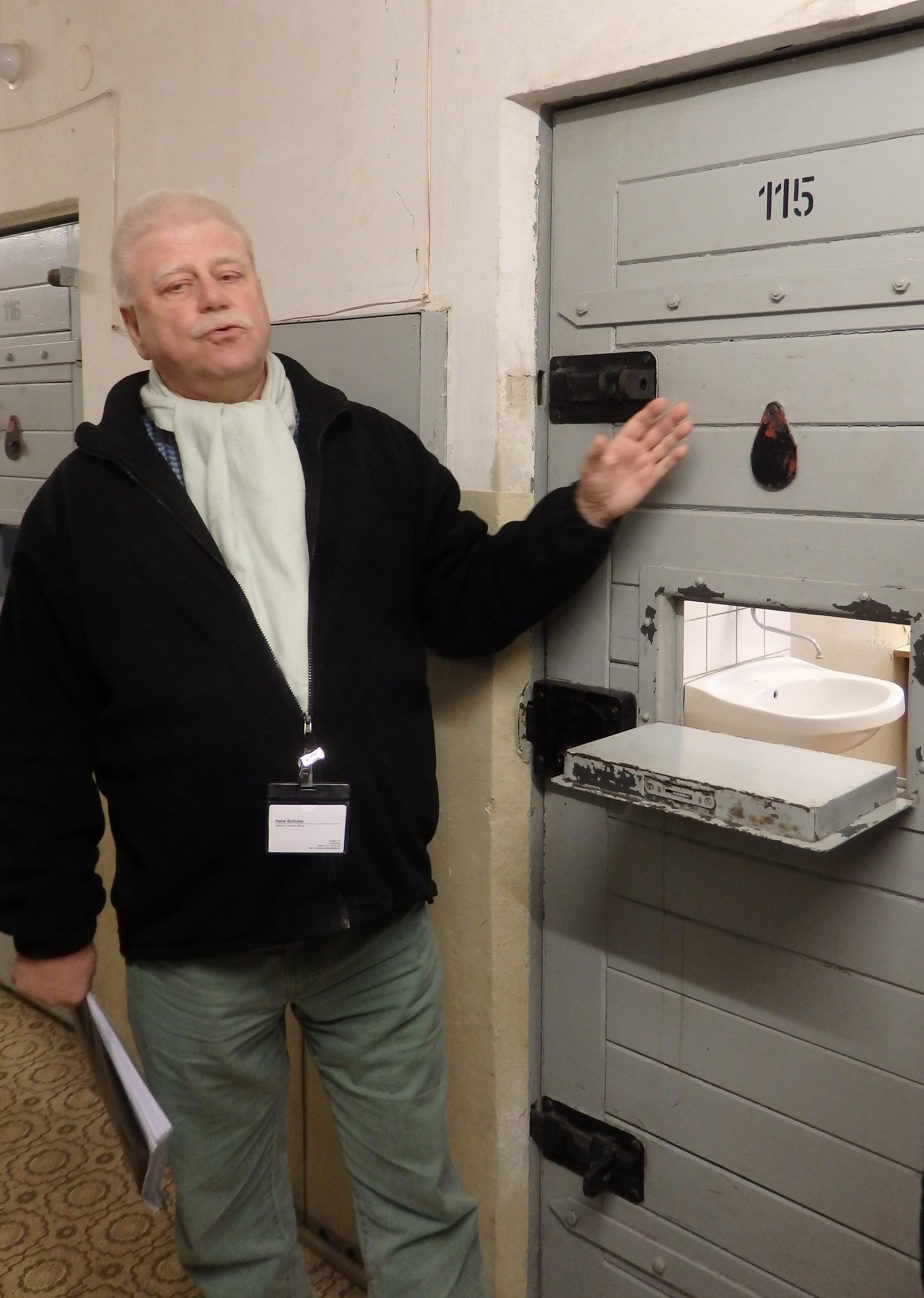
Hans Schulze points out his cell at the Stasi Hohenschönhausen interrogation center, not quite thirty years after his release Hermann Junghans, February 2017 (with the consent of Hans Schulze)

Uta Felgner was condemned to spend three and a half years in jail. Hans Schulze faced the same East Berlin military court as Felgner and like her received a substantial jail term. In the event, by the end of 1987 both lovers had been released after only fifteen months. By the standards of the time and place, and in the context of the offence for which they had been locked up, they had been leniently treated. This gave rise to press speculation that Uta Felgner's "explosive information" on senior establishment figures might have played a part in securing their early releases. Speculation focused on the senior judge Hilde Benjamin, controversial because of the number of people she had sent to the guillotine at a series of show trials in the early 1950s. There are suggestions that Felgner, by using her "specifically womanly methods" of obtaining information from men, had acquired information on Hilde Benjamin's personal life of a potentially explosive nature. It should not be expected that the nature of Felgner's "explosive information" would be spelled out in Stasi records. It is nevertheless interesting that shortly before her release Felgner signed a written undertaking that following her release from prison she would "maintain the strictest silence [about] her collaboration with the Ministry for State Security". Also unexpected for someone who had been convicted and imprisoned for trying to flee the country, is a card index entry in the Stasi records indicating that with effect from May 1988 Uta Felgner's status as an active Stasi collaborator had been reinstated.

=== More surprises for Hans Schulze ===
Whatever he may have learned during his time as a prisoner in East Germany, Hans Schulze, the West German lover implicated in Felgner's failed attempt to flee the country, had more surprises in store after he was made aware of the press revelations from the Stasi records. It was only then that he discovered that the woman he had known had been an Informal collaborator working for the Stasi.

That was not all. Visiting the Stasi Records Agency he came across and watched an old Stasi training film entitled "Wer ist wer?" ("Who's who?"). He himself appeared several times in the film, which featured the career progression of a female Stasi "decoy" identified in the film as IM Eva. Eva's biographical base data bore an uncanny resemblance to that of Uta Felgner. Schulze stated: "The woman dealt with at several points in the film is the woman I knew, Uta". The film depicted the agent as "exceptionally tactile and self assured" ("äußerst kontaktfreudig und selbstsicher auftretend"), which made it easy for her to establish "contact and intimacy ... with well positioned men", especially from the west. Other details which Schulze recognised as references to the woman he had known included the description of her as "always well turned out and dressed in the latest style, giving an attractive appearance which hit the mark" ("Stets gepflegt und sehr modern gekleidet, verfehlte ihr attraktives Äußeres dabei seine Wirkung nicht.").

=== After the wall came down ===
When the Berlin Wall was breached by protestors in November 1989 it quickly became apparent that the fraternal Soviet troops hosted by East Germany had not received instructions from Moscow to engage in violent suppression of any uprising, as they had done back in 1953. That opened the way for a series of changes which led to an end for one-party dictatorship and then, formally in October 1990, German reunification. The state for which Felgner and her Stasi handlers had worked no longer existed. Armed with an (apparently embellished) background as a qualified nurse with a school graduation certificate and some kind of degree in business administration from the Free University of Berlin, Felgner launched herself in the new Germany as a business woman. In 1993 she became the chief executive, and subsequently the proprietress, of Schneider Automobile GmbH, an automobile dealership in Berlin for which, according to chamber of commerce records, she paid 250,000 Marks. As in her former life, she used her networking skills to build up high society contacts, playing golf and tennis, also attending rotary club events and upmarket receptions. Felgner even became a member of the advisory council of the newly created Berlin Investment Bank. That put her in direct touch with three economically and politically influential Berlin senators: Wolfgang Branoner, Gregor Gysi and Harald Wolf.

After the bankruptcy of her automobile dealership she unexpectedly turned up in November 2003 as the manager of the Castle Hotel ("Schlosshotel"), a luxury hotel in Berlin's Grunewald quarter. This would give her the opportunity to apply her talents and charms not merely to the hotel guests, but also to journalists. During summer 2006, the hotel's 42 rooms and 12 suites were taken over to accommodate the Germany national team for the duration of the 2006 FIFA World Cup. As the public face of the hotel, Klinsmann's châtelaine ("Klinsis Schlossherrin") found herself called upon to give a never ending series of press interviews. There would be rules: all of the hotel's 81 staff would be required to wear black trousers or skirts and white T-shirts, echoing the footballers' own outfits. Staff would not be permitted to ask for autographs. But they had already welcomed the King of Spain and the Sultan of Brunei as guests: Schlosshotel staff would not be fazed by important guests. Maybe the famous players would have the chance to tell of their exploits to her four boys who sometimes played in the hotel gardens. Strangers would be kept away from the footballers and the view from neighbouring houses where rooms had been rented out to paparazzi photographers would be screened off for June. She was in her element. Six months after it was all over she confided her feelings in a newspaper contribution: "Nothing compares with this summer". She had taken the footballers to her heart, placing a letter on their beds each night "and a little surprise". Thanks to all those press interviews, by the end of 2006 Uta Felgner had become something of a media personality in her own right. In 2008 she appeared as the eponymous protagonist in a three part television series entitled "Retten Sie unser Hotel! – Ein Fall für Hotel-Expertin Uta Felgner" ("Save our hotel! - A case for Hotel Expert Uta Felgner").

In 2007, Felgner moved on, appointed by the entrepreneur Eugen Block to manage the five star 511 room "Grand Elysée Hotel" in Hamburg-Rotherbaum. In Hamburg she endeared herself to many in the city's moderate political mainstream by making public her reaction when the right wing German People's Union ("Deutsche Volksunion" / DVU) tried to book a conference. She wrote: "We should point out that if our hotel finds itself forced to hold this event, we will pass on all receipts from the function, which we have rejected, to the Hamburg Institute for Jewish Life. At least in this way we can back our political convictions, rejecting any right-wing extremism, and fulfill our moral obligations towards our Jewish fellow citizens".

After Felgner's links with the Stasi became into the public knowledge in November 2009, questions inevitably arose over the checks made by the Berlin Castle Hotel ("Schlosshotel") back in 2003 before they had employed her to manage the hotel. However, Michael Theim, former Dorint chairman, and speaking on behalf of the consortium that had owned the hotel at the time, simply invited his interlocutor to understand that he did not wish to discuss the matter. Eugen Block, who had recruited her to manage the Grand Elysée Hotel in Hamburg, was less reticent, accepting that he had made a mistake. He had been too willing to take Felgner at her word at the time when they had agreed her contract. As an example, she had concealed her five divorces from him.

By the end of November 2009, Uta Felgner was being described as the former boss at the Grand Elysée hotel. She was subsequently reported to be living in Switzerland with an entrepreneur.
