= Charles Wright (botanist) =

American botanist

- Born: 29 October 1811; Wethersfield, Connecticut
- Died: 11 August 1885 (although one reference says 1886); Wethersfield
- Known for: Taxonomy; Botany
- Scientific career
- Fields: Botany

Charles Wright (October 29, 1811 – August 11, 1885) was an American botanist.

== History ==
Wright was born in Wethersfield, Connecticut, the son of James Wright and Mary née Goodrich. He studied classics and mathematics at Yale, and in October 1835 moved to Natchez, Mississippi to tutor a plantation owner's family. His employer's business failed two years later, and he moved to Texas, working as a land surveyor and teacher. He surveyed ground for the Pacific Railroad Company. During this time, he also collected plants for Asa Gray. Gray thought of Wright as one of his most trusted collectors.

In 1849, he joined an army expedition (with Gray's help) through Texas, botanising from Galveston to San Antonio and then on to El Paso. But he had to walk most of the 673 miles, (which took over 104 days effort). He collected seeds of Penstemon baccharifolius (Hook), between Texas and El Paso, which were later given to William Hooker. Also, Castilleja lanata (found near the Rio Grande) and Castilleja integra (found in the Organ Mountains, near El Paso). In the spring of 1851, he joined the United States and Mexican Boundary Survey (also with Gray's help).

His collections from these two trips, formed the basis of Gray's Plantae Wrightianae (1852–53). He found around 50 new plants in the area.

Between 1853 and 1856, he took part in the Rodgers-Ringgold North Pacific Exploring and Surveying Expedition, collecting plants in Madeira, Cape Verde, Cape Town, Sydney, Hong Kong, the Bonin Islands, Japan (at Hakodate, Tanegashima, the Bonin Islands and the Ryukyu Islands including Okinawa) and the western side of the Bering Strait. He collected over 500 specimens while the ships were delayed at Simon's Bay, near Cape Town.

Wright left the expedition at San Francisco in February 1856 and went south to Nicaragua. His collection of plants from Hong Kong was used by George Bentham for his Flora Hongkongensis (1861).

Between 1856 and 1867, he led a scientific expedition to Cuba. He collected plants, bryophytes, fungi and lichens which were distributed by other botanists in exsiccata-like specimen series among others Plantae Cubenses Wrightianae, Musci Cubenses Charles Wright (edited by William Starling Sullivant) and Fungi Cubenses Wrightiani. In 1859 he joined Juan Gundlach in the area around Monteverde, and in the winter of 1861-62 they explored together around Cárdenas. He was also still in communication with Asa Gray and via him, Charles Darwin, discussing orchids. This was possible because at the start of the American Civil War, he was in Cuba and Gray kept him there until 1864 to keep Wright safe and his ongoing botanical work intact. In 1871, he went with the US Commission to Santo Domingo.

From 1875 to 1876, he was the librarian of the Bussey Institution at Harvard University.

Most of his lichen specimens were given to Edward Tuckerman. He distributed the specimens from Cuba in an exsiccata-like series with the title Caroli Wright lichenes insulae Cubae, curante E. Tuckerman. Other specimens were distributed by Johannes Müller Argoviensis.

== Legacy ==
Charles Wright is commemorated in the names of a number of plants, including Datura wrightii, the genus Carlowrightia (wrightworts) and Geissorhiza wrightii (Baker). George Engelmann named a small cactus after him, Wright's fishhook (Sclerocactus uncinatus var. wrightii). He is also commemorated in the name of the American grey flycatcher (Empidonax wrightii ) found near El Paso. Tropidophis wrighti (Wright's dwarf boa) was also named after him.

Charles Wright Elementary School in Wethersfield, Connecticut is named after him.

== See also ==
- European and American voyages of scientific exploration
