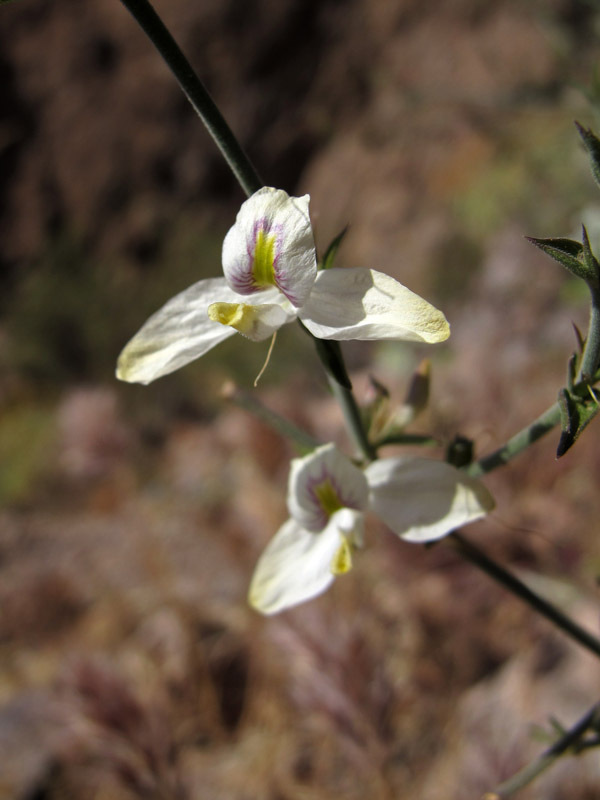
- Carlowrightia arizonica

Scientific classification
- Kingdom: Plantae
- Clade: Tracheophytes
- Clade: Angiosperms
- Clade: Eudicots
- Clade: Asterids
- Order: Lamiales
- Family: Acanthaceae
- Subfamily: Acanthoideae
- Tribe: Justicieae
- Genus: Carlowrightia; A.Gray (1878)

Synonyms
- Cardiacanthus Nees & S.Schauer (1847), nom. rej.; Croftia Small (1903), illegitimate homonym, not King & Prain 1896

= Carlowrightia =

Genus of flowering plants

Carlowrightia is a genus of flowering plants in the bear's breeches family, Acanthaceae. Members of the genus, commonly known as wrightworts, are mainly small shrubs bearing inflorescences of lily-like flowers. They are native to the Americas, ranging from the southwestern United States through Mexico and Central America, and in Ecuador. Many species are native to western North America. The genus was named for the American botanist Charles Wright.

== Species ==
27 species are accepted.

- Carlowrightia albiflora T.F.Daniel
- Carlowrightia arizonica A.Gray – Arizona wrightwort
- Carlowrightia ecuadoriana T.F.Daniel & Wassh.
- Carlowrightia fuertensis T.F.Daniel
- Carlowrightia hapalocarpa B.L.Rob. & Greenm.
- Carlowrightia henricksonii T.F.Daniel
- Carlowrightia hintonii T.F.Daniel
- Carlowrightia huicholiana T.F.Daniel
- Carlowrightia lesueurii Henrard & T.F.Daniel
- Carlowrightia lindauiana Standl.
- Carlowrightia linearifolia (Torr.) A.Gray – Heath wrightwort
- Carlowrightia mcvaughii T.F.Daniel
- Carlowrightia mexicana Henrickson & Daniel – Mexican wrightwort
- Carlowrightia myriantha (Standl.) Standl.
- Carlowrightia neesiana (Schauer) T.F.Daniel
- Carlowrightia ovata A.Gray
- Carlowrightia parviflora (Buckl.) Wassh. – Smallflower wrightwort
- Carlowrightia parvifolia Brandeg. – Littleleaf wrightwort
- Carlowrightia pectinata Brandegee
- Carlowrightia pringlei B.L.Rob. & Greenm.
- Carlowrightia purpurea T.F.Daniel
- Carlowrightia serpyllifolia A.Gray – Trans Pecos wrightwort
- Carlowrightia texana Henrickson & Daniel – Texas wrightwort
- Carlowrightia torreyana Wassh. – Torrey's wrightwort
- Carlowrightia trichocarpa T.F.Daniel
- Carlowrightia venturae T.F.Daniel
- Carlowrightia yucatanensis T.F.Daniel
