= Felger =

Felger is a surname. Notable people with the surname include:

- Jay Felger, recurring Earth character in Stargate SG-1
- Michael Felger (born 1969), American sports reporter and host
- Richard Stephen Felger (born 1934) (Felger), botanist

== See also ==
- Folger
