= Brood reduction =

Reduction of nestlings in a bird brood

Brood reduction occurs when the number of nestlings in a bird's brood is reduced, usually because there is a limited amount of resources available. It can occur directly via infanticide, or indirectly via competition over resources between siblings. Avian parents often produce more offspring than they can care for, resulting in the death of some of the nestlings. Brood reduction was originally described by David Lack in his brood-reduction hypothesis to explain the existence of hatching asynchrony in many bird species.

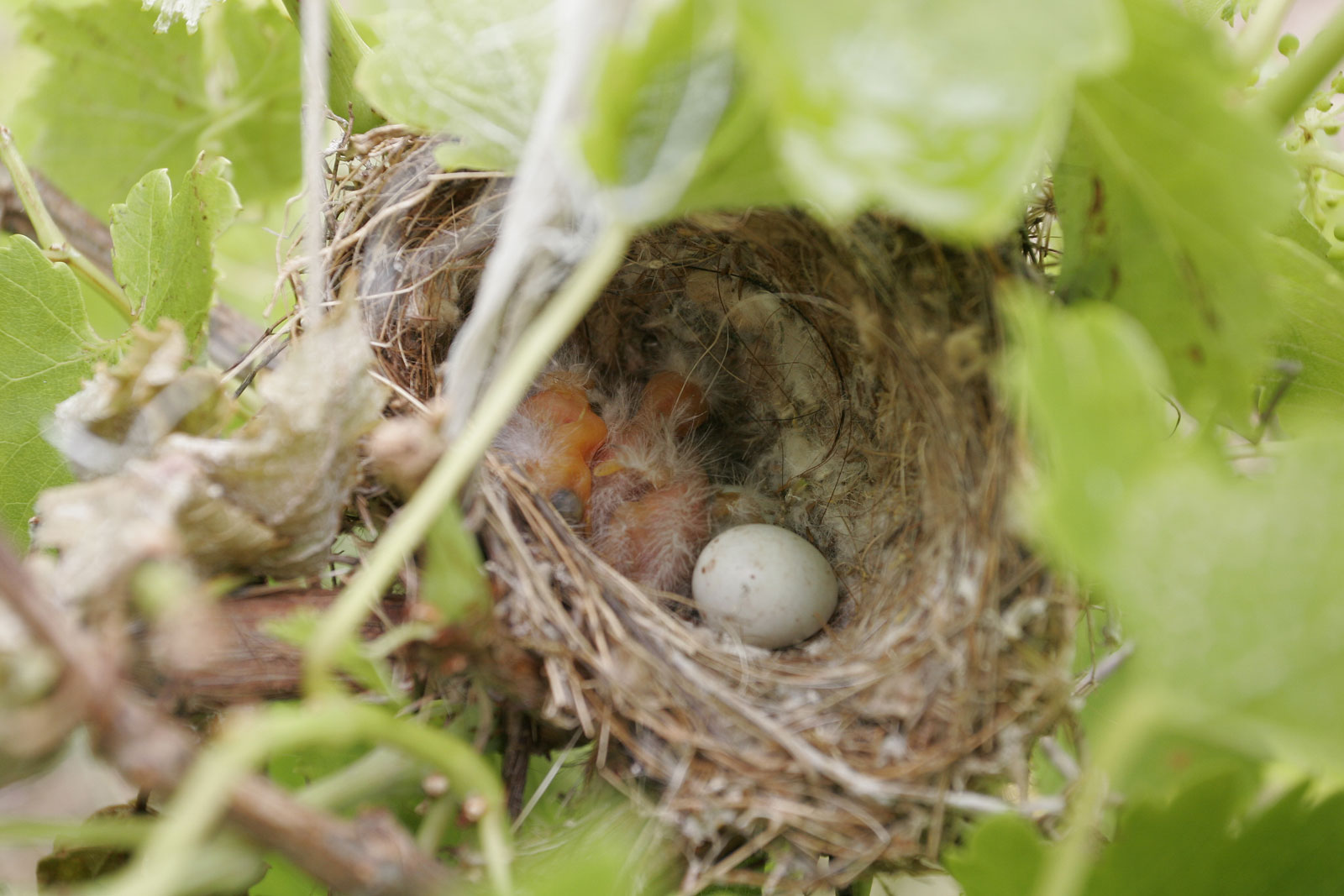
Bird nest in which hatching asynchrony is occurring.

Hatching asynchrony occurs when the parents start incubating their eggs before all of them have been laid. If resources are limited, it benefits the parents to allow brood reduction, because it reduces the amount of work they must do and increases their chances of surviving and reproducing again in future years.

Brood reduction has been observed in many avian species including seabirds such as black-legged kittiwakes, birds of prey such as Swainson's hawk and several eagle species, and songbirds including black-billed magpies and house wrens.

== Methods of brood reduction ==
=== Infanticide ===
Brood reduction often occurs as infanticide, the killing of nestlings by members of the same species. Infanticide can be done by siblings, which is referred to as siblicide, or by the parents, which is called filial infanticide. In virtually all species, brood reduction only occurs via siblicide, however in some species such as the white stork, filial infanticide has been observed. Siblicide often occurs via harassment and intimidation, preventing the smaller chicks from having enough food. However, fatal aggression between siblings is also common.

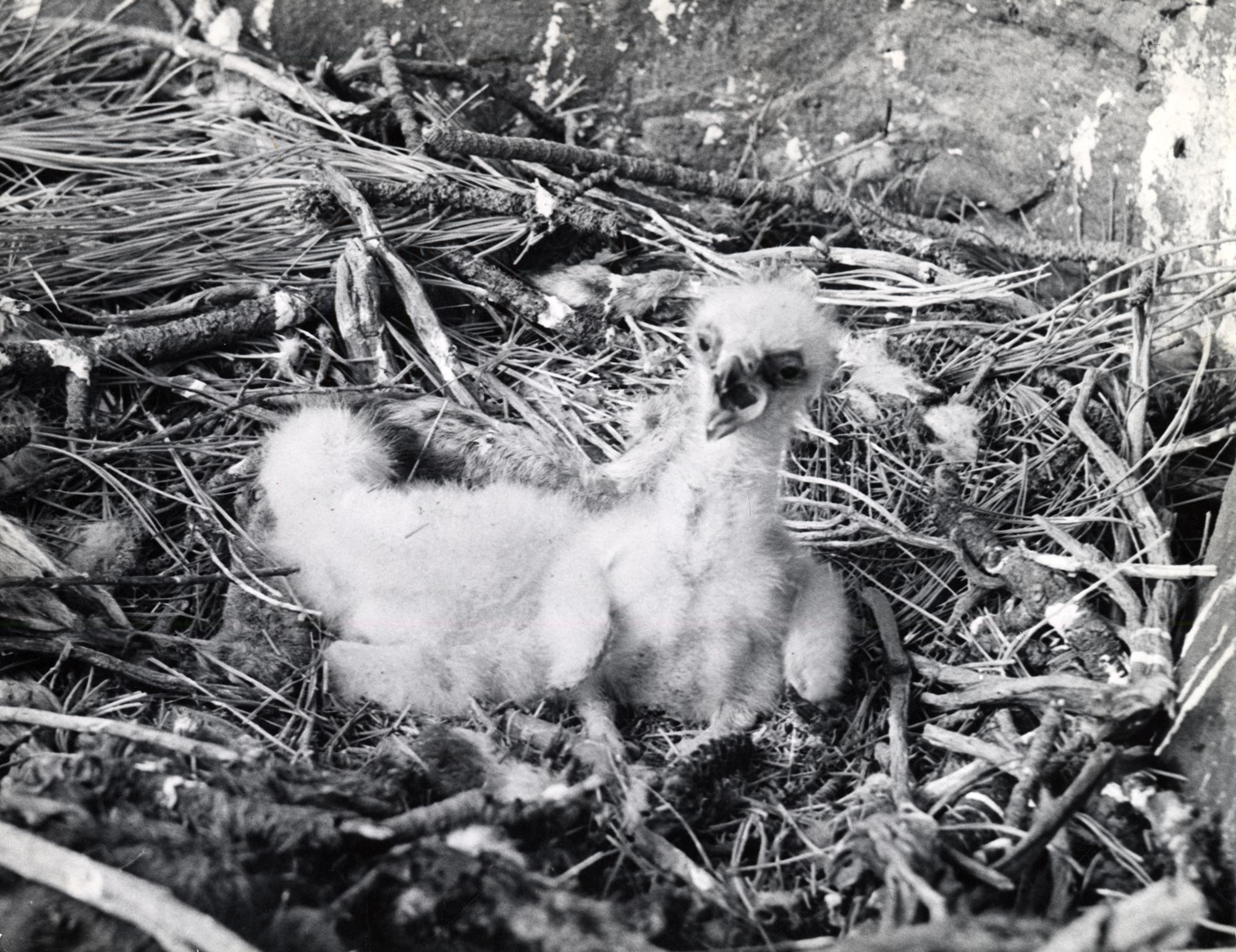
Golden eagle nestling.

Brood reduction by means of siblicide can be facultative or obligate. Facultative brood reduction depends on the conditions of that particular year, and only occurs when there is a limit to the resources available for the nestlings. Obligate brood reduction always occurs and does not depend on food availability.

Hatching asynchrony results in a dominance hierarchy between the nestlings, which often leads to the death of the youngest sibling. This can be seen in several species of birds of prey, such as eagles, and depends on the size difference between the siblings and therefore the amount of time that passes between each egg hatching. In the crowned eagle, the time interval between eggs hatching is 3 days, and in this species the brood reduction observed is obligate. In other eagle species, such as the greater spotted eagle and the imperial eagle, the hatching interval is only 2 days, and the type of brood reduction observed is facultative brood reduction.

=== Brood parasitism ===
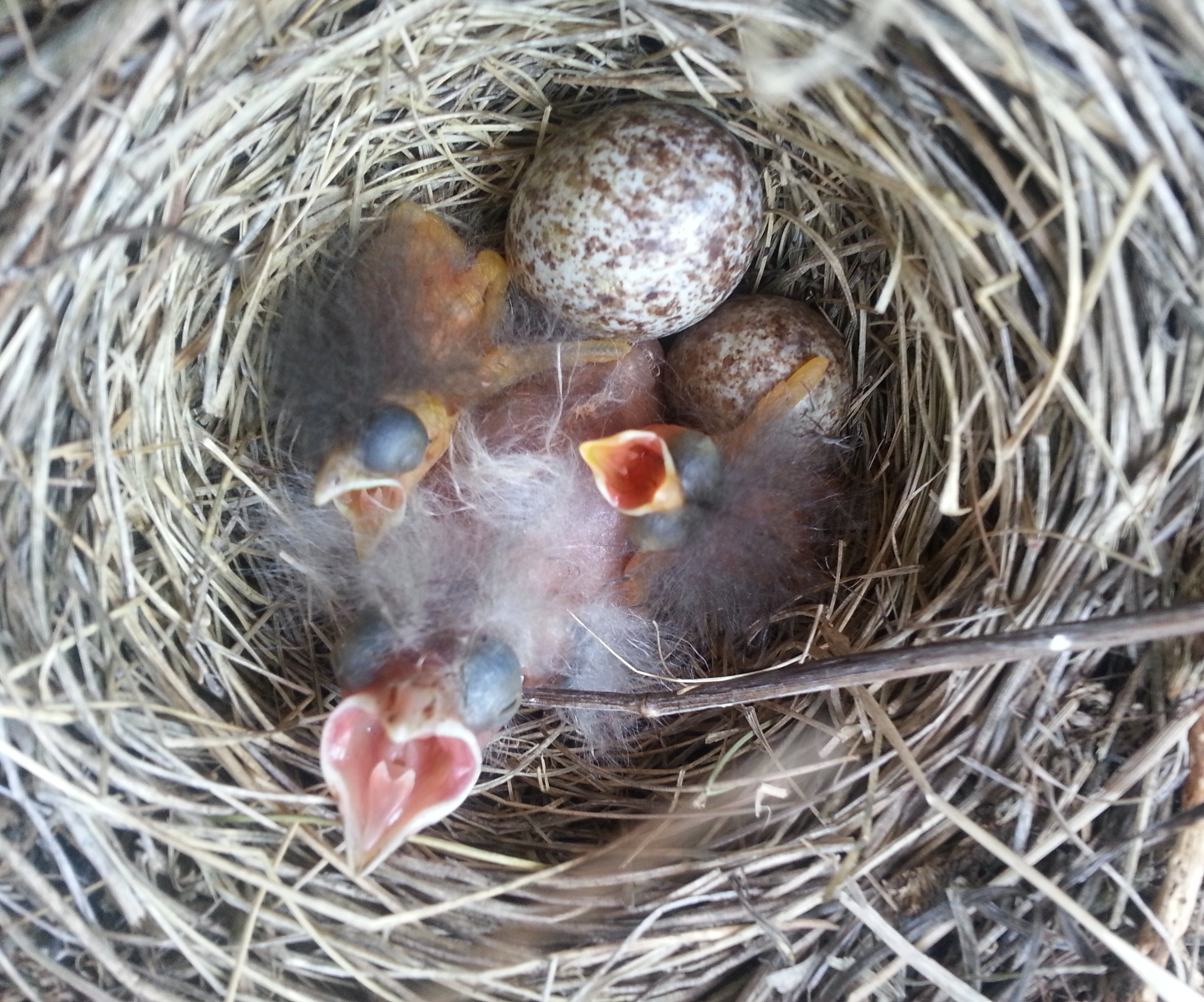
Brown-headed cowbird as a brood parasite.

Brood reduction can also be done by members of a different species. This can be seen in interspecific brood parasitism. Brood parasites lay their eggs in the nest of another bird species, relying on the host parents to raise their offspring. Brood parasitism can lead to brood reduction in different ways. Some brood parasites kill the eggs of the host species so that there is no competition for their own offspring. Parasitic nestlings can also cause brood reduction by out-competing the host species nestlings, or by simply killing them. Two species of cowbirds, the shiny cowbird, and the screaming cowbird, frequently parasitize the nests of the brown-and-yellow marshbird, resulting in an increased amount of brood reduction in this species.

== Lack's hypothesis ==
The brood-reduction hypothesis was first proposed by David Lack in 1947 to explain the evolution of hatching asynchrony and dominance hierarchy in the broods of some bird species. The hypothesis stated that hatching asynchrony exists to maximize the fitness of the nestlings in years where resources are low. During these years, the asynchronous pattern allows the brood size to be reduced to an amount that can be supported by the parents, by either directly killing the weakest nestlings or by siblings out-competing them. Hatching asynchrony would have no cost during years when resources are plentiful, and the whole brood would survive.

In a study on brood reduction in the common kestrel, it was shown that when brood reduction occurred in asynchronous nests, the cellular immunity of the nestlings improved compared to those in synchronous nests.

=== Criticisms of the hypothesis ===
Lack's assumption that there is no cost associated with hatching asynchrony during years where food is plentiful can not be proven. Studies show that competition remains a factor even when there are enough resources and that the last nestling to hatch is still at a disadvantage. In orders to test Lack's hypothesis, brood reduction must be adaptive, which can be determined by comparing the success of asynchronous broods and synchronous broods. Birds that have naturally synchronous broods must have higher nestling mortality when there are insufficient resources. It has been suggested that this can be tested using artificially synchronous broods, however, this artificial manipulation may have an effect on resource use. Also, in order to test this, the brood reduction threshold must be crossed. In other words, the conditions must be poor enough for brood reduction to occur. It is also possible that brood reduction could occur even when resources are plentiful, in this case being a maladaptive trait. Another criticism of the hypothesis is that there is no general threshold for brood reduction; conditions are not static and are not always the same for all individuals.

An alternate hypothesis that builds off of Lack's is the Offspring Quality Assurance Hypothesis. This hypothesis states that the benefit to hatching asynchrony is the hierarchy created from it. The hierarchy guarantees that at least some of the nestlings will survive, and whether or not some of the weaker nestlings die is irrelevant.
