= Siblicide =

Killing of an infant individual by its siblings

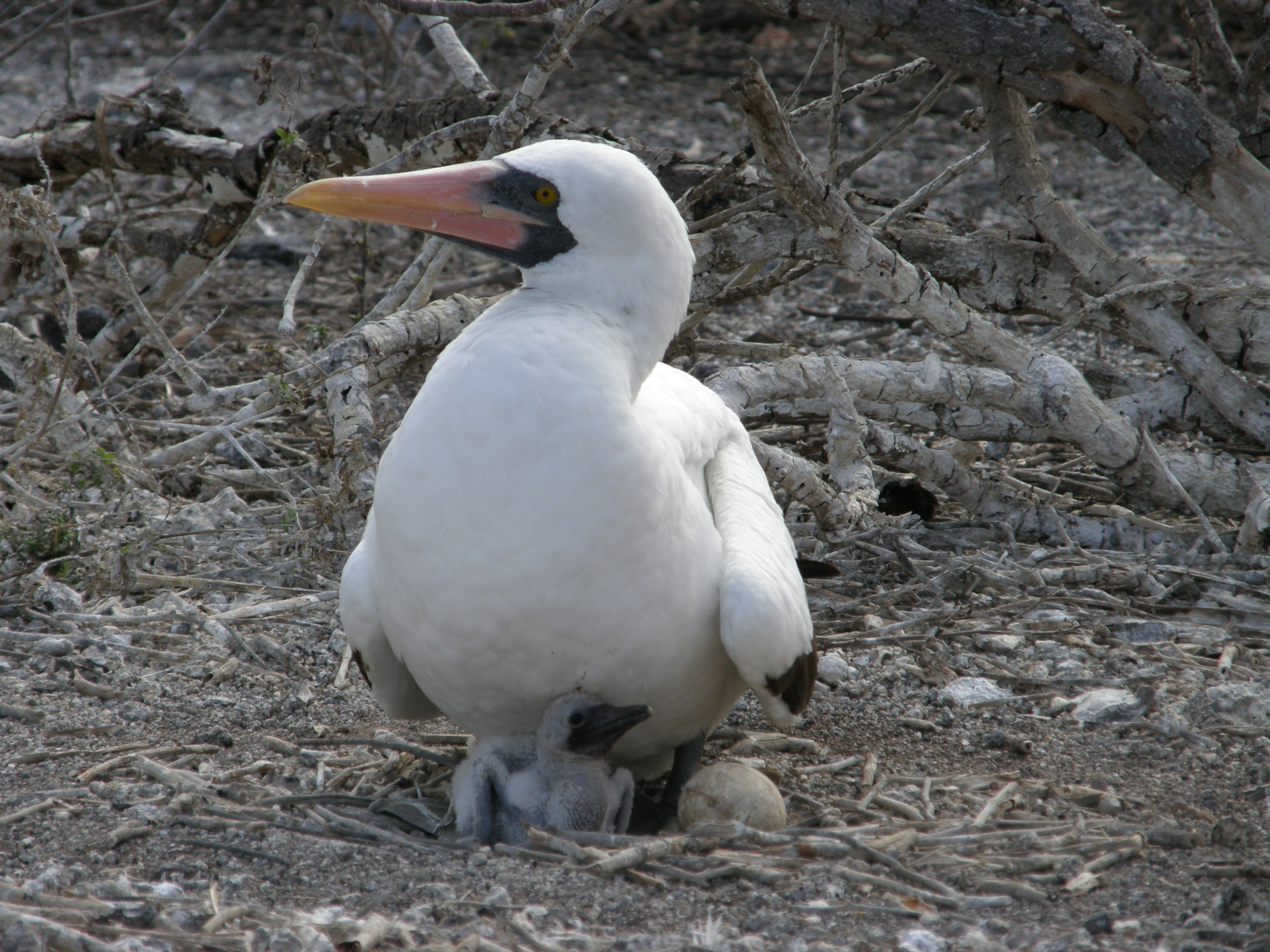
A Nazca booby (Sula granti) with a chick and egg. When the second egg hatches, any siblings present will almost certainly kill their younger brother or sister.

Siblicide, is the killing of an infant individual, especially a newly hatched bird, by its siblings. Siblicide has mainly, but not exclusively, been observed in birds. It may occur directly between full- or half-siblings or be mediated by the parents, and is driven by the direct evolutionary fitness benefits to the perpetrator and sometimes its parents.

Siblicidal behavior can be either obligate or facultative. In obligate siblicide, a sibling almost always ends up being killed. In facultative siblicide, a sibling may or may not be killed, based on environmental conditions. In birds, obligate siblicidal behavior results in the older chick killing the other chick(s). In facultative siblicidal animals, fighting is frequent, but does not always lead to death of a sibling; this type of behavior often exists in patterns for different species. For instance, in the blue-footed booby, a sibling may be hit by a nest mate only once a day for a couple of weeks and then attacked at random, leading to its death. More birds are facultatively siblicidal than obligatory siblicidal. This is perhaps because siblicide takes a great amount of energy and is not always advantageous.

Siblicide generally only occurs when resources, specifically food sources, are scarce. Siblicide is advantageous for the surviving offspring because they have now eliminated most or all of their competition. It is also somewhat advantageous for the parents because the surviving offspring most likely have the strongest genes, and therefore likely have the highest fitness.

Some parents encourage siblicide, while others prevent it. If resources are scarce, the parents may encourage siblicide because only some offspring will survive anyway, so they want the strongest offspring to survive. By letting the offspring kill each other, it saves the parents time and energy that would be wasted on feeding offspring that most likely would not survive anyway.

(The word siblicide is also used as a unifying term for fratricide and sororicide in the human species; unlike these more specific terms, siblicide leaves the sex of the victim unspecified.)

== Models ==
Originally proposed by Dorward (1962), the insurance egg hypothesis (IEH) has quickly become the most widely supported explanation for avian siblicide as well as the overproduction of eggs in siblicidal birds. The IEH states that the extra egg(s) produced by the parent serves as an "insurance policy" in the case of the failure of the first egg (either it did not hatch or the chick died soon after hatching). When both eggs hatch successfully, the second chick, or ‘B’ chick, is the so-called marginal offspring; it is marginal in the sense that it can add to or subtract from the evolutionary success of its family members. It can increase reproductive and evolutionary success in two primary ways. Firstly, it represents an extra unit of parental success if it survives along with its siblings.

In the context of Hamilton's inclusive fitness theory, the marginal chick increases the total number of offspring successfully produced by the parent and therefore adds to the gene pool that the parent bird passes to the next generation. Secondly, it can serve as a replacement for any of its siblings that do not hatch or die prematurely.

Inclusive fitness is defined as an animal's individual reproductive success, plus the positive and/or negative effects that animal has on its sibling's reproductive success, multiplied by the animal's degree of kinship. In instances of siblicide, the victim is usually the youngest sibling. This sibling's reproductive value can be measured by how much it enhances or detracts from the success of other siblings, therefore this individual is considered to be marginal. The marginal sibling can act as an additional element of parental success if it, as well as its siblings, survive. If an older sibling happens to die unexpectedly, the marginal sibling is there to take its place; this acts as insurance against the death of another sibling, which depends on the likelihood of the older sibling dying.

Parent–offspring conflict is a theory which states that offspring can take actions to advance their own fitness while decreasing the fitness of their parents and that parents can increase their own fitness while simultaneously decreasing the fitness of their offspring. This is one of the driving forces of siblicide because it increases the fitness of the offspring by decreasing the amount of competition they have. Parents may either discourage or accept siblicide, depending on whether it increases the probability of their offspring surviving to reproduce.

=== Mathematical representation ===
The cost and effect siblicide has on a brood's reproductive success can be broken down into an algebraic equation: $\ m\$ is some measure of the total parental care or parental investment (PI) in the entire brood, with an absolute maximum possible value $\ M_{\mathsf H}\$ (hence parental effort $\ m\$ constrained to $\ 0 \le m \le M_{\mathsf H}\$). Parents investing $\ m\$ units of care in the current batch of offspring can expect a future reproductive success $\ f(m)\ ,$ given by

for $\ m \le 0\$	$\quad\ f(m) = f_{\mathsf H}\ ;$
for $\ 0 < m < M_{\mathsf H}\$	$\quad\ f(m) = f_{\mathsf H} \times \left(\ 1 - \left( \frac{ m }{\ M_{\mathsf H}\ }\right)^\theta\ \right)\ ;$
for $\ M_\mathsf{H} \le m\$	$\quad\ f(m) = 0 ~.$

where $\ f_{\mathsf H}\$ is the parents' future reproductive success when it makes no reproductive attempt (reproduction postponed to next season). The constant $\ \theta\$ is a shape parameter that determines the relationship between parental investment and the cost of reproduction.

The equation models the risk / cost to the parent's own survival into the next breeding season, given the extra exertion to protect and provide food for their young; it indicates that as parental care $\ m\$ increases, the future reproductive success of the parent decreases. The parents' future reproductive success is modeled as an exhaustible asset, which drops to zero (no possibility of parents breeding again, later) if they provide self-sacrificial care ($\ m \ge M_{\mathsf H}\$), whereas the parents' own future prospects remain the same, or nearly the same, if they provide no care, or very little care ($\ 0 \lessapprox m\$).

The probability $\ P( m )\$ that the offspring thrive to join the breeding population after receiving $\ m\$ units of parental care is

for $\ m \le M_{\mathsf V}$	$\quad\ P( m ) = 0\$
for $\ m > M_{\mathsf V}\$	$\quad\ P( m ) = 1 - \frac{\; M_{\mathsf V}\ }{ m }\$

where $\ M_{\mathsf V}\$ is the minimum amount of parental care, $\ m\ ,$ required for the season's offspring to have any chance of growing to themselves become breeding adults.

The relation indicates that with inadequate care, or with merely adequate care, ($\ m \le M_{\mathsf V}\$) the whole brood will surely fail to survive to become reproducing adults, but that with more than adequate care ($\ m > M_{\mathsf V}\$) the probability of the offspring living and breeding in the next season rises (only becoming certain, $\ P = 1\ ,$ with a hypothetically "infinite" amount of parental care, $\ m\$).

$\ M_{\mathsf V}\$ is the minimum amount of effort required from the parents, $\ m\ ,$ to give their offspring any non-zero chance of their brood / litter maturing to themselves become breeding adults. If $\ M_{\mathsf V} \lessapprox M_{\mathsf H}\ ,$ then the parents just barely have a chance of producing any offspring, and have only one chance to breed in their lifetime, like many seasonal insects. If $\ M_{\mathsf V} \ll M_{\mathsf H}\ ,$ then the parents might raise several successful offspring, while still themselves having a fair chance of breeding again; in that case, $\ M_{\mathsf V} \lessapprox m\$ would represent a minimalist strategy, where the parents spend little effort, and the underfed offspring just barely have any chance of survival, but the parents conserve their own chance of breeding again later. At the other extreme, $\ m \lessapprox M_{\mathsf H}\$ would represent a parental "go for broke" strategy, where the parents will be unable to breed any more, but ensure maximal brood survival (e.g. salmon or octopuses laying myriad eggs, but the parents always dying soon after they breed). There is some kind of middle ground, $\ M_{\mathsf V} < m \approx M_\mathsf{opt} < M_{\mathsf H}\ ,$ where the parents raise as many offspring as possible, with some risk to their own future, but not so much that they completely squander their own chance of breeding again.

== Examples ==
=== In birds ===
Cattle egrets, Bubulcus ibis, exhibit asynchronous hatching and androgen loading in the first two eggs of their normal three-egg clutch. This results in older chicks being more aggressive and having a developmental head start. If food is scarce the third chick often dies or is killed by the larger siblings and so parental effort is distributed between the remaining chicks, which are hence more likely to survive to reproduce. The extra "excess" egg is possibly laid either due to exploit the possibility of elevated food abundance (as seen in the blue-footed booby, Sula nebouxii) or due to the chance of sterility in one egg. This is suggested by studies into the common grackle, Quiscalus quiscula and the masked booby, Sula dactylatra.

The theory of kin selection may be seen as a genetically mediated altruistic response within closely related individuals whereby the fitness conferred by the altruist to the recipient outweighs the cost to itself or the sibling/parent group. The fact that such a sacrifice occurs indicates an evolutionary tendency in some taxa toward improved vertical gene transmission in families or a higher percentage of the unit in reaching a reproductive age in a resource-limited environment.

The closely related masked and Nazca boobies are both obligately siblicidal species, while the blue-footed booby is a facultatively siblicidal species. In a facultatively siblicidal species, aggression occurs between siblings but is not always lethal, whereas in an obligately siblicidal species, aggression between siblings always leads to the death of one of the offspring. All three species have an average brood size of two eggs, which are laid within approximately four days of each other. In the few days before the second egg hatches, the first-born chick, known as the senior chick or A-chick, enjoys a period of growth and development during which it has full access to resources provided by the parent bird. Therefore, when the junior chick (B-chick) hatches, there is a significant disparity in size and strength between it and its older sibling.

In these three booby species, hatching order indicates chick hierarchy in the nest. The A-chick is dominant to the B-chick, which in turn is dominant to the C chick, etc. (when there are more than two chicks per brood). Masked booby and Nazca booby dominant A-chicks always begin pecking their younger sibling(s) as soon as they hatch; moreover, assuming it is healthy, the A-chick usually pecks its younger sibling to death or pushes it out of the nest scrape within the first two days that the junior chick is alive. Blue-footed booby A-chicks also express their dominance by pecking their younger sibling. However, unlike the obligately siblicidal masked and Nazca booby chicks, their behavior is not always lethal. A study by Lougheed and Anderson (1999) reveals that blue-footed booby senior chicks only kill their siblings in times of food shortage. Furthermore, even when junior chicks are killed, it does not happen immediately. According to Anderson, the average age of death of the junior chick in a masked booby brood is 1.8 days, while the average age of death of the junior chick in a blue-footed booby brood may be as high as 18 days. The difference in age of death in the junior chick in each booby species is indicative of the type of siblicide that the species practices. Facultatively siblicidal blue-footed booby A-chicks only kill their nest mate(s) when necessary. Obligately siblicidal masked and Nazca booby A-chicks kill their sibling no matter if resources are plentiful or not; in other words, siblicidal behavior occurs independently of environmental factors.

Blue-footed boobies are less likely to commit siblicide and if they do, they commit it later after hatching than masked boobies. In a study, the chicks of blue-footed and masked boobies were switched to see if the rates of siblicide would be affected by the foster parents. It turns out that the masked boobies that were placed under the care of blue-footed booby parents committed siblicide less often than they would normally. Similarly, the blue-footed booby chicks placed with the masked booby parents committed siblicide more often than they normally did, indicating that parental intervention also affects the offspring's behavior.

In another experiment which tested the effect of a synchronous brood on siblicide, three groups were created: one in which all the eggs were synchronous, one in which the eggs hatched asynchronously, and one in which asynchronous hatching was exaggerated. It was found that the synchronous brood fought more, was less likely to survive than the control group, and resulted in lower parental efficiency. The exaggerated asynchronous brood also had a lower survivorship rate than the control brood and forced parents to bring more food to the nest each day, even though not as many offspring survived.

=== In other animals ===
Siblicide (brood reduction) in spotted hyenas (Crocuta crocuta) resulted in the champions achieving a long-term growth rate similar to that of singletons and thus significantly increased their expected survival. The incidence of siblicide increased as the average cohort growth rate declined. When both cubs were alive, total maternal input in siblicidal litters was significantly lower than in non-siblicidal litters. Once siblicide has occurred, the growth rates of siblicide survivors substantially increased, indicating that mothers don't reduce their maternal input after siblicide has occurred. Also, facultative siblicide can evolve when the fitness benefits gained after the removal of a sibling by the dominant offspring, exceeds the costs acquired in terms of decreasing that sibling's inclusive fitness from the death of its sibling.

Some mammals sometimes commit siblicide for the purpose of gaining a larger portion of the parent's care. In spotted hyenas, pups of the same sex exhibit siblicide more often than male-female twins. Sex ratios may be manipulated in this way and the dominant status of a female and transmission of genes may be ensured through a son or daughter which inherits this solely, receiving much more parental nursing and decreased sexual competition.

Siblicidal "survival of the fittest" is also exhibited in parasitic wasps, which lay multiple eggs in a host, after which the strongest larva kills its rival sibling. Another example is when mourning cloak larvae will eat non-hatched eggs.

In sand tiger sharks, the first embryo to hatch from its egg capsule kills and consumes its younger siblings while still in the womb.

=== In humans ===
Siblicide in humans can also manifest itself in the form of murder. In humans, siblicide is generally called fratricide and sororicide. In humans, this type of killing (siblicide) is rarer than other types of killings.

Genetic relatedness may be an important moderator of conflict and homicide among family members, including siblings. Siblings may be less likely to intentionally kill a full sibling than a sibling-in-law (e.g., a brother-in-law). The evolutionary cost of killing a sibling is much higher than the evolutionary fitness costs associated with the death of a genetically unrelated person, because killing unrelated person does not lessen the prevalence of the killer's genes in the gene pool, whereas killing a genetically related person does.

Siblicide was found to be more common in early to middle adulthood as opposed to adolescence. The siblings' birth order has no overall effect, although at a young age, the older sibling is more likely to kill the younger sibling.

== See also ==
- Fratricide, the killing of a brother
- Infanticide (zoology), a related behaviour
- Intrauterine cannibalism
- Nazca booby (displays obligate siblicide)
- Parent–offspring conflict
- Sibling abuse
- Sibling rivalry
- Sororicide, the killing of a sister
