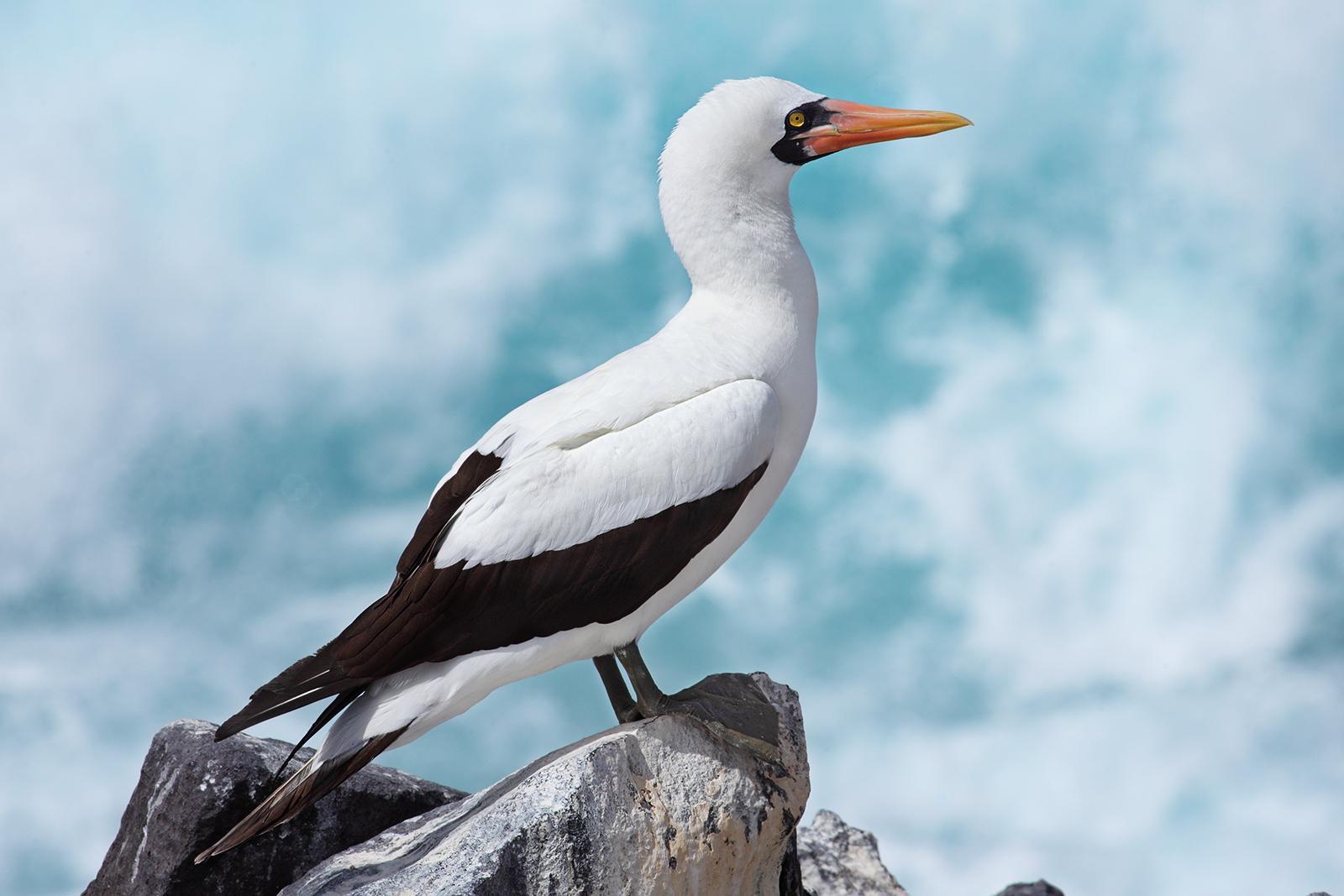
- Adult on Española Island, Galapagos Islands

Conservation status
- Least Concern (IUCN 3.1)

Scientific classification
- Kingdom: Animalia
- Phylum: Chordata
- Class: Aves
- Order: Suliformes
- Family: Sulidae
- Genus: Sula
- Species: S. granti

Binomial name
- Sula granti Rothschild, 1902

= Nazca booby =

Species of bird

The Nazca booby (Sula granti) is a large seabird of the booby family, Sulidae, native to the eastern Pacific. First described by Walter Rothschild in 1902, it was long considered a subspecies of the masked booby until recognised as distinct genetically and behaviorally in 2002. It has a typical sulid body shape, with a long pointed orange-yellow bill, long neck, aerodynamic body, long slender wings and pointed tail. The adult is bright white with black and white wings, a black tail and a dark face mask.

== Taxonomy ==
Walter Rothschild organised and sent an expedition to the Galapagos Islands in 1897 to collect and review the animal life there. He wrote of a distinctive booby there, which he and William Robert Ogilvie-Grant diagnosed as the Peruvian booby (Sula variegata), then only known from juvenile plumage. Later, in 1902, Rothschild named it a new species, Sula granti. Rothschild later reclassified as a subspecies of the masked booby.

In 1998, Pitman and colleagues observed that Nazca boobies on Clipperton Island did not interbreed with masked boobies there.

The genus Sula was previously placed in the order Pelecaniformes, but recently was collected in the family Sulidae and order Suliformes, together with 8 other genera. The Nazca booby was considered conspecific with the masked booby but was reassigned to a separate species based on mitochondrial DNA analyses. It is likely to have diverged 400,000-500,000 years ago.

== Description ==
The species has a yellow iris, orange and pinkish beak, black facial skin in the form of a mask, and grey feet. Adults present white plumage with black tips of the wings and tail. The female is bigger and heavier than the male, has a slightly differently colored beak, and squawks while the male whistles. Chicks are snow white and fluffy, plumage changing to grey along with beak and feet upon fledging.

== Distribution and habitat ==
The species occurs in the eastern Pacific from the islands in Baja California to the Galápagos Islands and the Isla de la Plata in Ecuador and Malpelo in Colombia. Individuals have been recorded as vagrants in the western Pacific, including near Waigeo in Indonesia, and off north-western Australia.

== Ecology ==
=== Feeding ===
The Nazca booby preys on small fish caught by diving at high speed from flight into the ocean. The main food species is South American pilchard, but also take flying fish, anchovies and squid, especially during the El Niño events, when sardine numbers are low. Because of their sexual dimorphism, females tend to feed on bigger prey and dive deeper.

=== Reproduction ===
The Nazca booby nests near cliffs on bare ground with little to no vegetation. The male chooses and defends a territory, then enters into courtship to attract females.

Like many seabirds, the species has a long lifespan combined with low annual reproduction and long periods of development in the young. Clutch size is one or two eggs, due to the low hatching success, however when 2 eggs are laid and they both hatch, it is common for only one of the chicks to survive. Usually, whichever is the first to hatch is the one that survives.

While many species of birds regulate egg temperature via an incubation patch, a layer of bare skin that allows birds to transmit heat into their eggs, the Suliformes instead use the skin on their webbed feet in addition to heat transferred from the breast. The feet are heavily vascularized, especially during the nesting period. Both the male and the female show parental care. Usually the chick that hatches first is bigger and becomes aggressive towards its sibling, excluding it from feeding and eventually starving it.

The energy investment on the parent's part is very high, so their metabolic rates change during the nesting season. This causes both parents to lose similar amounts of body weight and suffer a decline in their immune system activity. This adjustment does not take place when the parents decide not to nest, a decision that is mostly driven by food availability, which in turn depends on ocean current and climate patterns such as those driven by the El Niño oscillation.

Siblicide has been well studied in this species; the first chick is born around five days before the second and is larger and stronger by the time the second is born. It drags its younger sibling out of the nest. Field experiments in the Galapagos demonstrated that the boobies can manage to feed two chicks without too much difficulty. This raises questions as to the origin of the phenomenon.

=== Parasites ===
The vampire ground finch sometimes feeds on the blood of the Nazca booby.

== Conservation ==
The Nazca booby is classified as Least Concern by the IUCN. Although populations are thought to decrease to some extent, this decline is not strong enough to require classification in a threat category. Some of the factors that influence the decrease of populations are overfishing and marine pollution.

== Gallery ==
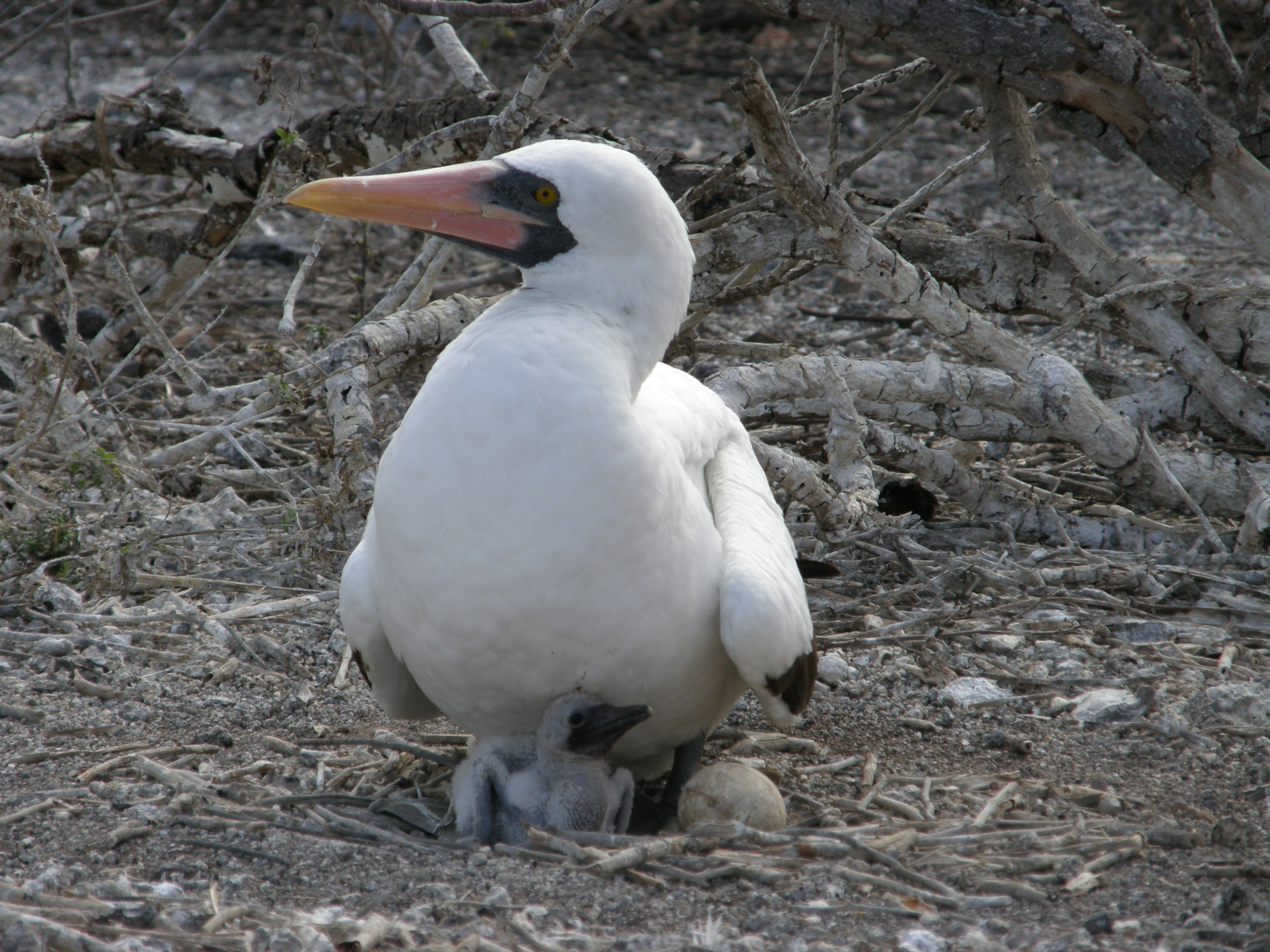
Adult with chick and unhatched egg

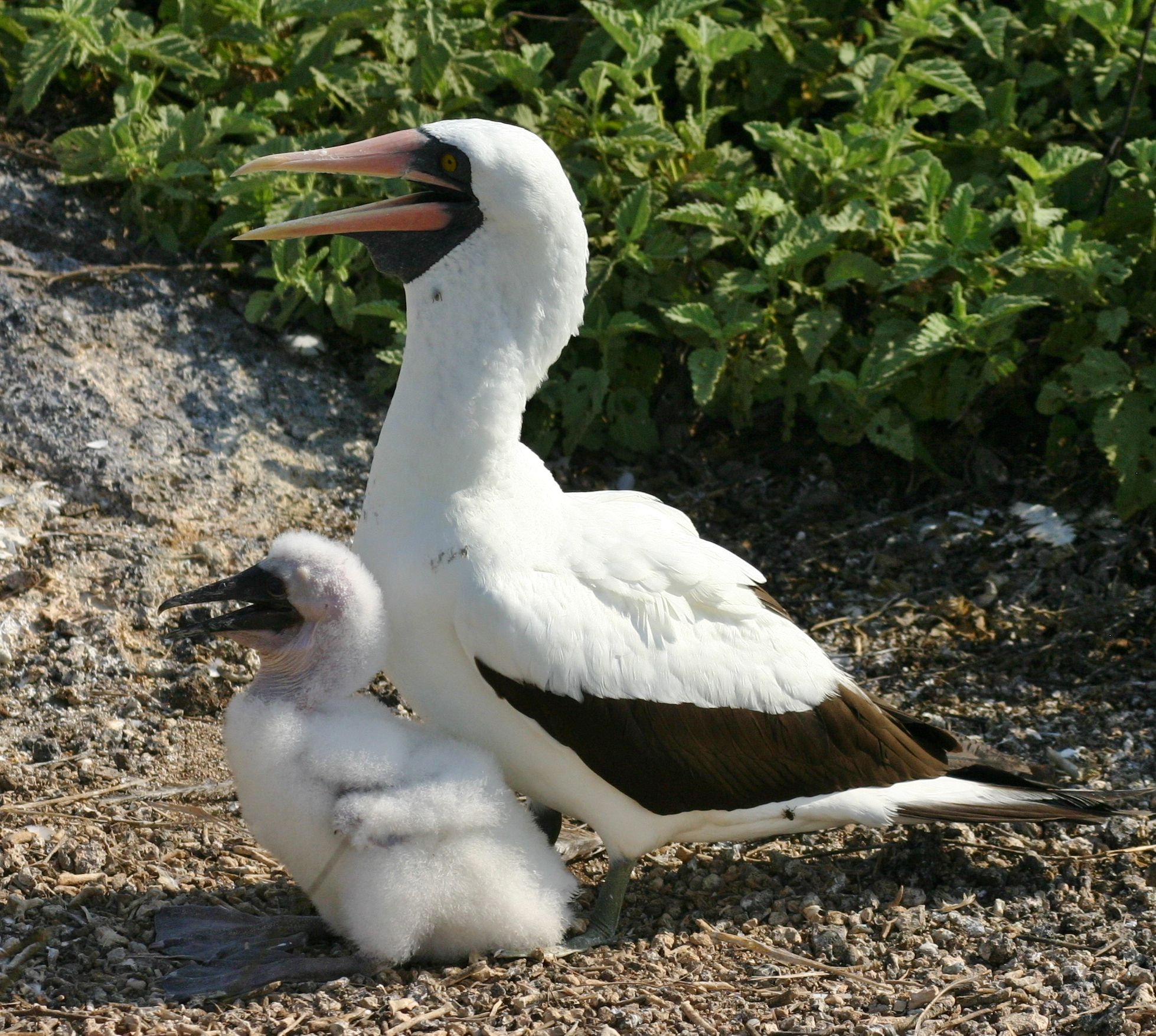
Adult with chick

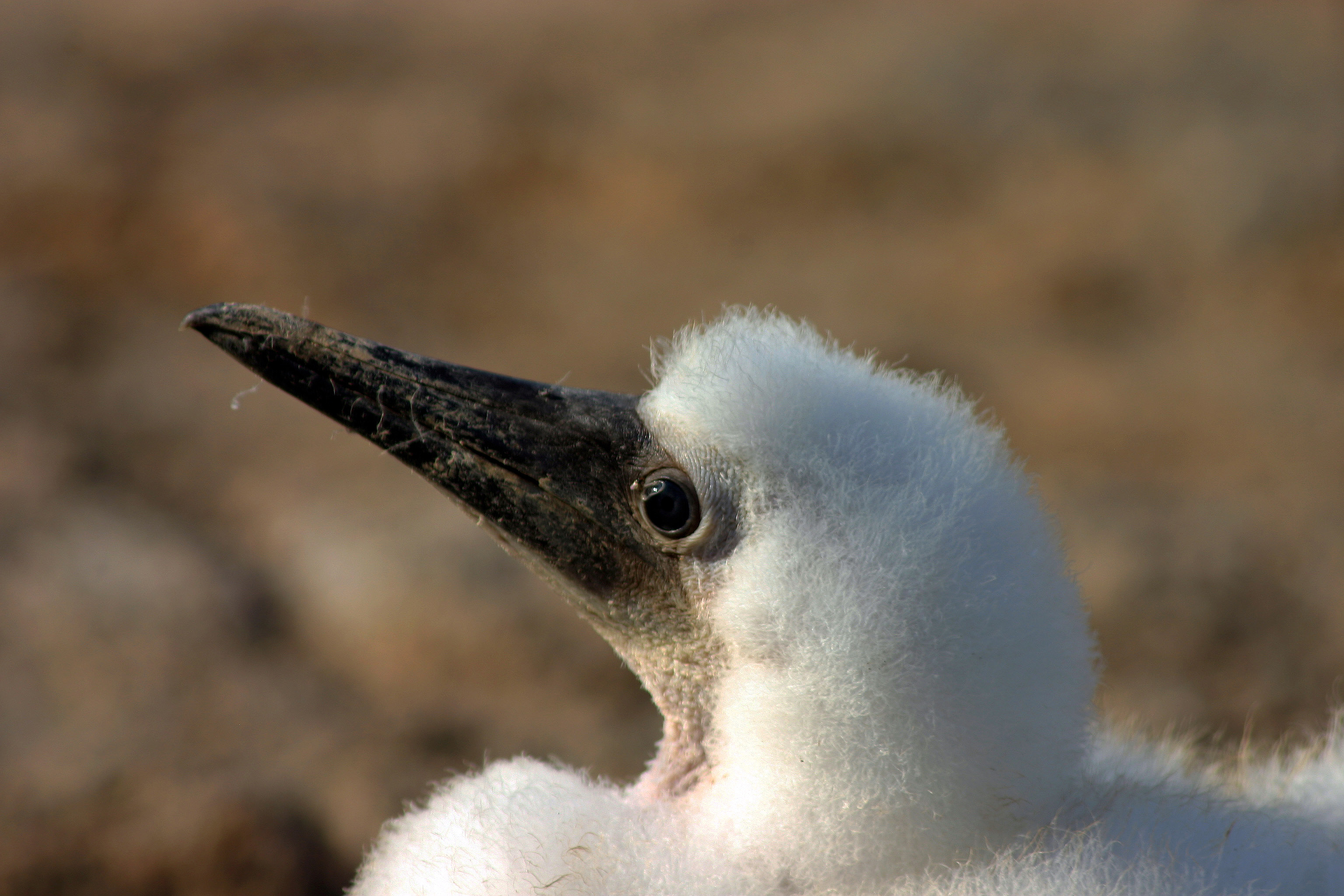
Juvenile

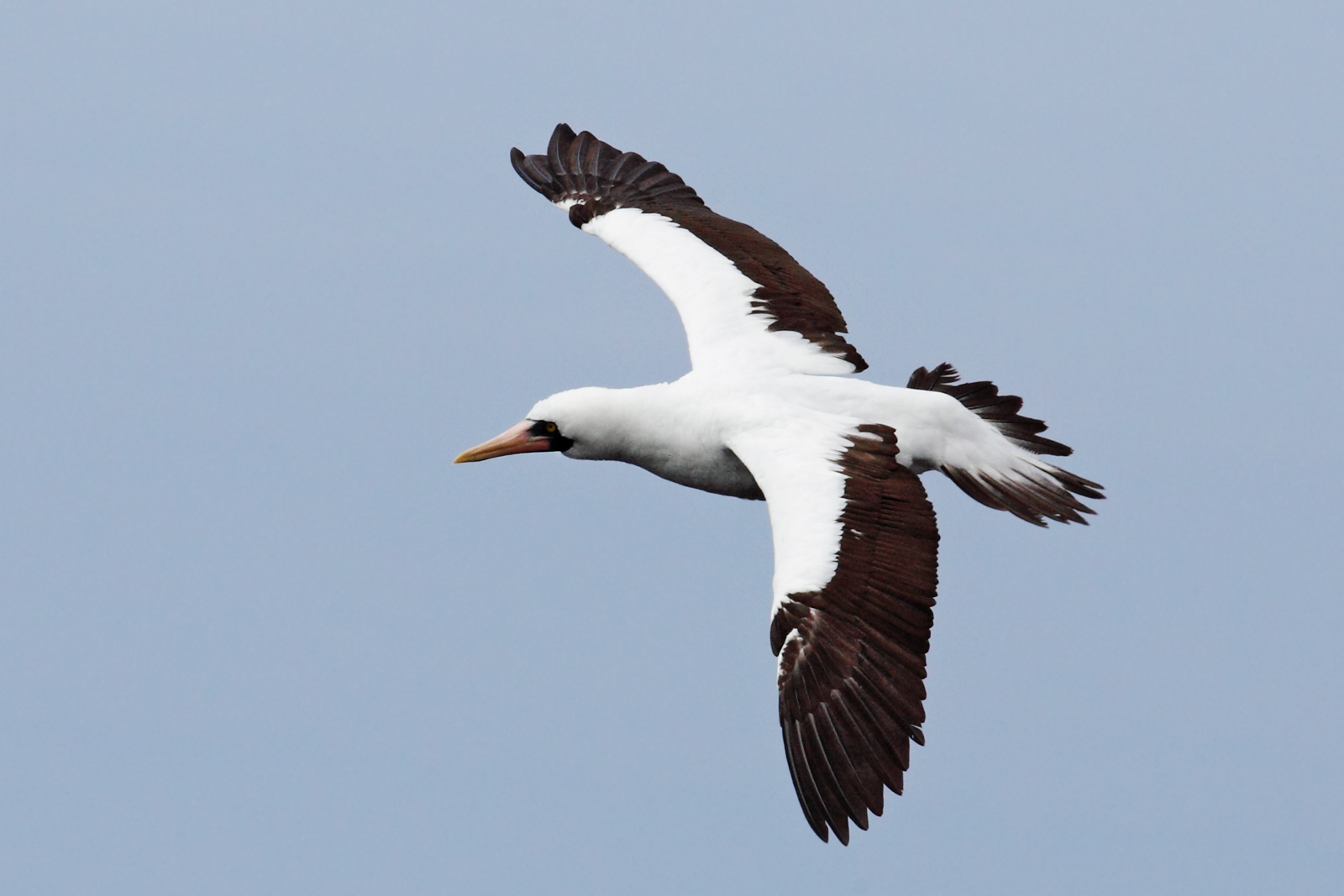
Dorsal view

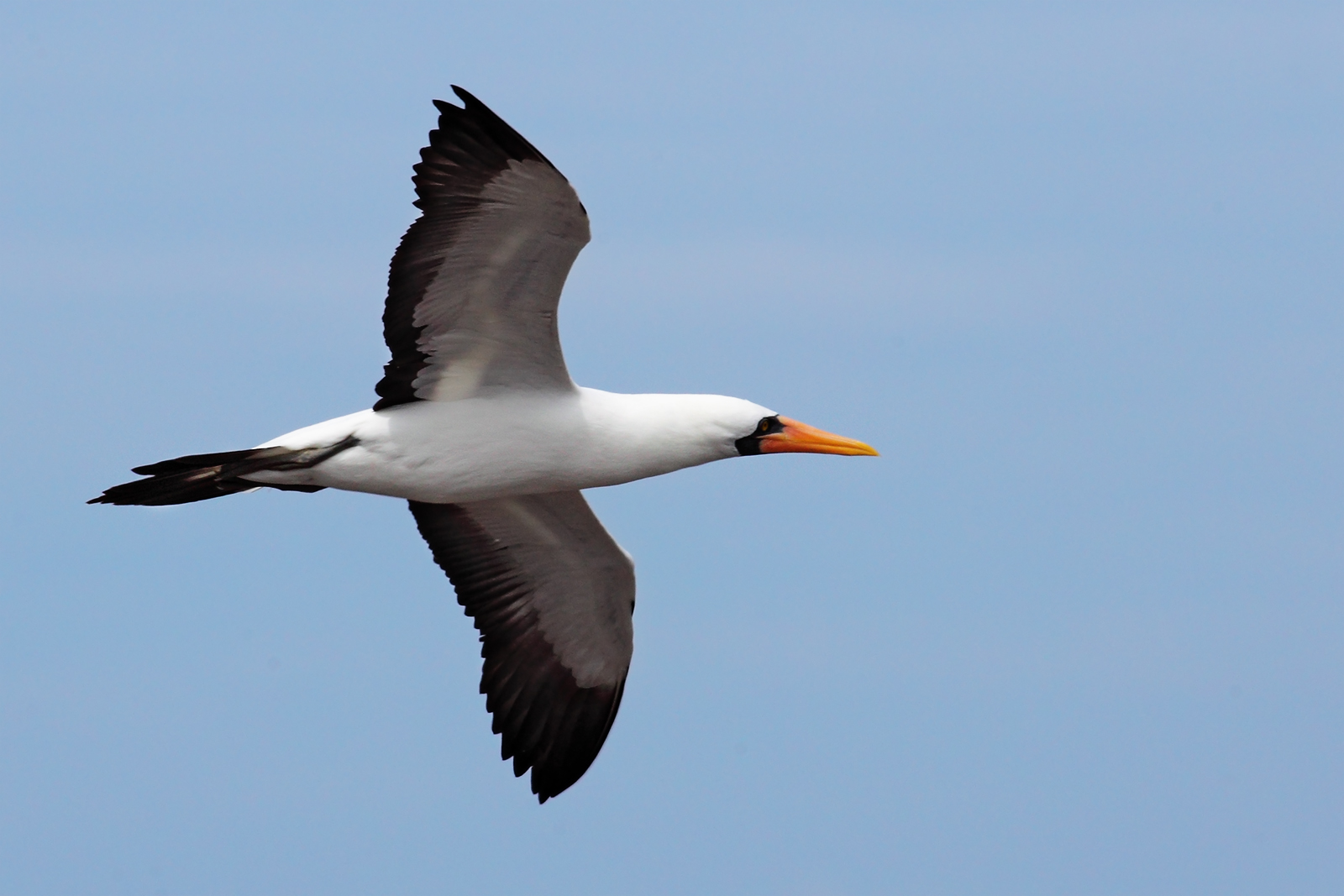
Ventral view

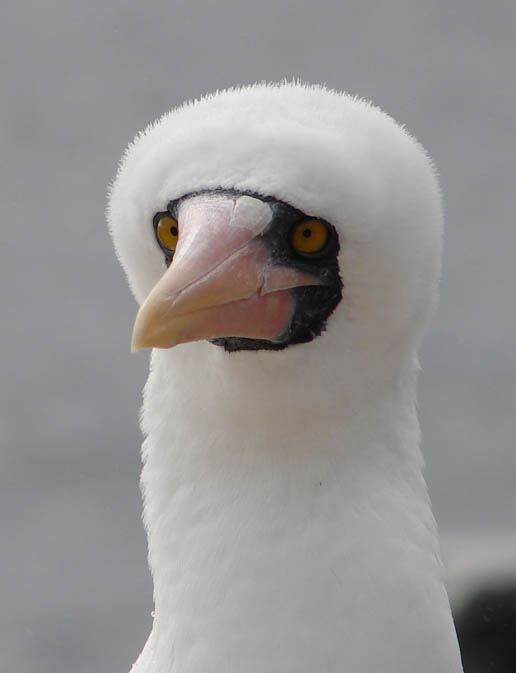
Portrait
