= Hachijō =

Hachijō can refer to:

== Hachijō in Tokyo, Japan ==
- The island Hachijōjima (八丈島)
- The town Hachijō, Tokyo, within Tokyo, Japan, which governs Hachijōjima and Hachijōkojima.
- Hachijo dialects, the dialects of the Japanese language native to these islands

== Hachijō in Kyoto, Japan ==
Hachijō (八条 or 八條) literally means eighth street in Japanese.

- Hachijō Street (八条通, Hachijō-dori)—a numbered east–west street in Kyoto, which runs just south of Kyoto Station
- Hachijō family (八条家, Hachijōke)—a Japanese kuge family descended from the Fujiwara Hokke (藤原北家)

== Ships ==
- Hachijo (八丈), a Japanese Navy Shimushu-class escort ship in commission between 1940 and 1948.
- JS Hachijō (はちじょう), a JMSDF Yaeyama-class minesweeper in commission between 1994 and 2017.
