= Hachijō language =

Japonic language

Hachijō
- 島言葉 sima kotoba
- Pronunciation: [ɕima kotoba]
- Native to: Japan
- Region: Southern Izu Islands and the Daitō Islands
- Native speakers: <1,000 (2011)
- Language family: Japonic: Insular; Japanese?; Hachijō
- Early forms: Proto-Japonic: Old Japanese?; Eastern Old Japanese
- Writing system: Japanese writing system (katakana, hiragana, rōmaji)

Language codes
- ISO 639-3: –
- ISO 639-6: hhjm
- Glottolog: hach1239
- ELP: Hachijo
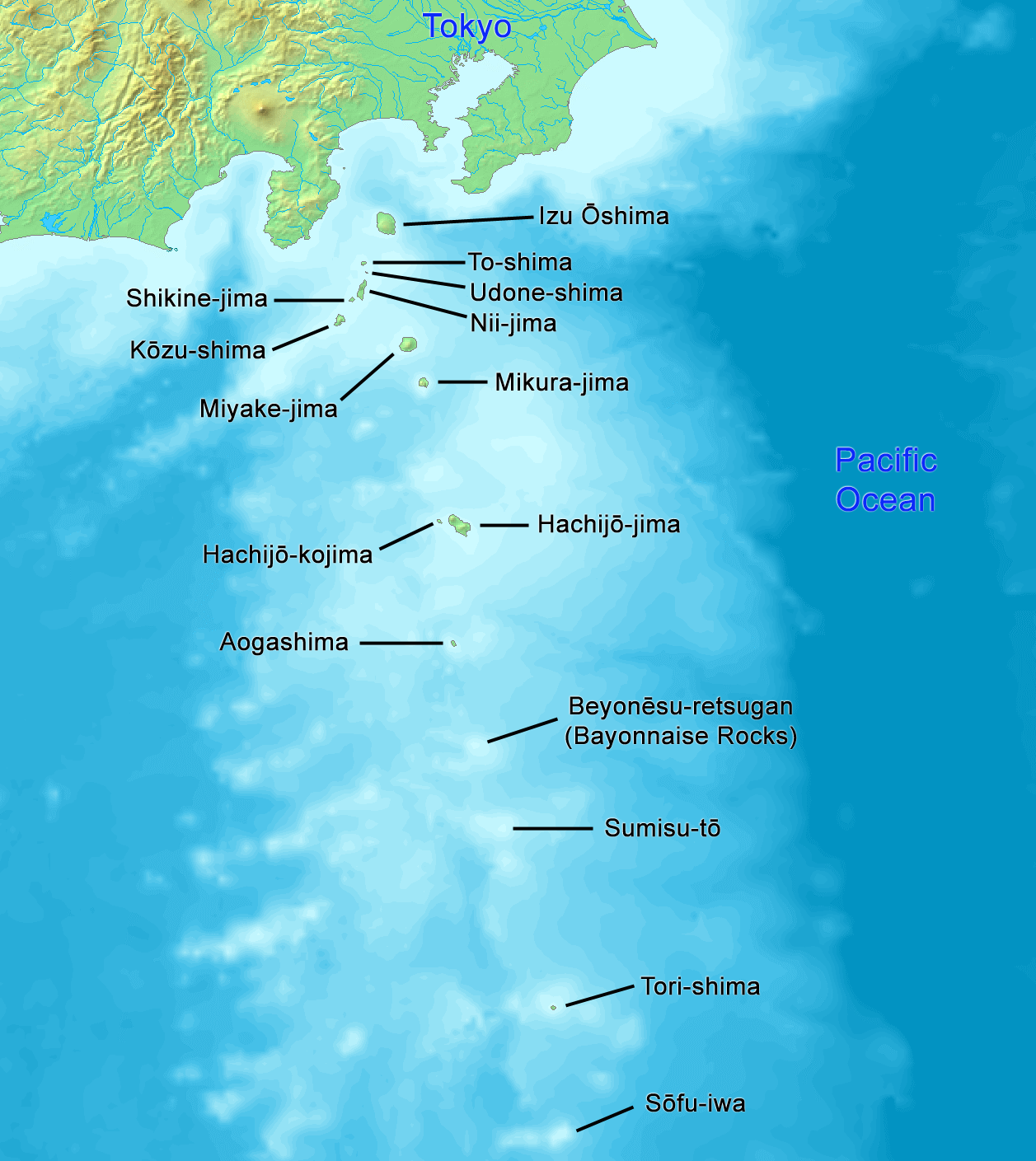
- Location of the Izu Islands

The small group of Hachijō dialects (八丈方言, Hachijō hōgen), natively called Shima Kotoba (島言葉; [ɕima kotoba], "island speech"), are, depending on classification, either one of the most divergent forms of Japanese, or a separate Japonic language (alongside mainland Japanese, Northern Ryukyuan, and Southern Ryukyuan). Hachijō is currently spoken on two of the Izu Islands south of Tokyo (Hachijō-jima and the smaller Aogashima) as well as on the Daitō Islands of Okinawa Prefecture, which were settled from Hachijō-jima in the Meiji era. It was also previously spoken on the island of Hachijō-kojima, which is now abandoned. Based on the criterion of mutual intelligibility, Hachijō may be considered a distinct Japonic language, rather than a dialect of Japanese.

Hachijō is considered to be a descendant of Eastern Old Japanese, retaining several unique grammatical and phonetic features recorded in dialect poems from Eastern Japan ("Azuma") in the 8th-century Man'yōshū and the Fudoki of Hitachi Province.

Hachijō also has lexical similarities with the dialects of Kyushu and even the Ryukyuan languages; it is not clear if these indicate that the southern Izu islands were settled from that region, if they are loans brought by sailors traveling among the southern islands, or if they might be independent retentions from Old Japanese.

Hachijō is a moribund language with a small and dwindling population of primarily elderly speakers. Since at least 2009, the town of Hachijō has supported efforts to educate its younger generations about the language through primary school classes, karuta games, and Hachijō-language theater productions. Nevertheless, native speakers are estimated to number in the "low hundreds," and younger generations are not learning or using the language at home.

== Classification and dialects ==
The Izu Islands dialects of Hachijō are classified into eight groups according to the various historical villages within Hachijō Subprefecture. On Hachijō-jima, these are Ōkagō, Mitsune, Nakanogō, Kashitate, and Sueyoshi; on Hachijō-kojima, these were Utsuki and Toriuchi; and the village of Aogashima is its own group. The dialects of Ōkagō and Mitsune are very similar, as are those of Nakanogō and Kashitate, while the Aogashima and Sueyoshi dialects are distinct from these two groups. The Utsuki and Toriuchi dialects have not been subcategorized within Hachijō, though the Toriuchi dialect has been noted to be very similar to the Ōkagō dialect in phonology. The dialect(s) of the Daitō Islands also remain uncategorized.

The Hachijō language and its dialects are classified by John Kupchik and the National Institute for Japanese Language and Linguistics (NINJAL), respectively, within the Japonic family as follows:

- Proto-Japonic
  - Proto-Japanese
    - Eastern Old Japanese
      - Hachijō language
        - Ōkagō & Mitsune dialects (Downhill dialects)
        - Nakanogō & Kashitate dialects (Uphill dialects)
        - Sueyoshi dialect
        - Aogashima dialect
    - Central Old Japanese (including Western Old Japanese)
      - Japanese language
  - Proto-Ryukyuan
    - Ryukyuan languages

The dialects of Aogashima and Utsuki are quite distinct from the other varieties (and each other). The Aogashima dialect exhibits slight grammatical differences from other varieties, as well as noticeable lexical differences. The Utsuki dialect, on the other hand, is lexically similar to the Toriuchi dialect and those of Hachijō-jima, but has undergone several unique sound shifts such as the elimination of the phonemes /s/ and /ɾ/; the loss of the latter is referred to as being sitagirecjaQcja "cut-tongued" by those of other villages, or citagije in Utsuki.

The dialects of Hachijō-jima are, like its villages, often referred as being "Uphill" (坂上, sakaue) or "Downhill" (坂下, sakashita). The villages of Ōkagō and Mitsune in the northwest are Downhill, while the villages of Nakanogō, Kashitate, and Sueyoshi in the south are Uphill—though the Sueyoshi dialect is not particularly close to those of the other "Uphill" villages. Therefore, the Sueyoshi dialect is often excluded from the term "Uphill dialects."

As the number of remaining speakers of Hachijō as a whole is unknown, the numbers of remaining speakers of each dialect are also unknown. Since the abandonment of Hachijō-kojima in 1969, some speakers of the Utsuki and Toriuchi dialects have moved to Hachijō-jima and continue to speak the Hachijō language, though their speech seems to have converged with that of the Downhill dialects. As late as 2009, the Toriuchi dialect had at least one remaining speaker, while the Utsuki dialect had at least five.

== Phonology ==
=== Phonotactics ===
Like Standard Japanese, Hachijō syllables are (C)(j)V(C), that is, with an optional syllable onset C, optional medial glide /j/, a mandatory syllable nucleus V, and an optional coda /N/ or /Q/. The coda /Q/ can only be present word-medially, and syllable nuclei can be short or long vowels.

The medial glide /j/ represents palatalization of the consonant it follows, which also involves a change in place or manner of articulation for certain consonants. Like in Japanese, these changes can also be analyzed phonemically using separate sets of palatalized and non-palatalized consonants. However, from a morphological and cross-dialectal perspective, it is more straightforward to treat palatalized consonants as sequences of consonants and /j/, as is done in this article, following the phonemic analysis made by Kaneda (2001). Furthermore, when a vowel begins with the close front vowel /i/, the preceding consonant (if any) becomes palatalized just as if a medial /j/ were present.

Hachijō contrasts three syllable weights depending on their rimes:

- Light syllables end in a short vowel with no coda (e.g., ko).
- Heavy syllables have either a short vowel with a coda (e.g., koN), or a long vowel with no coda (e.g., koo).
- Superheavy syllables have both a long vowel and a coda (e.g., kooN).

Unlike light and heavy syllables, superheavy syllables are strongly avoided in Hachijō, and they are forbidden outright in most verbal inflections. Where they would occur, they are generally resolved by deletion of the coda or by shortening of the long vowel. Where the latter occurs, it can be written with a tie or as a short vowel, e.g., ⟨kogo͡oN⟩ or ⟨kogoN⟩ "in this way"; the former practice will be followed here. Though these shortened vowels are pronounced the same length as short vowels, they still follow the dialectal correspondences for long vowels (listed below).

Finally, there are a small number of words that contain N as a syllable nucleus instead of a vowel, such as NNmakja "tasty" [m̩ː.ma.kʲa] (stem NNma-, cognate to Japanese 美味い uma-i).

=== Vowels ===
There are five short vowels found in all varieties of Hachijō:

Short Vowels in Hachijō
	Front	Central	Back
Close	i		u (Note: The vowel /u/ is typically unrounded [ɯ] or compressed [ɯᵝ], as in Japanese, but will be denoted as [u] here.)
Mid	e		o
Open		a	

Many of Hachijō’s long vowels are properly diphthongs, though the majority of them vary in quality based on region, being long monophthongs in some dialects and diphthongs in others. Therefore, in this article, the term "long vowel" will be used to include diphthongs as well. There are relatively straightforward correspondences between the dialectsʼ long vowels:

Long Vowel Correspondences
This Article	ii	uu	aa	ee	ei	oo	ou	aĭ	uĭ	oĭ
Kashitate	iː	uː	aː	ia~jaː (Note: For speakers where the first component of these diphthongs has shifted to [i] or a glide /j/, this shift generally triggers palatalization of the preceding consonant. Palatalization is more prevalent in the Kashitate dialect than the Nakanogō dialect. These shifted vowels are often transcribed as ⟨ea⟩, ⟨ia⟩, or ⟨jaa⟩.)	iː~ɪː~e̝ː (Note: The vowels [ɪ] and [e̝] are often transcribed as ⟨i⟩ and ⟨e⟩~⟨ė⟩, respectively.)	oɐ (Note: The vowel [ɐ] is often transcribed as ⟨a⟩.)	ʊː~oː (Note: The vowel [ʊ] is often transcribed as ⟨o⟩ or ⟨u⟩.)	ai	ui	oi
Nakanogō	iː	uː	aː	ea~jaː	ɪː~e̝ː~eː	oɐ	ʊː~oː	ai	ui	oi
Sueyoshi	iː	uː	aː	eː	iː	aː	oː	ai	ui	oi
Mitsune	iː	uː	aː	eː~ei (Note: Descriptions of the Mitsune dialect differ as to whether speakers distinguish /eː/ and /oː/ from /ei/ and /ou/. Kaneda (2001) states that they are distinct, separating them in his transcription, whereas NINJAL (1950) lists only the pronunciations [ei] and [ou] for the Mitsune dialect.)	ei	oː~ou	ou	ai	ui	oi
Ōkagō	iː	uː	aː	eː	eː	oː	oː	ai	ui	oi
Toriuchi	iː	uː	aː	eː	eː	oː	oː	ai	ui	oi
Utsuki	iː	uː	aː	eː	ɐi	oː	ɐu	ɐi	ui	oi
Aogashima	iː	uː	aː	eː	ei~eː	oː	ɔu (Note: Aogashima [ɔu] is often transcribed ⟨au⟩ or ⟨ao⟩.)	ai	ui	oi
Minami Daitō	iː	uː	aː	eː	(eː?)	(oː?)	oː	ai	ui	oi

The long vowels aĭ, uĭ, and oĭ are comparatively rare, arising mainly from contractions.

Lastly, there are a very small number of discourse markers that contain nasal vowels, such as oĩ "Oh my!" and hõõ "Oh?" or "Oho!"

=== Consonants ===
Hachijō contains roughly the same consonants as Standard Japanese, with most consonants able to be followed by all vowels as well as by the medial glide /j/.

Consonant Phonemes in Hachijō
		Bilabial	Coronal		Dorsal	Glottal
		Bilabial	plain	sibilant	Dorsal	Glottal
Nasal		m	n			
Plosive/ Affricate	voiceless	p	t	t͡s ⟨c⟩	k	
Plosive/ Affricate	voiced	b (Note: In the Utsuki dialect, intervocalic b /b/ is sometimes realized as a bilabial fricative [β].)	d	d͡z ⟨z⟩ (Note: The difference between affricate pronunciations [d͡z~d͡ʑ] and fricative pronunciations [z~ʑ] of z~zj is not distinctive, and they are highly variant. This article will consistently use the affricate notation.)	ɡ	
Fricative				s (Note: The phoneme s /s/ has merged into c /t͡s/ in the Utsuki dialect.)		h (Note: When h /h/ is followed by the close back vowel /u/, it is realized as bilabial [ɸ], whereas when palatalized, it is realized as palatal [ç]. In addition, some speakers of the Nakanogō dialect also retain a bilabial [ɸ] before the low vowel /a/, such as in ha [ɸa] "tooth" and hara [ɸaɾa] "belly". In all other cases, /h/ is realized as [h].)
Liquid		w (Note: The phonemes /j/ and /w/ phonetically disappear if they are followed by /i/ and /u/, respectively, such as in the variant jii [iː] of the allative case particle i~jii.)	ɾ ⟨r⟩ (Note: The phoneme r /ɾ/ has been lost in the Utsuki dialect, merging into j /j/ or a zero consonant depending on the phonemic environment. Specifically, Common Hachijō /ɾa, ɾo, ɾj/ usually become Utsuki [ja, jo, j]; /ɾi, ɾu/, non-coalescing [i, u]; and /ɾe/, either [je] or non-coalescing [e].) (Note: The phoneme r /ɾ/ is uncommon word-initially (most noticeably in Sino-Japonic vocabulary), but tends to be merged into d /d/ in that position, e.g., Hachijō deeneN versus Japanese 来年 rainen "next year.")		j	
Special morae		/N/, (Note: The phoneme N /N/ is only found in the syllable coda and corresponds to the syllable onsets m and n. Its default realization is dorsal [ɴ~ŋ], but if it is immediately followed by an obstruent or nasal consonant, then it assimilates to the place of articulation of that consonant.) /Q/ (Note: The phoneme Q /Q/ represents gemination of the following consonant, just as the character っ does in Japanese hiragana. Unlike in Standard Japanese, Hachijō Q can be found preceding not only voiceless obstruents, but voiced ones as well.)				

=== Phonological processes ===
In addition to the variations described above, Hachijō also exhibits a handful of other conditioned sound alternations:

==== Affrication of /t/ and /d/ ====
When followed by the high vowels /u/ or /i/ (short or long), the plosive consonants t /t/ and d /d/ become affricates, merging into c /t͡s/ and z /d͡z/ respectively, which is also reflected in orthography (as shown here). This change happens in addition to the palatalization of coronal consonants described below.

==== Palatalization of coronal consonants ====
When followed by the vowel /i/ (short or long), or when combined with the medial glide /j/, the coronal nasal n as well as all coronal obstruents—namely, t, d, c, z, s—change from an alveolar place of articulation to a palatal one. This change happens in addition to the affrication of t and d mentioned previously. Thus, t-j and c-j become cj [t͡ɕ], d-j and z-j become zj [d͡ʑ], s-j becomes sj [ɕ], and n-j becomes nj [ɲ].

The consonant j /j/ is already palatal in articulation, reducing any would-be sequences of **/jj/ to simply /j/.

Lastly, the coronal affricates c and z have a tendency to be sporadically palatalized to cj and zj; compare Utsuki mizoma [mʲid͡zoma] and Kashitate mizjoma [mʲid͡ʑoma] "sewer, drainage," cognate to Japanese 溝 mizo "ditch."

==== Vowel coalescence ====
Hachijō generally disallows vocalic segments in hiatus except for in the long vowels listed above. Where such a hiatus would appear (from compounding, affixation, consonant elision, etc.), coalescence generally occurs instead. For combinations of two vowels, the following chart gives a general overview:

	-e	-i	-o	-u	-wa (Note: Synchronic combinations of a vowel with the topic-marking particle wa are usually blocked by morpheme boundaries.)
a-	ee	ee	oo	oo	awa, oo
e-	ei (Note: It is noteworthy that the combinations e-e and o-o yield ei and ou, not **ee and **oo.)	ei	ei	ei	ewa, ja
i-	je	ii	jo (Note: In the Aogashima and Sueyoshi dialects, modern combinations of i-o now yield ii. However, etymological *io have regularly yielded jo, such as in sjo "tide" ← Old Japanese 潮 sipo.)	ju	iwa, ja
o-	ei	ei	ou	ou	owa, oo
u-	ii	ii	uu	uu	uwa, uu

Noteworthy irregularities or exceptions include:

- a-wo → ou, seen in the inflection of Class 1.1Aʼ verbs whose stems end in ...aw-, such as utaw- "to sing" → attributive *utaw-o → utou.
- e-wa → a, seen on personal pronouns with the topic-marking -wa in some dialects (ware-wa → wara).
- o-wa → a, seen in the verbal inflection of the stative -ar- (*-arowa → -ara), copula dara (*darowa → dara), new-type negative -Nn(ak)- (*-Nnakowa → -Nnaka), etc.

And although these rules are usually followed etymologically as well, there are some exceptions:

- *uwa → a, seen in words like *kuwa → ka "hoe" (related to Standard Japanese 鍬 kuwa).
- *ie → ei, seen in several Class 2 verbs such as *kierowa → keirowa "to disappear" (related to Old Japanese 消ゆ ki_{1}yu, ki_{1}ye-).
- *ue → ei, seen in words like *suerowa → seirowa "to set" (related to Standard Japanese 据える sueru).
- *ui → ei, seen in words like *uttui → uQcei "the day before yesterday" (related to Standard Japanese 一昨日 ototoi).
- *ei → ee, seen in a single word: *tame(s)ite → tameete "attempting" (participle form of tamesowa "to attempt," related to Japanese 試す tamesu).
- *owa → ou, seen in a single word: *kowasowa → kousowa "to destroy" (related to Japanese 壊す kowasu).

Coalescence can be blocked by leveling and reversed or altered by influence from other dialects or mainland Japanese.

===== Non-coalescence =====
As an exception to the vowel coalescence rules given above, there are special situations where the vowel [i] can diphthongize with another short vowel a, o, or u without coalescing with it, forming the long vowels aĭ, oĭ, or uĭ instead of the expected ee, ei, or ii. Many notable examples of this occur when the light syllable re /ɾe/ is contracted to [i], such as in waĭra "we" (from warera) and nomaraĭdou "despite drinking" (from nomararedou). The frequency of such contracted forms depends on the dialect and individual.

Non-coalescing vowels are comparatively common in the Utsuki dialect, as [i], [u], and [e] often occur in place of other dialectsʼ ri, ru, and re due to the loss of the phoneme /ɾ/ word-medially. As a result, former ari and aru have merged into the reflexes [ɐi] and [ɐu] of Common Hachijō ei and ou. Compare the following vocabulary:

Common Hachijō	Mitsune Pronunciation	Utsuki Pronunciation	Meaning
ozjarijare	[od͡ʑaɾʲijaɾe]	[od͡ʑɐijɐe]	"welcome!"
taru	[taɾu]	[tɐu]	"barrel"
marubara	[maɾubara]	[mɐubaː]	"died," "has died"
okireba	[okʲiɾeba]	[okʲɪeba]	"when (he) awakens"
kabure	[kabuɾe]	[kabʊe]	"wear (the hat)!"

==== Consonant gemination ====
The majority of consonants undergo no special changes when geminated, merely becoming longer, e.g.: t [t] → Qt [tt]. However, there are a few main exceptions. These first exceptions usually arise by the prefixing of /Q/-final suffixes onto words:

- Gemination of h: When an h is made geminate, it becomes Qp [pp]—for example, oQ- (intensifier) + hesowa "to push" → oQpesowa "to push."
- Gemination of n and m: When an n or m is made geminate, it becomes Nn [nn] or Nm [mm], respectively—for example, hiQ- (intensifier) + magarowa "to bend" → hiNmagarowa "to bend."
- Gemination of s: When an s or sj is made geminate, an excrescent [t] causes it to become Qc [tt͡s] or Qcj [tt͡ɕ], respectively—for example, hiQ- (intensifier) + simerowa "to tie" → hiQcimerowa "to tie." This feature occurs in all dialects except for Sueyoshi, which has Qs [ss] and Qsj [ɕɕ] in these cases.

Lastly, in the Uphill dialects (and occasionally for other dialect speakers as well), a sound shift has occurred wherein /N/ has become /Q/ when followed by a voiced obstruent:

- Special gemination of b, d, g, z: In the Uphill dialects, etymological Nb, Nd, Ng, and Nz have often changed into geminate Qb, Qd, Qg, and Qz. For example, the participle of jomowa "to read" in the Kashitate dialect is joQde [jodde] in contrast to most other dialectsʼ joNde [jonde].

==== Rendaku ====
Like all Japonic languages, Hachijō exhibits rendaku (連濁; "sequential voicing"), wherein word-initial voiceless obstruents alternate with voiced ones in some compounds. The alternation is straightforward in Hachijō:

Without Rendaku	p	h	t	c	s	k
With Rendaku	b		d	z		g

All other consonants are unaffected by rendaku.

== Grammar ==
Hachijō is head-final, left-branching, and topic-prominent; often omits nouns that can be understood from context; and has default subject–object–verb word order. Nouns do not exhibit grammatical gender, nor do they usually indicate grammatical number.

Hachijō preserves several grammatical features from Old Japanese—particularly Eastern Old Japanese (EOJ)—that are not reflected in Modern Standard Japanese, for example:

- Verbal adjectives use the attributive ending -ke, from EOJ. Contrast Western Old Japanese -ki_{1}, Modern Japanese ～い -i.
- Verbs use the attributive ending -o ~ -ro, from EOJ. Contrast Western Old Japanese and Modern Japanese -u ~ -ru.
- Verbs use the stative derivation -ar-, from EOJ. Contrast Western Old Japanese -e_{1}r-, obsolete in Modern Japanese.
- Verbs use the past tense -ci ~ -zi, from Old Japanese -si (attributive form of -ki_{1}). This affix is obsolete in Modern Japanese.
- Verbs use the conjectural extension -naw-, descended from EOJ -nam-. Contrast Western Old Japanese -ram-, Modern Japanese -rō.
- The existence verb arowa is used with all subjects, without the animate–inanimate (iru–aru) distinction made in Standard Japanese.
  - Relatedly, the verb irowa (cognate to Japanese iru) has only its original meaning of "to sit."
- The particles ga and no are both used to mark the nominative and genitive cases.
- Many interrogative particles are based on an-, such as ani "what," aNde "why," and aNsei "why." Contrast the Japanese cognates based on nan-: 何 nani "what," なんで nande "why," and なぜ naze "why".
- The Japonic grammatical phenomenon of kakari-musubi (係り結び; "hanging-tying") still occurs with the question particle ka (related to Japanese か ka) and the focus particles ka and koo (perhaps related to Japanese こそ koso). This phenomenon started disappearing in Japanese in Late Middle Japanese, and it was lost entirely in Standard Japanese around the Edo Period.
- Many cases of Proto-Japanese *e and *o are reflected as Hachijo e and o, as seen in EOJ. Contrast Western Old Japanese, which usually merged these vowels into i_{1} and u.

Hachijō has also had developments and innovations not found in Modern Standard Japanese:

- The final verb ending -u ~ -ru has been replaced by a new declarative -owa ~ -rowa for many uses.
- The participle (te-form) of k- and g-stem verbs end in -Qte and -Nde, in contrast to most Japanese dialectsʼ -ite and -ide.
- Several verb affixes have arisen based around an optative-like suffix -oosi, related in some way to the Middle Japanese optative ～ま欲し -(a)maosi.

== Vocabulary ==
Hachijō contains a large number of vocabulary words whose phonetic shapes are not predictable from their Japanese cognates. These differences often reflect forms Hachijō inherited from Eastern Old Japanese (rather than from mainland Japanese’s ancestor of Western-Central Old Japanese) or irregular sound changes in one or both languages.

Hachijō	Eastern OJ	Cognate(s)
nubur- "to climb"	–	上る nobor- (ModJ) no_{2}bor- (WOJ) nubuyuɴ (Okinawan)
horow- "pick up"	pirop-	拾う hirow- (ModJ) 拾ふ firof- (EMJ) pi_{1}rip- (WOJ) firiɴ ~ firiyuɴ (Okinawan) pʰurūruɴ (Nakijin Kunigami)
houm- "hold in the mouth"	popom-	含む fukum- "contain" (ModJ) pupum- (WOJ)
nogow- "wipe"	nogop-	拭う nuguw- (ModJ) 拭ふ nogof- (EMJ) nuguyuɴ (Okinawan)
ote- "to fall"	–	落ちる ochi- (ModJ) oti- (WOJ) *ote- (PR) ʔutiyuɴ (Okinawan)
ore- "to descend, to disembark"	–	降りる ori- (ModJ) ori- (WOJ) *ore- (PR) ʔuriyuɴ (Okinawan)
memezume "earthworm"	–	蚯蚓 mimizu (ModJ) mimidu (EMJ) *memezu (PR) mimiji (Okinawan)
asub- "to play"	–	遊ぶ asob- (ModJ) aso_{1}b- (WOJ) *asub- (PR) asibuɴ ~ ashibuɴ (Okinawan)
igok- "to work"	–	動く ugok- "to move" (ModJ) ugo_{1}k- (WOJ) *igok- (PR) ʔɴjuchuɴ, ʔɴjuk- (Okinawan)
kasjag- "to lean, to slant"	–	傾ぐ kashig- (ModJ) kashig-, katag- (Early ModJ)
kasik- "to cook by steaming or boiling"	–	炊ぐ kashig- (ModJ) kasik- (EMJ) kashichii "okowa" (Okinawan)
katog- "to bear"	–	担ぐ katsug- (ModJ) katug- (Early ModJ)
jo "fish"	–	魚 uo (ModJ) uwo ~ iwo (EMJ) *iyo (PR) ʔiyu (Okinawan) ɿɿu (Miyako)
hito, tecu ~ teQcu "one, one thing"	–	一 hito, 一つ hitotsu (ModJ) pi_{1}to_{2}, pi_{1}to_{2}tu (WOJ) *pito, *pitetu (PR) chu, tiitsi (Okinawan) pɿtu, pɿtiitsɿ (Miyako)

Hachijō also preserves vocabulary that has become obsolete in most Japanese dialects, such as:

Hachijō	Cognate(s)
magure- "to faint"	眩る magure- "to get dizzy" (LMJ)
heirak- "to hurt, to sting"	疼らく fifirak- "to tingle, to sting" (EMJ)
hotour- "to be hot"	熱る fotofor- ~ fotobor- "to emit heat" (EMJ)
sjo-ke "known"	著き siru-ki_{1} ~ (iti)siro_{1}-ki_{1} "known, evident" (WOJ)
nabure- "to hide"	隠る nabar- ~ namar- "to hide" (EMJ)
njow- "to groan"	呻吟ふ niyof- ~ niyob- "to groan" (EMJ)
kour- "to love" (Note: Has irregularly changed from a bigrade (二段, nidan) verb to a Class 1.1B verb, most likely via the Old Japanese attributive form *kop-uro being reanalyzed as kopur-o.)	恋ふ kofi- (EMJ) ko_{1}pi_{2}- (WOJ)

There are some words which do occur in standard Japanese, but with different meanings:

Hachijō	Japanese Cognate
jama "field"	山 yama "mountain"
gomi "firewood"	ゴミ gomi "trash"
oyako "relatives, kin"	親子 oyako "parent and child"
kowakja "tired, exhausted"	怖い kowai "scary, scared"
nikukja "ugly"	憎い nikui "detestable, difficult"
kamowa "to eat"	噛む kamu "to chew, to bite"
izimerowa "to scold"	苛める ijimeru "to tease, to bully"
heirowa "to shout, to cry out"	吠える hoeru "(of a dog) to bark, to howl"
jadorowa "to sleep (honorific)"	宿る yadoru "to stay the night"
marubowa "to die"	転ぶ marobu "to collapse, to fall down"

Lastly, Hachijō also has unique vocabulary words whose relationship to Japonic are unclear or unknown:

Hachijō	Meaning
togirowa	to invite, to call out to
kasurowa	to forget
deecikja	pretty, clean, tidy
kucukawasime	cicada
keebjoome	lizard
hjoura	lunch, midday meal
cube	roof
zokume	bull
abi	strawberry, raspberry

== See also ==
- Japanese language
- Japanese dialects
- Japanese phonology

== Bibliography ==
- Frellesvig, Bjarke (2010). A History of the Japanese language. Cambridge University Press. ISBN 978-1-107-40409-0.
- Iannucci, David J. (2019). The Hachijō Language of Japan: Phonology and Historical Development (PhD dissertation). University of Hawaiʻi at Mānoa.
- Kaneda, Akihiro [in Japanese] (2001). Hachijō-kata gen dōshi no kiso kenkyū 八丈方言動詞の基礎研究 [Basic Research on Verbs in the Hachijō Dialect]. 笠間書院 (Kasama Shoin Co., Ltd.). ISBN 978-4305702326.
- Kibe, Nobuko [in Japanese], ed. (2013), Hachijō-kata gen chōsa hōkoku-sho 八丈方言調査報告書 [Research Report on Hachijo Dialect] (PDF), Inter-University Research Institute Corporation
- Kupchik, John E. (2011). A Grammar of the Eastern Old Japanese Dialects (PhD dissertation). University of Hawaiʻi.
- NINJAL (1950). Hachijōjima no gengochōsa 八丈島の言語調査 [Language Survey of Hachijō-jima].
- Vovin, Alexander (2017). "Origins of the Japanese Language". Oxford Research Encyclopedia of Linguistics. Oxford University Press. doi:10.1093/acrefore/9780199384655.013.277. ISBN 978-0-19-938465-5.
- Vovin, Alexander (2009). A Descriptive and Comparative Grammar of Western Old Japanese, Part 2. Global Oriental. ISBN 978-1-905246-82-3.
