= Eastern Old Japanese =

Variety of Old Japanese

- Eastern provinces (hatched) in the 8th century
- Region: Eastern Japan
- Era: 4th–9th century
- Language family: Japonic: Old Japanese; Eastern Old Japanese
- Early form: Proto-Japonic

Language codes
- ISO 639-3: –

Eastern Old Japanese (abbreviated as EOJ; Japanese: 上代東国方言, 上代東国語) is a group of heterogenous varieties of Old Japanese, historically spoken in the east of Japan, in the area traditionally called Togoku or Azuma.

== Classification ==
Eastern Old Japanese constitutes a branch of the Japanese subgroup of the Japonic languages (Insular Japonic), with the other varieties of Old Japanese, which all descend from proto-Japanese (separate from Proto-Ryukyuan, following the classification used by Kupchik (2011).

== Attestations ==
Eastern Old Japanese is mainly attested through poems collected in several anthologies written during the 8th century:

- Man'yōshū (万葉集), in the fourteenth and twentieth volumes, as well as some poems from volume sixteen;
- Kokin wakashū (古今和歌集), of which a poem is written in this dialect (written during the Heian period);
- Fudoki (風土記);
- Azuma (asobi) uta (東遊び歌);
- Sakimori uta, however, this one is written with the spelling of Western Old Japanese.

All this would give a total of 242 short poems and one long poem according to Alexander Vovin (2014).

== Geographic distribution ==
This variety is geographically opposed to Western Old Japanese and Kyūshū Old Japanese. It was spoken to the east of Nara, the capital during the eponymous Nara period, approximately in the current Kantō region, Chūbu region and Tōhoku region, which was collectively referred to as Azuma.

=== Varieties ===
Eastern Old Japanese was not a unified variety but rather a collection of dialects. Their demarcation differs depending on the author.

For example, Bjarke Frellesvig (2010) distinguishes three dialect areas:

Northern
the provinces of Kazusa, Mutsu and Shimotsuke;
Central
the provinces of Hitachi, Kōzuke, Musashi, Sagami and Shimōsa; and
Southern
the provinces of Shinano, Suruga and Tōtōmi.

He states that these dialects form a continuum with the varieties of Nara Old Japanese, with North Eastern Old Japanese constituting the most divergent variety. However, the majority of songs and poems do not have information on their provenance.

John Kupchik (2023) refers to all of these varieties as Azuma Old Japanese, consisting of two dialects: Töpo-Suruga Old Japanese in the three provinces of Frellesvig's southern area, and Eastern Old Japanese in the rest. The former dialect lacks attested loanwords in Ainu languages. He remarks on the differences in the spelling of the two varieties. In earlier work, he had separated the dialects of Shinano province as Central Old Japanese due to the absence of innovations shared with his Töpo-Suruga and Eastern Old Japanese groups.

== Typology ==
Like the other Japonic languages, Eastern Old Japanese has a subject–object–verb word order with a structure that includes a modifier at the beginning of the sentence, although there are exceptions. There are many suffixes, but unlike most SOV languages, there are also prefixes. Morphologically, it is principally an agglutinative language, but portmanteaus also exist.

== Phonology ==
The phonotactic structure of Eastern Old Japanese is strictly (C)V, without consonant gemination nor long vowels. Typically, vowel sequences contract rather than merge. The accent system is unknown.

There exists a correspondence between the Western Old Japanese *i and *u and the Eastern Old Japanese *(j)e and *o respectively, which is confirmed by the comparison of the three Japanese dialects, as well as the Ryukyuan languages. Thus, the Eastern Old Japanese vowel system would have been closer to that of Proto-Japonic than that of Western Old Japanese.

== Vocabulary ==
The Eastern Old Japanese lexicon is mainly inherited from Japonic languages. However, it is also contains Koreanic and Ainu loanwords, and only a few of Sinitic origin.

Eastern Old Japanese vocabulary
English	Eastern Old Japanese
girl	kwo
mountain	yama
flower	pana
word	kötö
father	titi
mother	papa
person	pyitö
river	kapa
journey	ta[n]pyi
deity	kamyi
peak	ne
rope	pyimo

Other words are close to Japonic forms that appeared in later periods:

Comparison of Eastern Old Japanese and Japonic
English	Eastern Old Japanese	Western Old Japanese	Middle Japanese	Modern Japanese
rainbow	nwonsi		niji	niji
maple	kapyerute		kaferude	kaede
barley	munkyi			mugi
rudder	kati	kadi		kaji
willow	yanakyi			yanagi
horse	muma	uma	muma	uma
snow	yökyi	yukyi		yuki
eyebrow	maywo	mayu		mayu

== Extinction and descendants ==
The dialects of Eastern Old Japanese were replaced by the Kyoto dialect of Early Middle Japanese, the descendant of Western Old Japanese during the Heian period (between the 8th and the 12th centuries). However, there are still modern traces of this variety:

- The relic Hachijō language, spoken on the Izu Islands, but on the verge of extinction. Eastern Old Japanese and Hachijō have common characteristics not found in other branches of the Japonic family.
- Modern Eastern Japanese dialects contain traces of a substrate, such as the verb sugos- 'to exceed' (comparable to Western Old Japanese sugus-, of the same meaning), the imperative suffix -ro, the predicative suffix -ke on adjective verbs or -o on verbs, among others.

== Relationship with Ryukyuan ==
According to Maner Lawton Thorpe (1983), the phonological correspondences of Eastern Old Japanese shared with the Ryukyuan languages could be explained by descent from a common language. Thus, he proposes the following phylogenetic tree:

- Japanese-Ryukyuan languages
  - [Proto-]Kyūshū
    - Ryukyuan languages
    - Kyūshū Old Japanese (not attested)
    - Eastern Old Japanese
  - Western Old Japanese (from the Kansai Region)

Following his model, Western Old Japanese would have separated first, during the 4th and 5th centuries, then the Kyūshū branch would have separated three or four centuries later. Subsequently, Kantō would have been populated by Japonic speakers directly from Kyūshū, without passing through central Japan.

However, Alexander Koji Makiyama (2015) finds the results of diachronic changes in Eastern Old Japanese such as in denasalization, fortition and vowel raising unconvincing in comparison with the Ryukyuan languages. In fact, he finds:

- 12 attestations in Eastern Old Japanese of denasalization which could be attributed to Proto-Ryukyuan, but 10 of them actually correspond to the possessive case marker -ga;
- fortition is only attested in two forms in Eastern Old Japanese, compared to only one in Proto-Ryukyuan, *bakare, in addition to the fact that it may be a loan; (Note: Following an analysis of modern Ryukyuan dialects.)
- regarding vowel raising, the change from Proto-Japonic *ə to *o in Proto-Ryukyuan makes certain reconstruction impossible. Only four forms in Eastern Old Japanese could correspond to the Proto-Ryukyuan form.

The hypothesis of linguistic contact or resemblance is therefore, at the current state of knowledge, only speculative. Thomas Pellard (2015) also considers this hypothesis as unproven.
