= Proto-Japonic language =

Reconstructed ancestor of the Japonic languages

Proto-Japonic
- Proto-Japanese–Ryukyuan
- Reconstruction of: Japonic languages
- Region: Japanese archipelago
- Lower-order reconstructions: Old Japanese; Proto-Ryukyuan

Proto-Japonic, also known as Proto-Japanese or Proto-Japanese–Ryukyuan, is the reconstructed language ancestral to the Japonic language family. It has been reconstructed by using a combination of internal reconstruction from Old Japanese and by applying the comparative method to Old Japanese (both the central variety of the Nara area and Eastern Old Japanese dialects) and the Ryukyuan languages. The major reconstructions of the 20th century were produced by Samuel Elmo Martin and Shirō Hattori.

== Background ==
The Japonic language family comprises Japanese, spoken in the main islands of Japan; Hachijō, spoken on Hachijō-jima, Aogashima, and the Daitō Islands; and the Ryukyuan languages, spoken in the Ryukyu Islands. Most scholars believe that Japonic was brought to northern Kyushu from the Korean Peninsula around 700 to 300 BC by wet-rice farmers of the Yayoi culture and spread throughout the Japanese archipelago, replacing indigenous languages. The oldest attested form is Old Japanese, which was recorded using Chinese characters in the 7th and 8th centuries.

Ryukyuan varieties are considered dialects of Japanese in Japan but have little intelligibility with Japanese or even among one another. They are divided into northern and southern groups, corresponding to the physical division of the chain by the 250 km-wide Miyako Strait. The Shuri dialect of Okinawan is attested since the 16th century. All Ryukyuan varieties are in danger of extinction.

Since Old Japanese displays several innovations that are not shared with Ryukyuan, the two branches must have separated before the 7th century. The migration to the Ryukyus from southern Kyushu may have coincided with the rapid expansion of the agricultural Gusuku culture in the 10th and 11th centuries. After this migration, there was limited influence from mainland Japan until the conquest of the Ryukyu Kingdom by the Satsuma Domain in 1609.

Early reconstructions of the proto-language, culminating in the work of Samuel Martin, were based primarily on internal reconstruction from Old Japanese. Evidence from Japanese dialects and Ryukyuan languages was also used, especially regarding the history of the Japanese pitch accent, but otherwise assuming a secondary role. The complementary approach of comparative reconstruction from the dialects and Ryukyuan has grown in importance since the work of Shirō Hattori in the 1970s.

== Phonology ==
Proto-Japonic words are generally polysyllabic, with syllables having the form (C)V.

=== Consonants ===
The following Proto-Japonic consonant inventory is generally agreed upon, except for the values of *w and *j (see below):

Proto-Japonic consonants
	Bilabial	Alveolar	Palatal	Velar
Stop	*p	*t		*k
Nasal	*m	*n		
Fricative		*s		
Tap		*r		
Approximant	*w		*j	

Scholars agree that the Old Japanese voiced consonants b, d, z and g, which never occurred word-initially, are derived from clusters of nasals and voiceless consonants. In most cases, the two consonants were brought together by loss of an intervening vowel. A few words display no evidence for a former vowel, and scholars reconstruct a syllable-final nasal of indeterminate place preceding the voiceless obstruent, as in *tunpu > Old Japanese tubu > Modern Japanese tsubu 'grain', *pinsa > OJ piza > MJ hiza 'knee'. These nasals are unrelated to the moraic nasal of later forms of Japonic, which derive from contractions or borrowings from other languages such as Middle Chinese.

The other Old Japanese consonants are projected back to Proto-Japonic except that authors disagree on whether the sources of Old Japanese w and y should be reconstructed as glides *w and *j or as voiced stops *b and *d respectively, based on Ryukyuan reflexes:

- Southern Ryukyuan varieties have /b/ corresponding to Old Japanese w, e.g. Miyako ba 'I' and Yaeyama bata 'stomach' corresponding to Old Japanese wa and wata. Two dialects spoken around Toyama Bay on the west coast of Honshu also have /b/ corresponding to initial /w/ in other Japanese dialects.
- Yonaguni, at the far end of the Ryukyu island chain, has /d/ in words where Old Japanese has y, e.g. da 'house', du 'hot water' and dama 'mountain' corresponding to Old Japanese ya, yu and yama.

Some authors, including advocates of a genetic relationship with Korean and other northeast-Asian languages, argue that Southern Ryukyuan initial /b/ and Yonaguni /d/ are retentions of Proto-Japonic voiced stops *b and *d that became /w/ and /j/ elsewhere through a process of lenition. However, many linguists, especially in Japan, prefer the opposite hypothesis, namely that Southern Ryukyuan initial /b/ and Yonaguni /d/ are derived from local innovations in which Proto-Japonic *w and *j underwent fortition. The case for lenition of *d- > j- is substantially weaker, with the fortition hypothesis supported by Sino-Japonic words with Middle Chinese initials in *j also having reflexes of initial /d/ in Yonaguni, such as dasai 'vegetables' from Middle Chinese *jia-tsʰʌi (野菜). An entry in the late-15th-century Korean annals Seongjong Taewang Sillok records the local name of the island of Yonaguni in Idu script as 閏伊是麼, which has the Middle Korean reading zjuni sima, with sima glossed in the text as the Japonic word for 'island'. That is direct evidence of an intermediate stage of the fortition *j- > *z- > d-, leading to the modern name /dunaŋ/ 'Yonaguni'.

=== Vowels ===
Most authors accept six Proto-Japonic vowels, which are as follows:

Proto-Japonic vowels
	Front	Central	Back
Close	*i		*u
Mid	*e	*ə	*o
Open		*a	

The vowels *i, *u, *ə and *a have been obtained by internal reconstruction from Old Japanese, with the other Old Japanese vowels derived from vowel clusters. The mid vowels *e and *o are required to account for Ryukyuan correspondences. In Old Japanese, they were raised to i and u respectively except word-finally. They have also left some traces in Eastern Old Japanese dialects and are also found in some early mokkan and in some modern Japanese dialects.

Reflexes of Proto-Japonic vowels
Proto-Japonic	Proto-Ryukyuan	Old Japanese
*i	*i	i₁
*e	*e	i₁ (e₁)
*u	*u	u
*o	*o	u (o₁)
*ə	*o	o₂
*a	*a	a

The other vowels of Old Japanese are believed to derive from sequences of Proto-Japonic vowels, with different reflexes in Ryukyuan and Eastern Old Japanese:

Reflexes of Proto-Japonic vowel sequences
Proto-Japonic	Proto-Ryukyuan	Old Japanese	Eastern Old Japanese
*ui	*i	i₂	i
*əi	*e	i₂ (e₂)	i
*ai	*e	e₂	e
*iə	*e	e₁	e
*ia	*e	e₁	a
*au	*o	o₁	o₁
*ua	*o	o₁	o₁

In most cases, Proto-Japonic *əi corresponds to Old Japanese i₂. Proto-Japonic *əi is reconstructed for Old Japanese e₂ in the few cases that it alternates with o₂ (< *ə). Some authors propose a high central vowel *ɨ to account for these alternations, but there is no evidence for it in Ryukyuan or Eastern Old Japanese. The alternate reflex e₂ seems to be limited to specific monosyllabic nominal stems such as se~so₂ 'back', me₂~mo 'seaweed' and ye~yo₂ 'branch'.

=== Prosody ===
Principal mergers of mainland pitch-accent classes for disyllabic nouns 2.1 ~ 2.3 2.2 ~ 2.3 2.2 ~ 2.3, 2.4 ~ 2.5 2.1 ~ 2.2, 2.4 ~ 2.5 no distinction unclear

The Japanese pitch accent is usually not recorded in the Old Japanese script. The oldest description of the accent, in the 12th-century dictionary Ruiju Myōgishō, marked pitch using a variation on the notation for Middle Chinese tones. The usual interpretation, following Haruhiko Kindaichi, treats the markers, corresponding to the Middle Chinese dark level, light level, rising and departing tones, as low, falling, high and rising pitches respectively. The reconstruction of S. Robert Ramsey inverts these values. The pitch pattern of early loans to Ainu languages matches Kindaichi's interpretation.

Regardless of their values, the different tone patterns in the Ruiju Myōgishō group words into accent classes that generally correspond to those obtained by comparative reconstruction from modern mainland Japanese dialects. In contrast, Ryukyuan languages share a set of accent classes that cut across the mainland classes.

For example, for two-syllable nouns, the Ruiju Myōgishō has five accent classes, which are reflected in different ways in the major accent systems of mainland Japanese, here represented by Kyoto, Tokyo, Oita and Kagoshima. Ryukyuan languages, here represented by Kametsu (the prestige variety of the Tokunoshima language), show a three-way division, which partially cuts across the five mainland classes. In each of the modern varieties, the pattern of high and low pitches (in some cases falling or rising) is shown across both syllables and a following neutral particle.

Pitch accent classes for two-syllable nouns with following neutral particle
Ruiju Myōgishō			Ainu loans	Modern varieties					
Class	Kindaichi	Ramsey	Ainu loans	Kyoto	Tokyo	Oita	Kagoshima	Kametsu	
2.1	HH	LL	HH	HH-H	LH-H	LH-H	LH-L	LH-H	
2.2	HL	LH	HL	HL-L	LH-L	LH-H	LH-L	LH-H	
2.3	LL	HH	LL	HL-L	LH-L	LH-L	LL-H	(a); HL-L	(b); LH-L
2.4	LH	HL	LH	LL-H	HL-L	HL-L	LL-H	(a); HL-L	(b); LH-L
2.5	LF	HR	LH	LH-L	HL-L	HL-L	LL-H	(a); HL-L	(b); LH-L

Thus to account for the various reflexes, each of the classes 2.3, 2.4 and 2.5 must be split in two, yielding eight classes of disyllabic nouns. In some Ryukyuan dialects, including Shuri, subclass (a) is marked by a long vowel in the first syllable instead of a distinct pitch pattern, which led Hattori to suggest that the original distinction was one of vowel length.

== Lexicon ==
=== Pronouns ===
The first-person pronouns were *wa and *a, but they are distinguished in different ways in the daughter languages. The form *na, which may have been borrowed from Koreanic, yielded an ambivalent personal pronoun in Japanese, a second-person pronoun in Northern Ryukyuan, and a reflexive pronoun in Southern Ryukyuan. Proto-Ryukyuan had another second-person pronoun, *ʔe or *ʔo, attested throughout the islands.

The following interrogative pronouns can be reconstructed:

- *ta 'who'
- *n-anu- 'what'
- *entu- 'where' (possibly borrowed from Koreanic)
- *entu-re 'which'
- *etu 'when'
- *e-ka 'how'
- *e-ku 'how many'

The following demonstratives can be reconstructed:

- *kə 'this' (proximal)
- *ka 'that' (distal)

The Old Japanese demonstrative so_{2} < *sə indicated remoteness from the speaker, and became a mesial demonstrative in Early Middle Japanese. Its relationship with the Proto-Ryukyuan mesial demonstrative (*ʔo) is unclear. The latter corresponds to the Hachijō distal demonstrative u-.

=== Numerals ===
Reconstructed Proto-Japonic numerals (1-10) and their reflexes in selected descendants are as follows:

Japonic numerals
	Proto-Japonic	Mainland		Hachijo	Ryukyuan			Peninsular Japonic†
	Proto-Japonic	Old Japanese	Modern Japanese	Hachijo	Shuri (Okinawa)	Hatoma (Yaeyama)	Yonaguni	Peninsular Japonic†
1	*pitə	pi_{1}to_{2}	hito	çito-/te-	tii-	pusu-	t'u-	
2	*puta	puta	futa	ɸɯta-	taa-	huta-	t'a-	
3	*mi(t)-	mi_{1}	mi	mi-	mii-	mii-	mii-	*mit
4	*jə	yo_{2}	yo	jo-	juu-	juu-	duu-	
5	*itu	itu	itsu	it͡sɯ-	ici-	ici-	ici-	*yuci
6	*mu(t)-	mu	mu	mɯ-	muu-	muu-	muu-	
7	*nana	nana	nana	nana-	nana-	nana-	nana-	*nanən
8	*ja	ya	ya	ja-	jaa-	jaa-	daa-	
9	*kəkənə	ko_{2}ko_{2}no_{2}	kokono	kokono-	kukunu-	kunu-	kugunu-	
10	*təwə	to_{2}wo	tō	toː	tuu	tuu-	tuu	*tək

The Proto-Japonic forms for '2', '6' and '8' appear to be derived from the words for '1', '3' and '4' (of which they are doubles) by vowel alternation *i:*u and *ə:*a.
