= Hachijojima Airport =

Hachijojima Airport 八丈島空港
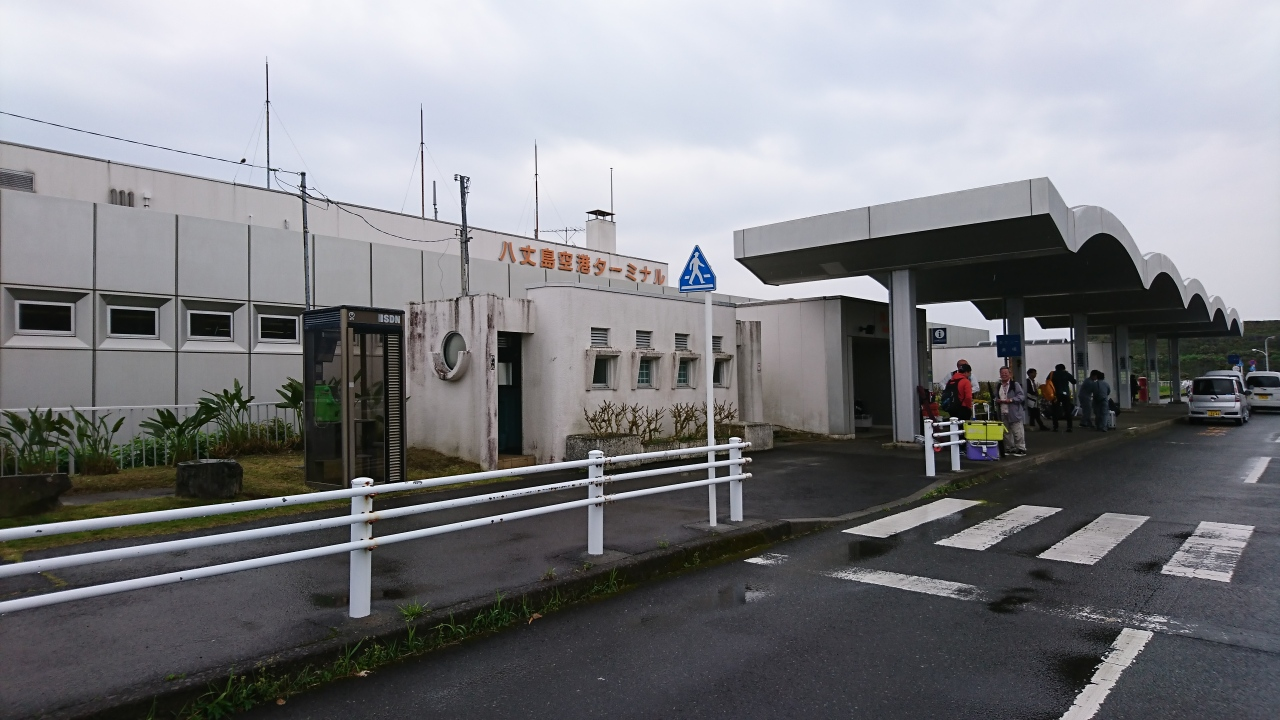
- IATA: HAC; ICAO: RJTH

Summary
- Airport type: Public
- Operator: Tokyo Municipal Government
- Serves: Hachijōjima, Japan
- Elevation AMSL: 301 ft / 92 m
- Coordinates: 33°06′54″N 139°47′09″E

Map
- Location in Japan

Runways
| Direction | Length | | Surface |
| Direction | m | ft | Surface |
|---|---|---|---|
| 08/26 | 2,000 | 6,562 | Asphalt |

Statistics (2015)
- Passengers: 180,257
- Cargo (metric tonnes): 1,074
- Aircraft movement: 3,872
- Source: Japanese AIP at AIS Japan; Japanese Ministry of Land, Infrastructure, Transport and Tourism

Hachijojima Airport (八丈島空港, Hachijōjima Kūkō) (IATA: HAC, ICAO: RJTH) is a regional airport serving Hachijōjima in the southern Izu Islands, Tokyo, Japan.

== History ==
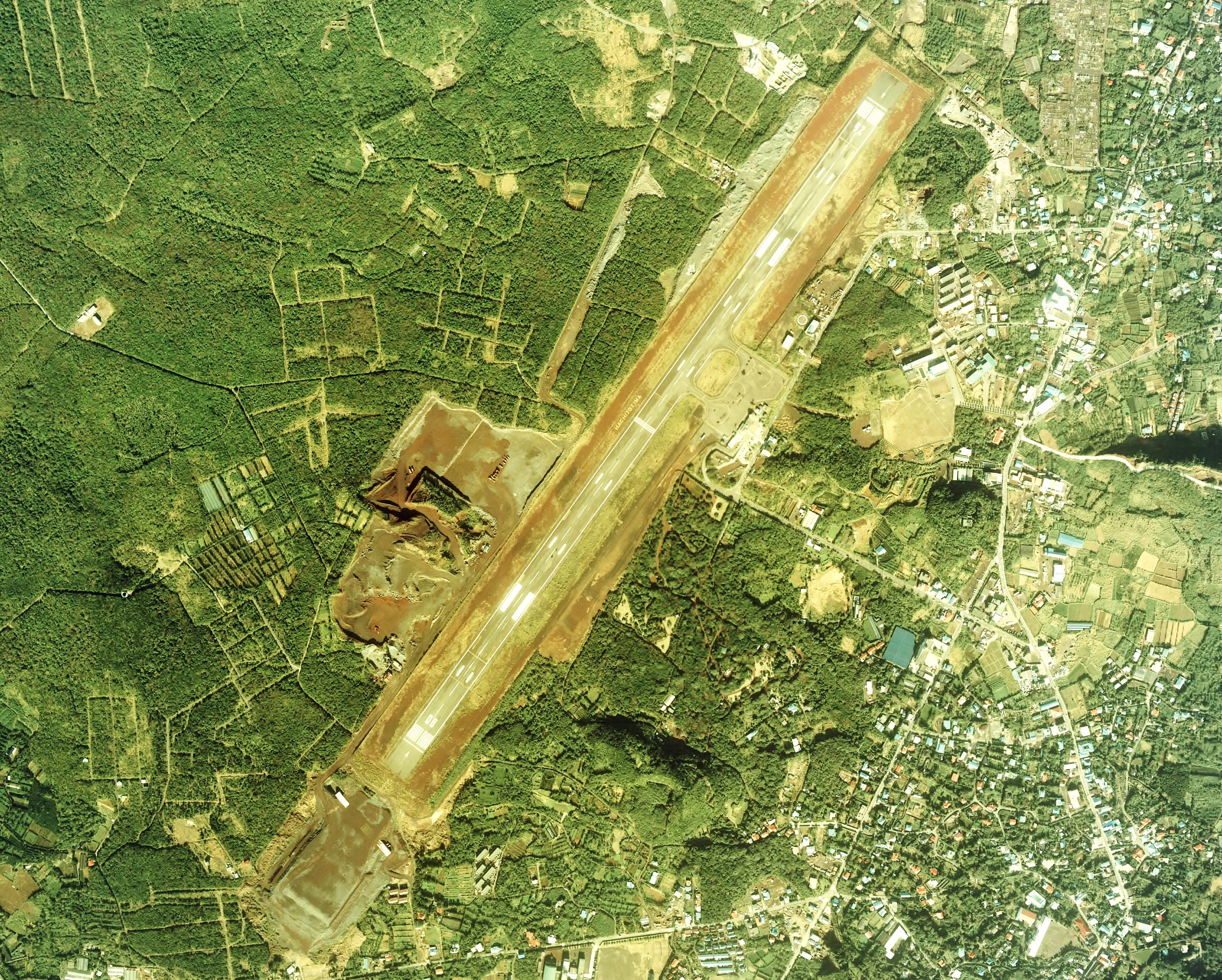
Aerial photograph of Hachijojima Airport from 1978

An air field was established on the island of Hachijōjima in 1926 by the Imperial Japanese Navy. In 1954, it was turned over to civilian control and managed by the local authorities on the island. Scheduled service between Hachijōjima and Haneda Airport in Tokyo by Fujita Airlines in 1955, and subsequently to Komaki Airport in Nagoya.

From 2000, ANA subsidiary Air Nippon operated flights to Hachijōjima using a Boeing 737-400 colorfully painted with a dolphin design to promote tourism. The campaign proved successful, and the aircraft used on the route was changed to a 737-500, and then to an Airbus A320. Flights to Oshima Airport were discontinued from 2009.

Toho Air Service operates helicopter services from Hachijōjima Airport to Aogashima and Mikurajima. Only All Nippon Airways's Boeing 737 or Airbus A320 provide service to Haneda Airport every day.

== Airlines and destinations ==
| Airlines | Destinations |
|---|---|
| All Nippon Airways | Tokyo–Haneda |
| Toho Air Service | Aogashima, Mikurajima |

== Accidents and incidents ==
- April 30, 1963: A DC-3-201E (JA5039) operated by All Nippon Airways crashed on landing. There were no fatalities or injuries, but the aircraft was damaged beyond repair.
- August 17, 1963: A Fujita Airlines DH-115 Heron (JA6159) crashed into Mt. Hachijo-Fuji shortly after takeoff, killing all 19 passengers and crew on board. Following the accident, Fujita Airlines was merged into All Nippon Airways.
