= Hachijō Subprefecture =

Subprefecture of Tokyo

Coordinates: 33°06′36″N 139°47′21″E

Hachijō Subprefecture 八丈支庁
- Hachijō-shichō
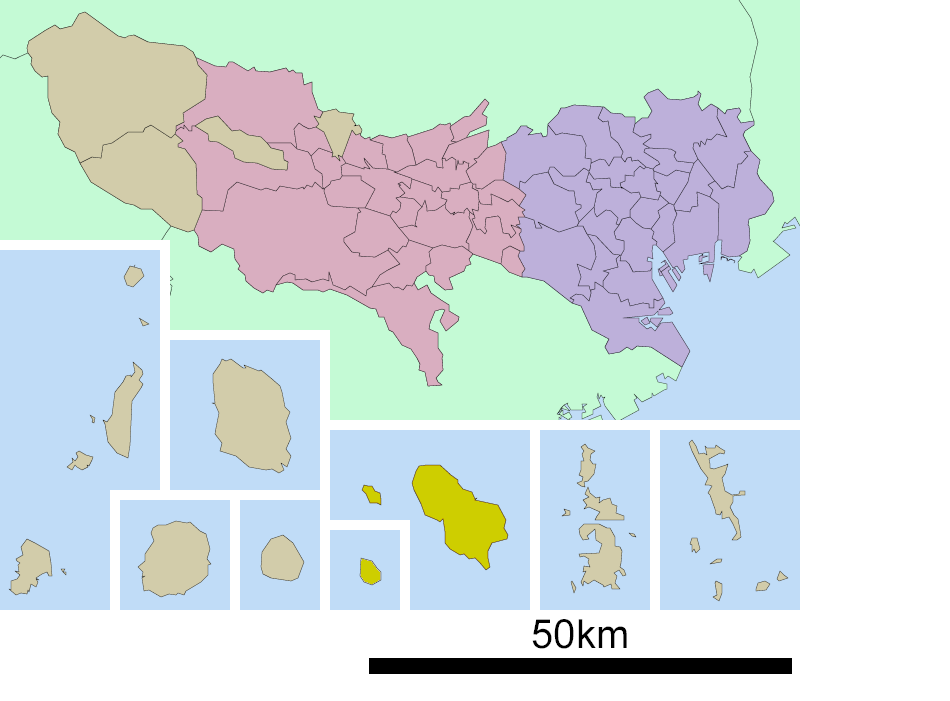
- Location of Hachijō Subprefecture in the Tokyo Metropolis
- Prefecture: Tokyo Metropolis
- Capital: Hachijō

Area
  - Total: 78.6 km^{2} (30.3 sq mi)

Population (October 1, 2023)
  - Total: 8,790
  - Density: 112/km^{2} (290/sq mi)
- Website: Official website

Hachijō Subprefecture (八丈支庁, Hachijō-shichō) is a subprefecture of Tokyo Metropolis, Japan. The organization of government belongs to the Tokyo Metropolitan Government Bureau Of General Affairs.

== Geography ==
The subprefecture has an area of 78.6 square km. It is located within the Izu Islands and is 200km away from Mainland Japan.

=== Municipalities ===
Romanji	Kanji	Area (Km²)	Population	Type	Island(s)	Map
Hachijō	八丈町	72.24	7,056	Town	Hachijō-jima and Hachijō-kojima	
Aogashima	青ヶ島村	5.96	169	Village	Aogashima	55p

=== Other Islands ===
Additionally, Hachijō includes the four southernmost Izu Islands, which are uninhabited. These islands currently do not belong to any municipality; both Hachijō and Aogashima claim administrative rights. From north to south, the islands are:

- Bayonnaise Rocks (Beyonēzu Retsugan)
- Smith Island (Sumisu-tō)
- Tori-shima
- Lot's Wife (Sōfu-iwa)

Among the islands of the subprefecture, only Hachijōjima and Aogashima are inhabited.

== Demographics ==
In 2023, Hachijō Subprefecture had a population of 8,790. The village of Aogashima is the least populated municipality in all of Japan, with only 169 residents

=== Language ===
The Hachijō language, also called Shima Kotoba, is spoken exclusively on the two main islands. It is an endangered language, with 0 native speakers being children or young adults.
