= Fujita Airlines =

Japanese airline

- Founded: 1956
- Ceased operations: 1963 (merged with All Nippon Airways)
- Fleet size: Cessna 170, de Havilland Dove, de Havilland Heron, Fokker F27, Convair 240

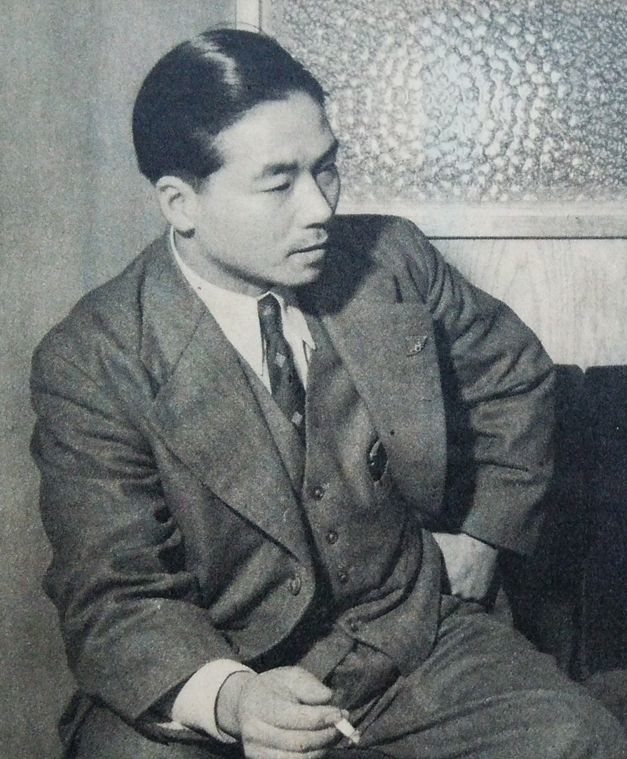
Company founder, Aoki Haruo

Fujita Airlines (藤田航空, Fujita Kōkū) was an airline in Japan, formerly known as Nippon Yuran Airlines. Founded in 1956, it operated various types of propeller aircraft, including the Cessna 170, de Havilland Dove and Fokker F27. In 1963, the company merged with All Nippon Airways.

== Incidents and accidents ==
- On August 17, 1963, a Fujita Airlines de Havilland Heron 1B (registration JA6155) struck a mountain near Hachijo Island shortly after takeoff due to possible engine failure, killing all 19 passengers and crew on board.
