= Aogashima, Tokyo =

Aogashima 青ヶ島村
- Village
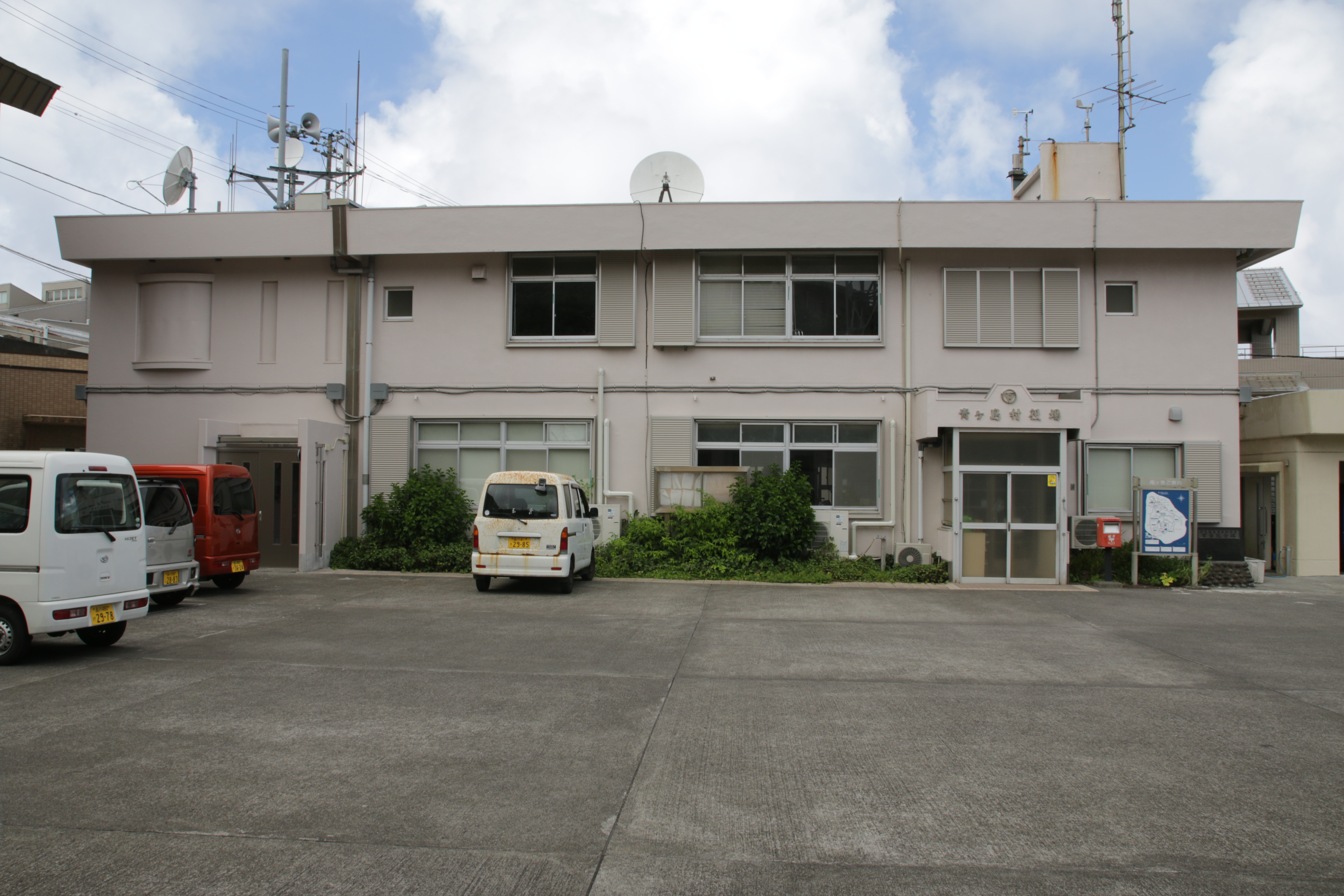
- Aogashima Village Hall

- Flag Seal

- Location of Aogashima in Tokyo Metropolis

- Coordinates: 32°27′58.9″N 139°45′48.1″E
- Country: Japan
- Region: Kantō
- Prefecture: Tokyo Metropolis

Area
  - Total: 5.96 km^{2} (2.30 sq mi)

Population (Oct 2018)
  - Total: 169
  - Density: 28.2/km^{2} (73/sq mi)
- Time zone: UTC+9 (Japan Standard Time)
- Tree: Persea
- Flower: Lilium
- Bird: Japanese wood pigeon
- Phone number: 04996-9-0111
- Address: Mubanchi 100-1701, Aogashima-mura, Tokyo
- Website: www.vill.aogashima.tokyo.jp

Aogashima (青ヶ島村, Aogashima-mura) is a village located in Hachijō Subprefecture, Tokyo Metropolis, Japan. It is the least-populated municipality in Japan, with an estimated population of 169 and a population density of 28.2 persons per km^{2} as of 2018. Its total area is 5.96 square kilometres (2.30 sq mi).

== Geography ==
Aogashima village covers the island of Aogashima, the southernmost and most isolated populated island in the Izu archipelago in the Philippine Sea, 358.4 kilometres (222.7 mi) south of central Tokyo, and 71.4 kilometres (44.4 mi) south of Hachijō-jima, its nearest populated neighbor. Warmed by the Kuroshio Current, the town has a warmer and wetter climate than central Tokyo.

=== Neighboring municipalities ===
- Tokyo Metropolis
  - Hachijō, Tokyo
  - Ogasawara, Tokyo

== History ==
It is uncertain when human settlement first began on Aogashima, but the island was known to be inhabited in the early Edo period, and is mentioned in historical records kept by the Tokugawa shogunate in Hachijōjima. During a major volcanic eruption in 1785, a large number of islanders perished, and the remainder were evacuated to Hachijōjima. An 1835 census reported 241 inhabitants (133 men, 108 women), mostly engaged in fishing.

On April 1, 1940, the island came under the administrative jurisdiction of Hachijō Subprefecture. The population is centered on two hamlets; Yasundogō (休戸郷) in the east and Nishigō (西郷) in the west.

== Demographics ==
Around 100 of the approximately 170 villagers are natives of the island. The non-native population largely consists of public sector employees, such as school staff and police, many of whom are temporarily transferred to the island.

The average age of the population was 44.5 as of 2020. Older residents are often forced to leave the island due to its lack of hospital or elder care facilities.

As of 2018, the government forecast that the village population will fall to 104 by 2045.

Historical population
Year	Pop.	±%
1970	234	—
1980	192	−17.9%
1990	203	+5.7%
2000	203	+0.0%
2010	201	−1.0%
2020	169	−15.9%

== Economy ==
The public sector is the largest industry in Aogashima, with two local construction companies. The island is famous for its shochu and salt production.

== Government ==
The village government employs 28 people and has an annual budget of JPY 1.04 billion, 35.5% of which is directly subsidized by the Tokyo Metropolitan Government. Local taxes cover only 4.1% of the government's budget.

The village mayor resigned in December 2018 following a scandal involving improper contracting and disbursements, but was re-elected without a vote in January 2019. A vice-mayor post was created in April 2019 to improve village governance.

== Transportation ==
Due to its lack of natural harbors and strong currents, Aogashima has always been difficult to access. The wharf at the island's only port can handle small ships of up to 500 tons, and is unusable during times of high waves and inclement weather.

Toho Air Service provides daily helicopter service to the island from Hachijōjima Airport, a 20-minute flight which is limited to 9 passengers and is regularly booked a month in advance. There is also scheduled ferry service from Hachijōjima four or five days a week, which takes around two and a half hours, but is often subject to cancellation due to high waves at the port.

== Education ==
Because Aogashima has a small population, there is one school that is available to elementary and junior high school students. Aogashima Elementary-Junior High School (青ヶ島村立青ヶ島小中学校) serves student populations. As of March 2022, the school had 11 elementary students, 3 junior high students, and 24 faculty and staff, making it one of the largest employers in the village. The school briefly had no junior high students in the spring of 2022, but 3 students were brought from outside the island to keep the junior high program active.

== Gallery ==
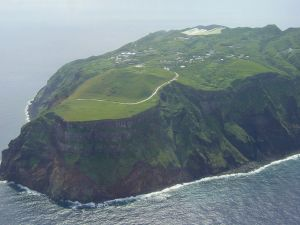
Aerial view of the island

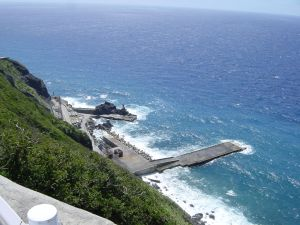
Port of Sanpō, the only port in the island
