= Proto-Ryukyuan language =

Reconstructed language

Proto-Ryukyuan
- Reconstruction of: Ryukyuan languages
- Region: Japan, possibly in Kyushu or Tokara islands
- Reconstructed ancestor: Proto-Japonic
- Lower-order reconstructions: Proto-Amami-Okinawa/Proto-Northern-Ryukyuan; Proto-Sakishima

Proto-Ryukyuan is the reconstructed ancestor of the Ryukyuan languages, probably associated with the Gusuku culture in the early second millennium AD.

== Background ==
The modern Ryukyuan languages are spoken on the Ryukyu Islands, from the Amami Islands to Yonaguni. All Ryukyuan varieties are endangered; many speakers are aged late sixties or older, while younger speakers are only monolingual in Japanese.

== Classification ==
Pellard (2009:249-275) gives a list of innovations in Japanese and Ryukyuan, with some redocumented by Pellard (2015:15). For instance, in Ryukyuan, the general word for 'body' is *do C, and has been grammaticalized into a reflexive pronoun. The Ryukyuan languages also exhibit a semantic shift 'intestines' > 'belly' of PJ *wata B. However, Japanese also has some innovations not in Ryukyuan, such as the word otoko 'man' < 'young boy', kami 'hair' < 'top'. (Note: According to Martin, 'hair' and 'top' belong to different accentual registers, classes 2.3 (LL) and 2.4 (LH) respectively.)

=== "Kyushu-Ryukyuan" hypothesis ===
There are some innovations shared with Ryukyuan and Kyushu dialects that have not been found in other mainland Japanese dialects. For instance, Yōsuke Igarashi (2018) claims that an innovation of Kyushu-Ryukyuan is to change kami-nidan verbs (-i(2)-) to shimo-nidan verbs (-e(2)-), a grammatical change of -kara from an ablative marker to a locative marker, and some vocabulary items (usually species) only found in such dialects. However, Pellard (2021) attempts refutes the hypothesis, citing typological and cross-linguistic reasons.

== Phonology ==
=== Consonants ===
The following consonants can be reconstructed for Proto-Ryukyuan:

| | | Bilabial | Alveolar | Dorsal |
|---|---|---|---|---|
| Nasal | | *m | *n | |
| Plosive | voiceless | *p | *t | *k |
| Plosive | voiced | *b | *d | |
| Fricative | voiceless | | *s | |
| Fricative | voiced | | *z | |
| Liquid | | *w | *ɾ | *j |

- Proto-Japonic *-p- generally lenites to *-w-, as in PJ *kapa 'river' > PR *kawa 'well' It is irregularly preserved in some words, mostly adjectives, which lead Thorpe to suggest a geminate consonant blocking lenition. However, nouns that don't sound emphatic also receive this irregular conservatism.
- Approximants in proto-Japonic preceding a high vowel are merged to a zero consonant in proto-Ryukyuan, such as PJ *upai 'above' > *uwe > PR *ue.
- No Ryukyuan languages preserve the yotsugana distinction; in this case, it means that older *di ~ *zi and *du ~ *zu merge as *zi and *zu.
  - One possible exception is that a special word for 'to take off (clothes)' exists in very few Miyakoan language (< *padok-): e.g. Hirara /padukɿ/. (Note: Originally written in the notation as パドゥキゥ [padukï]. However, even in Hirayama's notation of the Miyako vowels, it is actually supposed to be written as padukˢï.) The regular conventions of proto-Ryukyuan would require an irregular change in the consonant *zu- > *do-.
- In various foreign transcriptions of Old Okinawan, some words exhibit pre-nasalized obstruents, and some dialects also have nasalization before voiced consonants, suggesting that Proto-Ryukyuan had pre-nasalized obstruents.

=== Vowels ===
The following vowels can be reconstructed for Proto-Ryukyuan:

| | Front | Central | Back |
|---|---|---|---|
| Close | *i | | *u |
| Mid | *e | | *o |
| Open | | *a | |

All Ryukyuan languages have raised the mid-vowels *e and *o, but not all have merged these sounds with *i and *u. It is even possible the mid-vowels were already raised in Proto-Ryukyuan, but still distinct from the original high vowels. The dialects go through different developments depending on the preceding consonant. In various Northern Ryukyuan languages, *i will often palatalize the preceding consonant. To give an example, Shuri ʔitɕi 'pond' < PR *ike, but Shuri ʔiku- 'how many?' < PR *eku.

Some Old Okinawan texts can preserve the distinction of Proto-Ryukyuan mid-vowels. For instance, the Old Okinawan anthology Omoro Sōshi records the word for 'snow, hail' (Note: In Ryukyuan languages, it generally refers to hail.) as yoki 15 times, while yuki is only recorded once. This may suggest that the proto-form of such word had a mid-vowel *o.

Reflexes of PR *i, *e, *u, and *o
| Proto-Ryukyuan | Amami (Koniya) | Okinawa (Nakijin-Yonamine) | Miyako (Ōgami) | Yaeyama (Ishigaki-Shika) | Yonaguni |
|---|---|---|---|---|---|
| *i | ʔi, N | ˀi, ʲi, N | ɿ, (Note: This is a special vowel in Miyako, variously described as apical, laminal, or fricative vowel.) ɯ, s, N, ∅ | ɿ, N, ∅ | i, N, ∅ |
| *e | ʰɨ, i | ʰi, i | i | i | i |
| *u | ˀu, N | u, N | u, N, ∅ | u, N, ∅ | u, N, ∅ |
| *o | ʰu | u | u | u | u |

Examples of PR *i, *e, *u, and *o
| Gloss | Proto-Ryukyuan (Note: It is actually Proto-Japonic forms given, but there should be little to no noticeable sound changes from Proto-Japonic to Proto-Ryukyuan in these words.) | Amami (Koniya) (Note: Forms for 'horse' and 'sea' are cited according to Uchima and Arakaki (2000:371). The original IPA spelling in the source for 'horse' in Koniya was [ʔmaː].) | Okinawa (Nakijin-Yonamine) | Miyako (Ōgami) (Note: Forms for 'horse' and 'sea' are cited according to Pellard (2009:70, 304).) | Yaeyama (Ishigaki-Shika) | Yonaguni |
|---|---|---|---|---|---|---|
| daytime | *piru | çiɾ | pˀiɾuː | psː-ma | pɿːɾɿ | tsˀuː |
| garlic | *peru | ɸɨɾ | pʰiɾuː | piɯ | piŋ | çiɾu |
| horse | *uma | mˀaː | mˀaː | mmɑ | mma | mma |
| sea (Note: The word had undergone an irregular fronting of the first vowel in Sakishima dialects.) | *omi | ʔumi | ʔumi | im | iŋ ~ umɿ | iŋ ~ unnaga |
| mortar | *{u|o}su | ʔusɨ | ʔuɕi | us | usɿ | utɕi |
| medicine | *kusori | kusuɾ | kʰusui | ffuɯ | ɸuɕiɾɿ | tsˀuɾi |

Proto-Ryukyuan merged the Proto-Japonic diphthong *əi > *e, as in PJ *kəi 'tree' > PR *ke 'id.', PJ *əkəi- 'to get up' > PR *oke- 'id.'

=== Prosody ===
Proto-Ryukyuan has at least three reconstructed tone classes, classified as class A, B, and C respectively. Class A regularly corresponds to the initial high register in Middle Japanese.

The correspondences of class B and C are somewhat complex. While both can regularly correspond to the initial low register in Middle Japanese, there exists a split that exists for the following low register accent classes in Middle Japanese: (Note: The initial number denotes the number of morae in a noun. The number following the period is the accent class.) class 2.3, 2.4, 2.5, 3.4, and 3.5. Accent classes 3.6 and 3.7 almost always correspond to class C in Ryukyuan.

Most dialects often have a penultimate tone on a class C noun, such as the Kametsu dialect in Toku-no-Shima, the Nakijin-Yonamine dialect of Nakijin, and the Tarama-Nakasuji dialect of Miyako (in carrier phrases only). On the other hand, some dialects, such as the Asama dialect in Toku-no-Shima, and the Shuri dialect in Okinawa, exhibit long vowels of the penultimate syllable; for Shuri, it is only exhibited in disyllables.

There has been no unproblematic explanation for why there has been a split in classes B and C in Proto-Ryukyuan for the aforementioned accent classes, so this split has been typically projected back to Proto-Japonic. The Kishima dialect of Saga has been reported to have a tonal split in class 2.5 nouns that correspond to the Ryukyuan tone class split.

== Grammar ==
=== Verbs ===
Many Ryukyuan dialects have a conclusive and adnominal form that do not correspond straightforwardly to the Japanese ones. They are often palatalized, and such cases have been viewed to be derived from an infinitive *-i + *wor- 'to be; to stay'. Various scholars attempt to propose a common origin for this and the Japanese form -u, but it is problematic.

Basic forms of *kak- 'to write' in Northern Ryukyuan (Note: In Yamatohama, Nakijin-Yonamine, and Kudaka, the "conclusive" is actually used as an adnominal, while the "adnominal" is only used in kakari musubi constructions.)
| Form | Old Japanese | Amami-Yamatohama | Yoron-Higashiku | Nakijin-Yonamine | Shuri | Kudaka |
|---|---|---|---|---|---|---|
| Negative | kakanu | kʰakaɴ | kakannu | hakaɴ | kakaɴ | hakaɴ |
| Infinitive | kaki1 | kʰaki | kakki | hatɕi- | katɕi | haki- |
| Conclusive | kaku | kʰakuɴ | kakuɴ | hatɕuɴ | katɕuɴ | hakiɴ |
| Adnominal | kaku | kʰakuɾu | kakjuɾu | hatɕuːɾu | katɕuɾu | hakiɾu |
| Provisional | kake2ba | kʰakɨba | kakiba | hakiːba | kakiwa [sic] (Note: The actual conditional should be -eː, according to Kokuritsu Kokugo Kenkyūjo (1963:62).) | hakiba |
| Imperative | kake1 | kʰakɨ | kaki | kaki | haki | haki |

In some constructions in Northern Ryukyuan languages, the word tends to use a different adnominal form, which can be compared to the Eastern Old Japanese and Hachijō adnominal -o, implying such could be reconstructed at the Proto-Japonic level.

Nakijin-Yonamine adnominal forms
| Gloss | adnominal | old adnominal *-o | cf. other words with *u |
|---|---|---|---|
| 'stand' | tʰatɕuːnu | tʰatu (†tʰatɕi) | 'summer' nàtɕíː < *natu |
| 'beat' | kʰuɾuːɕunu | kʰuɾuːɕu (†kʰuɾuːɕi) | 'mortar' ʔúɕì < *{u|o}su |

The origins of the Southern Ryukyuan forms are more difficult to establish.

=== Adjectives ===
As with verbs, Ryukyuan adjectival forms are not cognate with the Japanese ones; they are derived from either the nominalizer *-sa ro *-ku + the auxiliary *-ar- 'to be'.

== Vocabulary ==
Thorpe (1983) reconstructs the following pronouns in Proto-Ryukyuan. For the first person, the singular and plural are assumed based on the Yonaguni reflex.

- *a, 'I' (singular)
- *wa 'we' (plural)
- *u, *e 'you' (singular)
- *uja, *ura 'you' (plural)

Ryukyuan numerals (Note: Most of these numerals are suffixed with *-tu, the numeral suffix in Ryukyuan languages.)
| | Proto-Ryukyuan | Amami (Yamatohama) | Okinawa (Shuri) | Yaeyama (Ishigaki) | Miyako (Hirara) | Yonaguni |
|---|---|---|---|---|---|---|
| 1 | *pito- | tïː- | tiː- | pˢɨti- | pitiː- | tˀu- |
| 2 | *puta- | taː- | taː- | futaː- | fu̥ta- | tˀa- |
| 3 | *mi- | miː- | miː- | miː- | miː- | miː- |
| 4 | *jo- | juː- | juː- | juː- | juː- | duː- |
| 5 | *{i,e}tu- | ʔitsɨ- | ici- | itsɨ- | itsɨ- | itɕi- |
| 6 | *mu- | muː- | muː- | muː- | m̩ː- | muː- |
| 7 | *nana- | nana- | nana- | nana- | nana- | nana- |
| 8 | *ja- | jaː- | jaa- | jaː- | jaa- | daː- |
| 9 | *kokono- | kʰuhunu- | kukunu- | kukunu- | kukunu- | kuɡunu- |
| 10 | *too | tuː | tuː | tuː | tuː | tuː |

Pellard (2015) reconstructs the following cultural vocabulary words for Proto-Ryukyuan:

- *kome B 'rice'
- *mai A 'rice'
- *ine B 'rice plant'
- *momi A 'unhulled rice'
- *mogi B 'wheat'
- *awa B 'foxtail millet'
- *kimi B 'broomcorn millet'
- *umo B 'taro, yam'
- *patake C 'field'
- *ta B 'rice paddy'
- *usi A 'cow'
- *uwa C 'pig'
- *uma B 'horse'
- *tubo A 'pot'
- *kame C 'jar'
- *pune C 'boat'
- *po A 'sail'
- *ijako B 'paddle'

== Bibliography ==
- Celik, Kenan (2024). "UniCog: A Framework Proposal for the Dynamic Compilation of Comparative Data for the Reconstruction of proto-Ryukyuan". NINJAL Research Papers (in Japanese). 26. doi:10.15084/0002000156.
- Hattori, Shirō (2018). 日本祖語の再建 [Reconstruction of Proto-Japanese] (in Japanese). Tokyo: Iwanami Shoten. ISBN 9784000612685.
- Hirayama, Teruo (1986). 琉球奄美方言の基礎語彙の総合的研究 [A Study of the Basic Vocabulary of the Amami Dialects in Ryukyuan] (in Japanese). Tokyo: Kadokawa. ISBN 4-04-022200-8.
- Hirayama, Teruo (1992–1994). 現代日本語方言大辞典 [Dictionary of Japanese Dialects] (in Japanese). Tokyo: Meiji Shoin.
- Igarashi, Yōsuke (2018). "分岐学的手法に基づいた日本語・琉球語諸方言の系統分類の試み" [An attempt at the systematic classification of Japanese and Ryukyuan Languages using cladistic methods]. フィールドと文献から見る日琉諸語の系統と歴史.
- Igarashi, Yōsuke (2021). "Reconstruction of Ryukyuan tone classes of Middle Japanese Class 2.4 and 2.5 nouns". Open Linguistics. 8 (1). De Gruyter: 232–257. doi:10.1515/opli-2022-0193.
- Igarashi, Yōsuke (2022). "琉球語・八丈語以外の非中央語系ジャポニック諸語の系統" [Classification of non-central Japanese Languages]. 言語系統樹ワークショップ.
- Jarosz, Aleksandra (2015). Nikolay Nevskiy’s Miyakoan dictionary: reconstruction from the manuscript and its ethnolinguistic analysis. Faculty of Modern Languages and Literature, Chair of Oriental Studies (Thesis). Poznan.
- Izuyama, Atsuko (2012). "Yonaguni". In Tranter, Nicolas (ed.). The Languages of Japan and Korea. Routledge. pp. 412–457. ISBN 978-0-415-46287-7.
- Lawrence, Wayne P. (2012). "Southern Ryukyuan". In Tranter, Nicolas (ed.). The Languages of Japan and Korea. Routledge. pp. 381–411. ISBN 978-0-415-46287-7.
- Martin, Samuel E. (1987). The Japanese Language Through Time. New Haven: Yale University Press. ISBN 0-300-0372-95.
- Miyagi, Shin'yū (2003). 石垣方言辞典 [Ishigaki Dialect Dictionary] (in Japanese). Naha: Okinawa Times. ISBN 4-87127-163-3.
- NINJAL (2001). 沖縄語辞典 [Okinawan Dictionary] (in Japanese). Zaimushō Insatsu-kyoku.
- Osada Suma 長田須磨; Suyama Nahoko 須山名保子; Fujii Misako 藤井美佐子, eds. (1980). Amami hōgen bunrui jiten gekan 奄美方言分類辞典 下巻 [Amami Dialect Thematic Dictionary Part B] (in Japanese). Kasama Shoin 笠間書院.
- Pellard, Thomas (2008). "Proto-Japonic *e and *o in Eastern Old Japanese". Cahiers de Linguistique Asie Orientale. 37 (2): 133–158. doi:10.1163/1960602808X00055.
- Pellard, Thomas (2013). "Ryukyuan perspectives on the proto-Japonic vowel system". Japanese/Korean Linguistics. 20. CSLI Publications: 81–96.
- Pellard, Thomas. 2015. The Linguistic archeology of the Ryukyu Islands. In Heinrich, Patrick and Miyara, Shinsho and Shimoji, Michinori (eds.), Handbook of the Ryukyuan Languages: History, Structure, and Use, 13–37. Berlin: DeGruyter Mouton.
- Pellard, Thomas (2024). "Ryukyuan and the reconstruction of proto-Japanese-Ryukyuan". In Frellesvig, Bjarke; Kinsui, Satoshi (eds.). Handbook of Japanese Historical Linguistics. Berlin: De Gruyter Mouton. pp. 39–68. ISBN 978-1-61451-285-1.
- Shimoji, Michinori (2012). "Northern Ryukyuan". In Tranter, Nicolas (ed.). The Languages of Japan and Korea. Routledge. pp. 351–380. ISBN 978-0-415-46287-7.
- Thorpe, Maner Lawton (1983). Ryūkyūan Language History (doctoral dissertation) (Thesis). Los Angeles: University of Southern California. doi:10.25549/usctheses-c3-505374.
- Vovin, Alexander (2012-08-07). "琉球祖語の語中における有声子音の再建について [On the reconstruction of the Proto-Ryukyuan voiced consonants]". National Institute for Japanese Language and Linguistics (in Japanese).
- Vovin, Alexander (2024). "Reconstruction of Japonic and para-Japonic based on external sources". In Frellesvig, Bjarke; Kinsui, Satoshi (eds.). Handbook of Japanese Historical Linguistics. Berlin: De Gruyter Mouton. pp. 11–37. ISBN 978-1-61451-285-1.
