= Hachijō, Tokyo =

Hachijō 八丈町
- Town
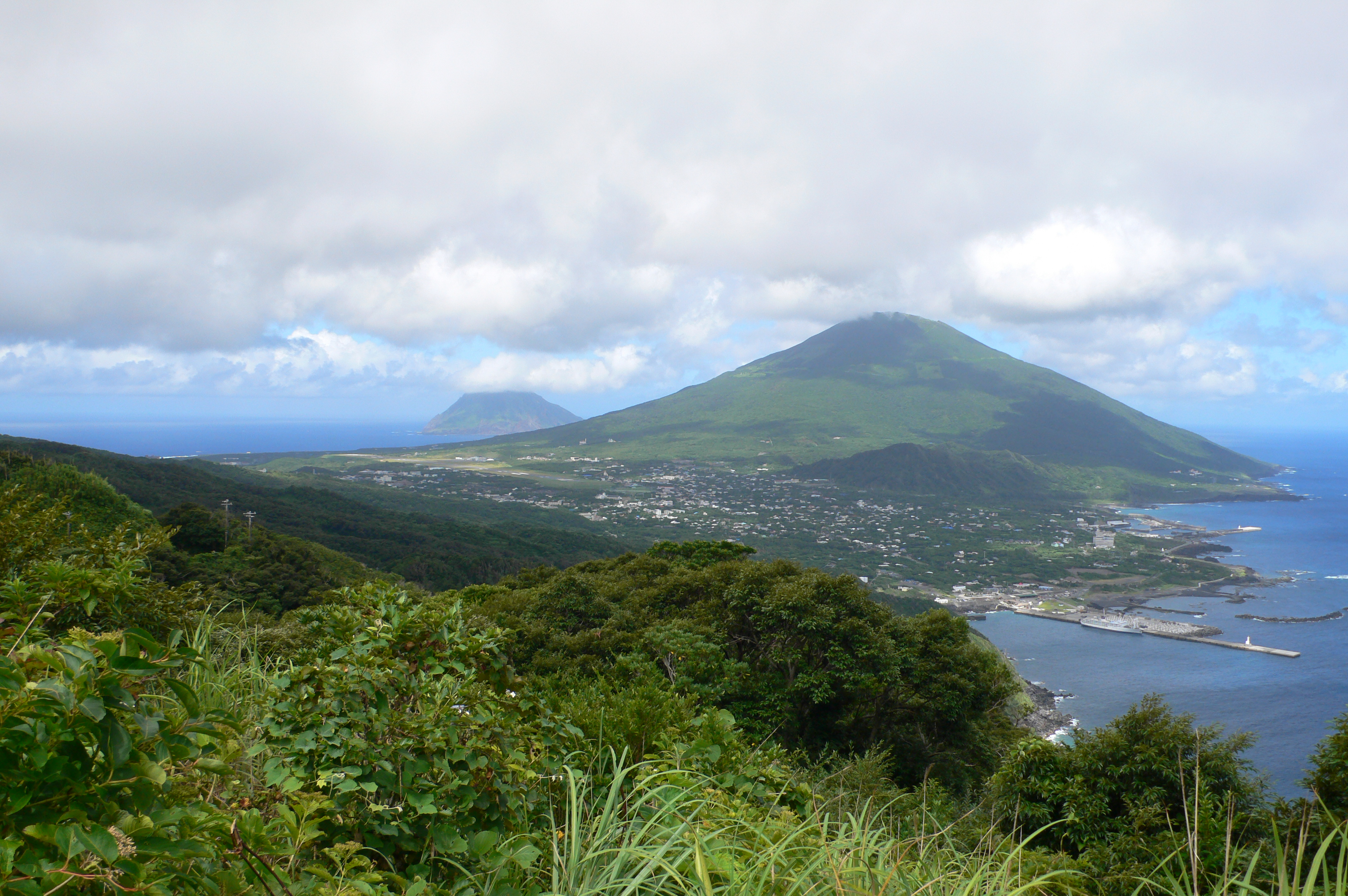
- Hachijōjima as viewed from Noboryu peak

- Flag Seal

- Location of Hachijō in Tokyo Metropolis

- Coordinates: 33°06′34.2″N 139°47′27.2″E
- Country: Japan
- Region: Kantō
- Prefecture: Tokyo Metropolis
- First official recorded: 1156 AD
- Town settled: April 1, 1955

Government
  - Mayor: Tomonari Yamashita (from November 2011)

Area
  - Total: 72.24 km^{2} (27.89 sq mi)

Population (December 2022)
  - Total: 7,056
  - Density: 97.7/km^{2} (253/sq mi)
- Time zone: UTC+9 (Japan Standard Time)
- Phone number: 04996-2-1121
- Address: 2551-2, Ōkagō, Hachijō-machi, Tōkyō-to 100-1498
- Climate: Cfa
- Website: www.town.hachijo.tokyo.jp
- Symbols
- Bird: Izu thrush
- Fish: Flying fish
- Flower: Strelitzia
- Tree: Pygmy date palm

Hachijō (八丈町, Hachijō-machi) is a town located in Hachijō Subprefecture, Tokyo Metropolis, Japan. As of 1 December 2022, the town had an estimated population of 7,056, and a population density of 97.7 persons per km^{2}. Its total area is 72.24 square kilometres (27.89 sq mi). Electric power for the town is provided by a geothermal power station and a wind farm.

== Geography ==
Hachijō covers the islands of Hachijō-jima and Hachijō-kojima, two of the islands in the Izu archipelago in the Philippine Sea, 228 kilometres (142 mi) south of central Tokyo. Warmed by the Kuroshio Current, the town has a warmer and wetter climate than central Tokyo. All of the town's residents live on the island of Hachijō-jima, as the last of Hachijō-kojima residents left in 1969, citing lack of basic public services on that island.

=== Neighboring municipalities ===
- Tokyo Metropolis
  - Aogashima, Tokyo
  - Mikurajima, Tokyo

=== Climate ===
Climate data for Hachijō-jima (1991−2020 normals, extremes 1906−present)
Month	Jan	Feb	Mar	Apr	May	Jun	Jul	Aug	Sep	Oct	Nov	Dec	Year
Record high °C (°F)	21.5 (70.7)	21.9 (71.4)	22.7 (72.9)	26.3 (79.3)	27.4 (81.3)	30.4 (86.7)	35.5 (95.9)	34.8 (94.6)	33.2 (91.8)	31.0 (87.8)	26.4 (79.5)	24.6 (76.3)	35.5 (95.9)
Mean daily maximum °C (°F)	12.9 (55.2)	13.5 (56.3)	15.8 (60.4)	18.9 (66.0)	21.8 (71.2)	24.1 (75.4)	27.7 (81.9)	29.6 (85.3)	27.6 (81.7)	23.8 (74.8)	20.0 (68.0)	15.6 (60.1)	20.9 (69.6)
Daily mean °C (°F)	10.1 (50.2)	10.4 (50.7)	12.5 (54.5)	15.8 (60.4)	18.8 (65.8)	21.3 (70.3)	25.2 (77.4)	26.5 (79.7)	24.5 (76.1)	21.0 (69.8)	16.9 (62.4)	12.7 (54.9)	18.0 (64.4)
Mean daily minimum °C (°F)	7.6 (45.7)	7.5 (45.5)	9.3 (48.7)	12.9 (55.2)	16.2 (61.2)	19.4 (66.9)	23.3 (73.9)	24.3 (75.7)	22.3 (72.1)	18.7 (65.7)	14.2 (57.6)	9.9 (49.8)	15.5 (59.9)
Record low °C (°F)	−1.8 (28.8)	−2.0 (28.4)	0.0 (32.0)	4.5 (40.1)	8.3 (46.9)	11.5 (52.7)	15.6 (60.1)	16.7 (62.1)	14.7 (58.5)	10.4 (50.7)	5.9 (42.6)	0.3 (32.5)	−2.0 (28.4)
Average precipitation mm (inches)	201.7 (7.94)	205.5 (8.09)	296.5 (11.67)	215.2 (8.47)	256.7 (10.11)	390.3 (15.37)	254.1 (10.00)	169.5 (6.67)	360.5 (14.19)	479.1 (18.86)	277.4 (10.92)	200.2 (7.88)	3,306.7 (130.17)
Average rainy days	14.1	13.7	16.3	12.9	12.7	15.3	10.5	10.8	15.0	16.5	14.0	14.3	166.1
Average relative humidity (%)	68	69	71	77	84	91	92	87	86	82	74	69	79
Mean monthly sunshine hours	84.9	87.8	124.5	139.4	148.5	87.1	137.3	185.9	139.6	107.1	102.6	100.4	1,445.1
Source 1: JMA
Source 2: JMA

== Demographics ==
The population of Hachijō as of 2020 was 7,042, down from 7,613 in 2015.

Comparison of Population Distribution between Hachijō-jima and Japanese National Average
Population Distribution by Age and Sex in Hachijō-jima
■ Hachijō-jima
■ Japan (average)
■ Male
■ Female

1970	10,316
1975	10,318
1980	10,244
1985	10,024
1990	9,420
1995	9,476
2000	9,488
2005	8,837
2010	8,231
2015	7,613

2015 Census, Ministry of Internal Affairs and Communications - Statistics Department

== History ==
During the Edo period, Hachijōjima was known as a place of exile for convicts. This practice ended in the Meiji period, and the island residents developed an economy based on fishing, sericulture, and agriculture. Hachijō Subprefecture was organized on April 1, 1908, and included the villages of Mitsune, Nakanogo, Kashitate, Sueyoshi and Ōkago. The villages of Toruchi and Utsuki on Hachijōkojima were organized on May 3, 1947. The five villages of Hachijōjima merged on October 1, 1954, to form the village of Hachijō. On April 1, 1955, the two villages of Hachijōkojima also merged with the village of Hachijō, which was promoted to town status. However, in March 1966, the residents of Hachijōkojima voted to abandon their island, citing the inaccessibility of basic public services and economic difficulties, and Hachijōkojima became a deserted island from June 1969.

== Economy ==
Fishing and tourism are the mainstays of the economy of Hachijō.

== Education ==
The town government operates three public elementary and three public junior high schools.

Junior high schools:

- Fuji Junior High School (富士中学校)
- Mihara Junior High School (三原中学校)
- Okago Junior High School (大賀郷中学校)

Elementary schools:

- Mihara Elementary School (三原小学校)
- Mitsune Elementary School (三根小学校)
- Okago Elementary School (大賀郷小学校)

The Tōkyō Metropolitan Government Board of Education operates Hachijō High School.

== Transportation ==
Hachijōjima is accessible both by aircraft and by ferry. A pedestrian ferry leaves Tōkyō once every day at 10 p.m., and arrives at Hachijōjima at 9:00 a.m. the following day. Air travel to Hachijojima Airport takes 45 minutes from Tōkyō International Airport (Haneda).

== Sister cities ==
- Maui County, Hawaii, United States

== Gallery ==
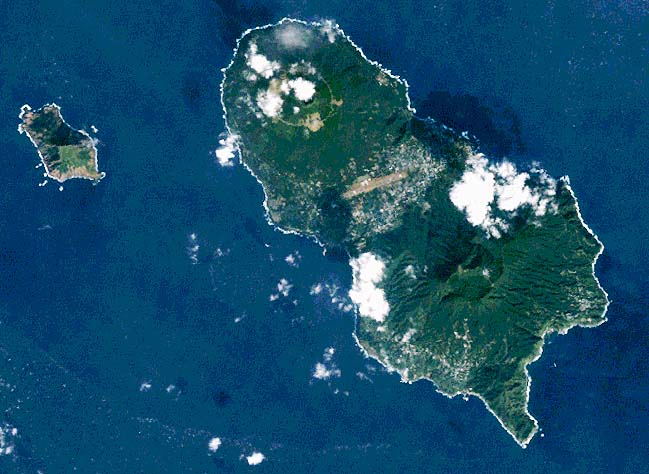
Hachijōjima (right) and Hachijōkojima (left)

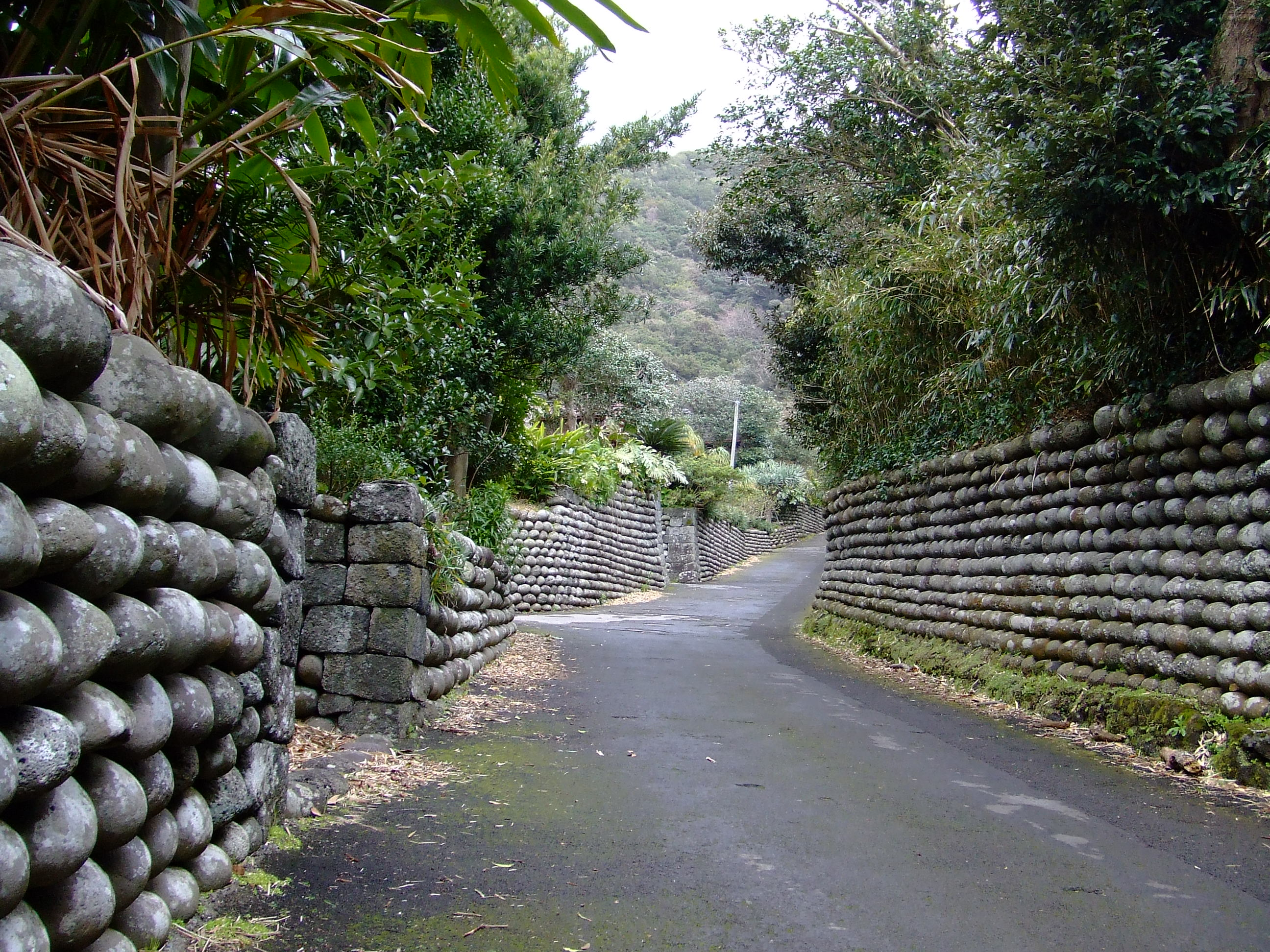
Typical stone walls

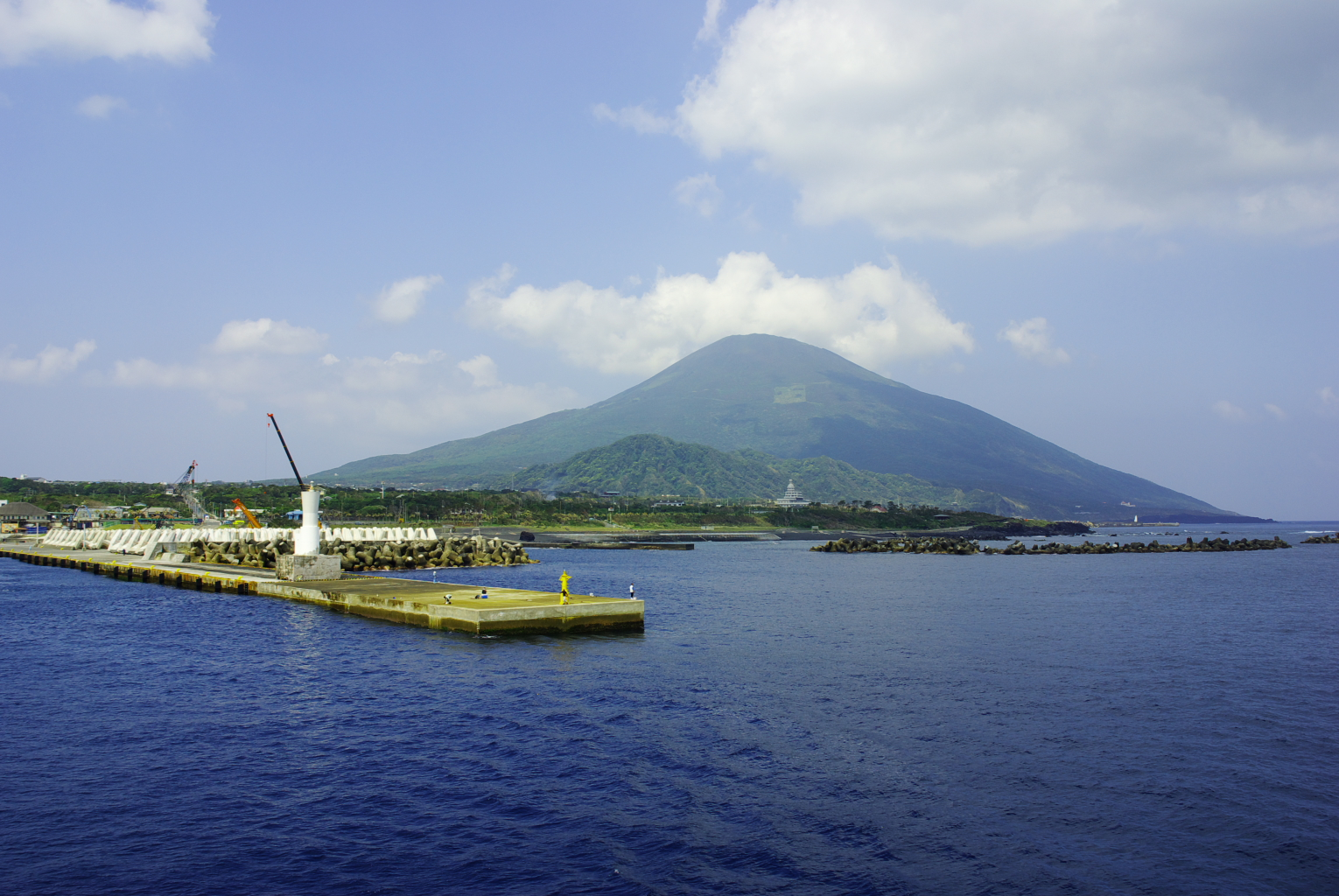
Sokodo Harbor

== See also ==
- Runin: Banished, a 2004 film about convicts exiled to Hachijōjima, and their attempts to escape.
- Battle Royale, a controversial 2000 film filmed on the neighbouring, uninhabited island, Hachijō-kojima, although not set there.
