= Hachijō-kojima =

Small volcanic island in the Philippine Sea

Native name: 八丈小島
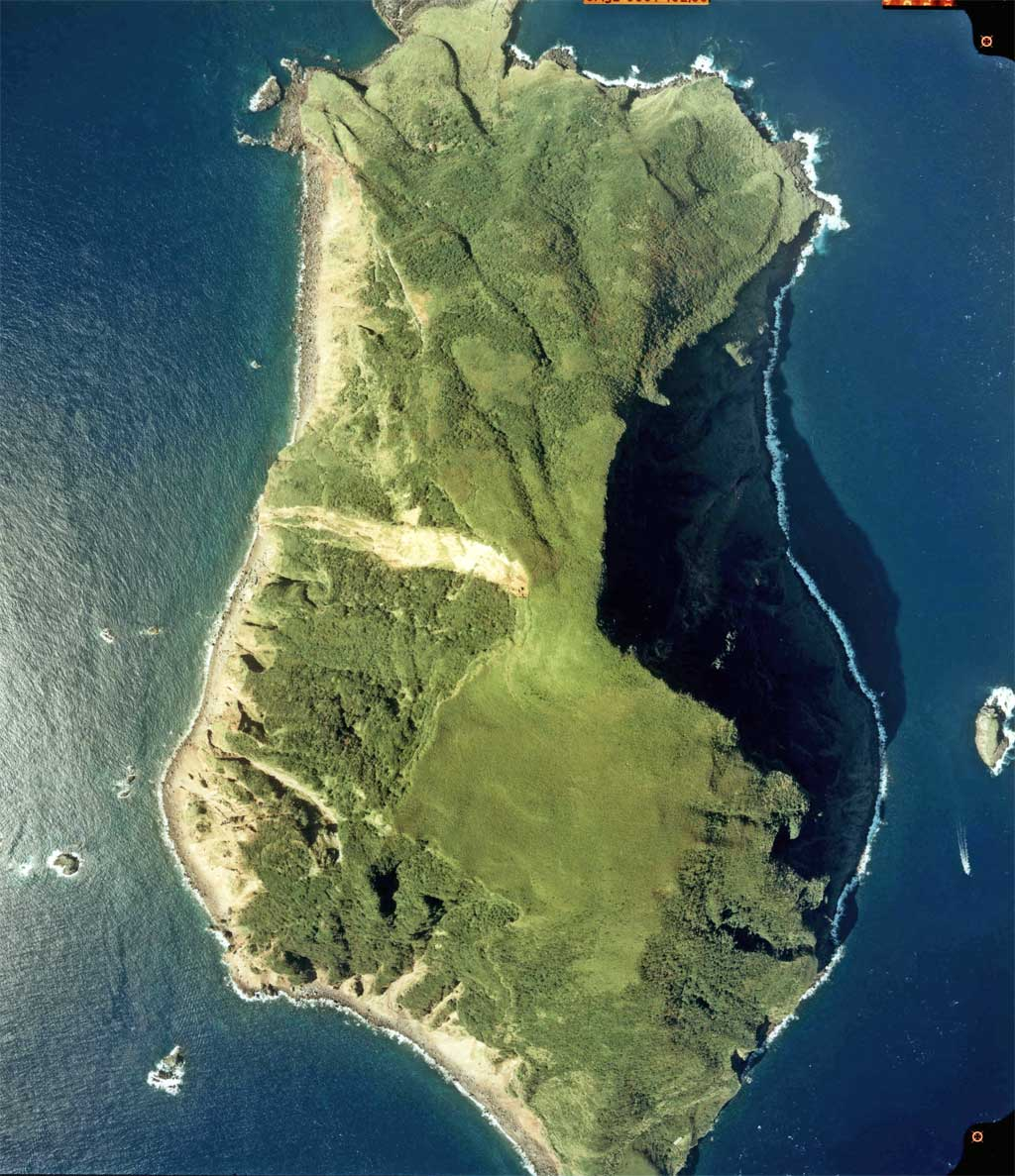
- Hachijō-kojima

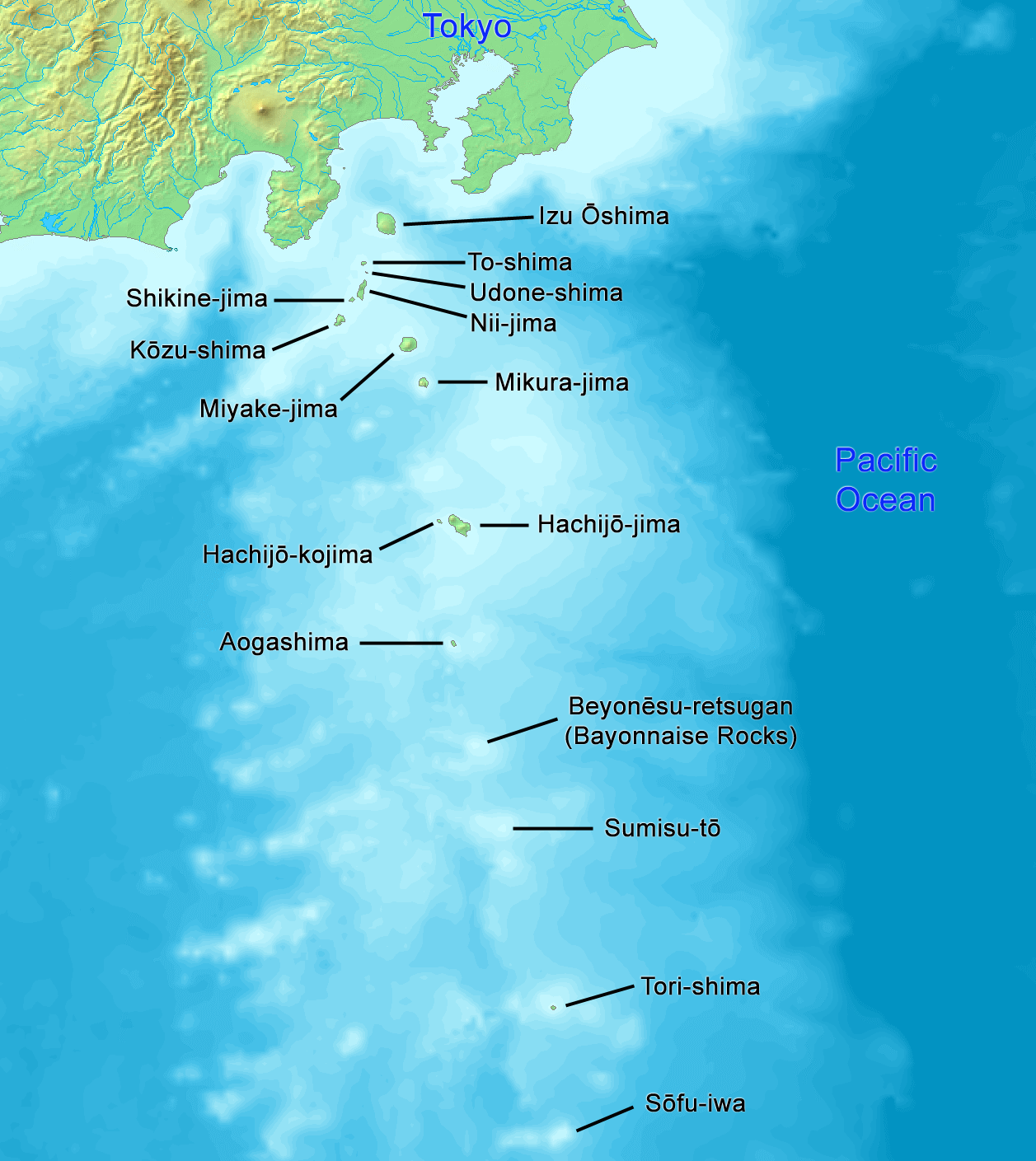

Geography
- Location: Izu Islands
- Coordinates: 33°07′31″N 139°41′18″E
- Archipelago: Izu Islands
- Area: 62,520 m^{2} (673,000 sq ft)
- Length: 3,000 m (10000 ft)
- Width: 1,300 m (4300 ft)
- Coastline: 8,700 m (28500 ft)
- Highest elevation: 616.8 m (2023.6 ft)

Administration
- Japan
- Prefecture: Tokyo
- Subprefecture: Hachijō Subprefecture
- Town: Hachijō

Demographics
- Population: 0

Hachijō-kojima (Japanese: 八丈小島) is a small volcanic island of Japan in the Philippine Sea, approximately 287 kilometres (178 mi) south of Tokyo and 7.5 kilometres (4.7 mi) west of Hachijō-jima, in the northern Izu archipelago. Administratively, the island is within Hachijō, Tokyo, Japan. It has been uninhabited since 1969.

== Geography ==
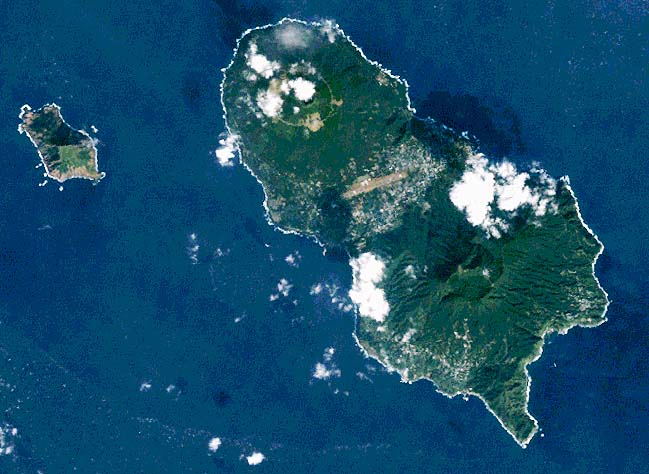
Hachijō-kojima (left) and Hachijō-jima (right)

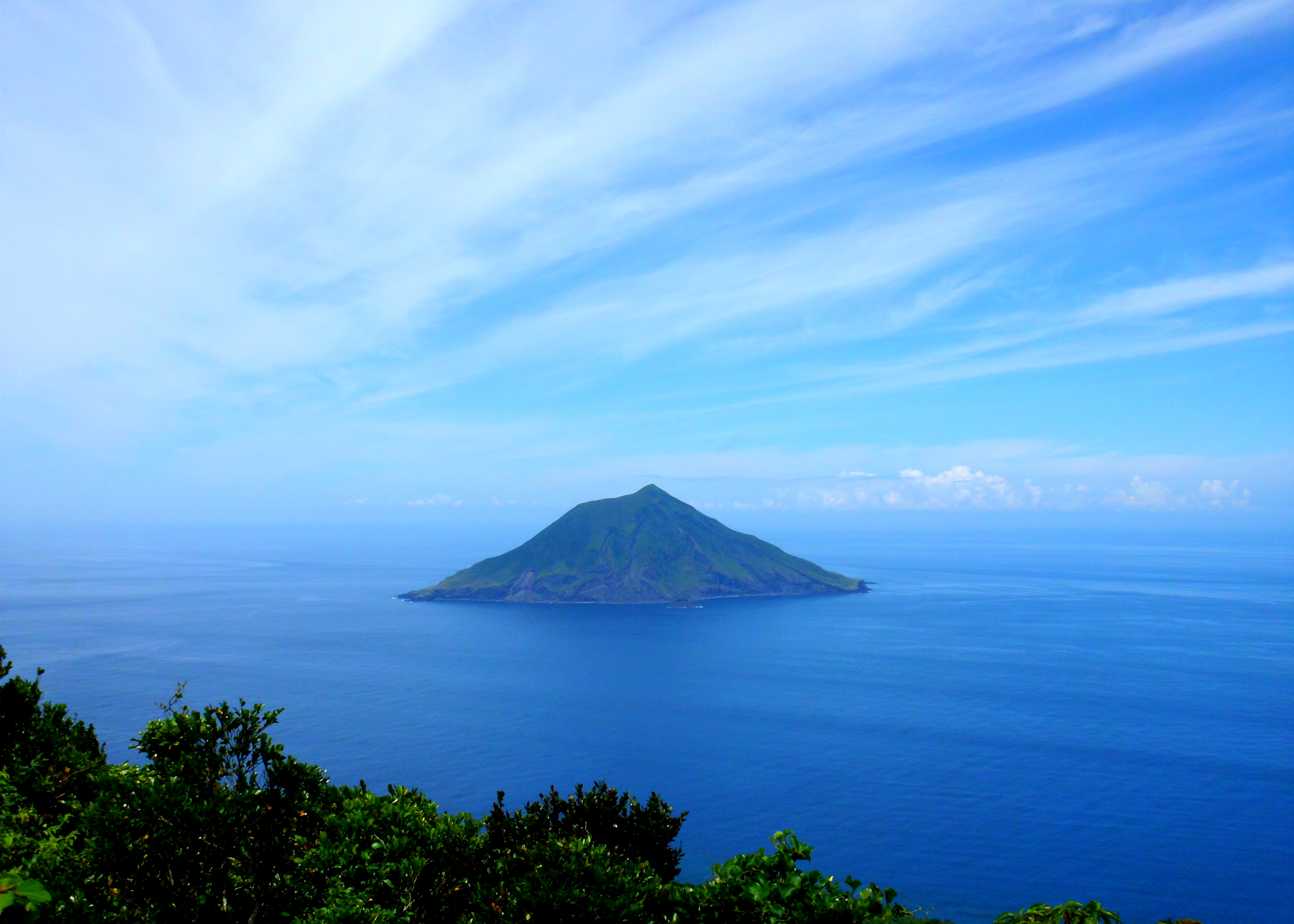
Hachijō-kojima view from Hachijō-fuji

Oriented in the same northwest to southeast direction as Hachijō-jima, the 1.3 × 3 km Hachijōkojima is surrounded by high cliffs. The summit of the island is the mountain Taihei-zan (太平山) with a height of 616.8 metres (2,024 ft). Located in the Kuroshio Current, the area has abundant sea life, and is popular with sports fishermen and scuba divers.

== History ==
During the Heian period, Minamoto no Tametomo was banished to Izu Ōshima after a failed rebellion, but per a semi-legendary story, escaped to Hachijōjima, where he attempted to establish an independent kingdom, and he built his castle on the more easily defended Hachijōkojima. Although the legend has not been verified with historical or archaeological evidence, Hachijōkojima has been inhabited since at least the Muromachi period. As with neighboring Hachijōjima, during the Edo period, the island was a place for exile of convicts. As the strait separating Hachijōkojima from Hachijōjima has a strong current preventing escape by raft or swimming, the more serious criminals were isolated on the island. Its use as a prison came to an end in the Meiji period. During this time, there were two hamlets on the island: Toriuchi (鳥打村, Toriuchi-mura) in the northeast, and Utsuki (宇津木村, Utsuki-mura) in the southwest. These hamlets became part of the town of Hachijō in 1955. The population peaked at 513 residents in the Meiji period, but by 1955 the population had shrunk to only 50. In 1965, the remaining residents voted to abandon the island, citing lack of basic public services (including electricity, healthcare and schools) and the island's inability to support more than a very basic subsistence lifestyle. There have been no residents of Hachijōkojima since 1969, when the last group of 31 left the island.

== See also ==
- Battle Royale (film), a controversial 2000 film filmed on Hachijōkojima although not set on the island.
- Desert island
- List of islands
- List of volcanoes in Japan
