= Aogashima =

Japanese volcanic island in the Philippine Sea

Native name: 青ヶ島
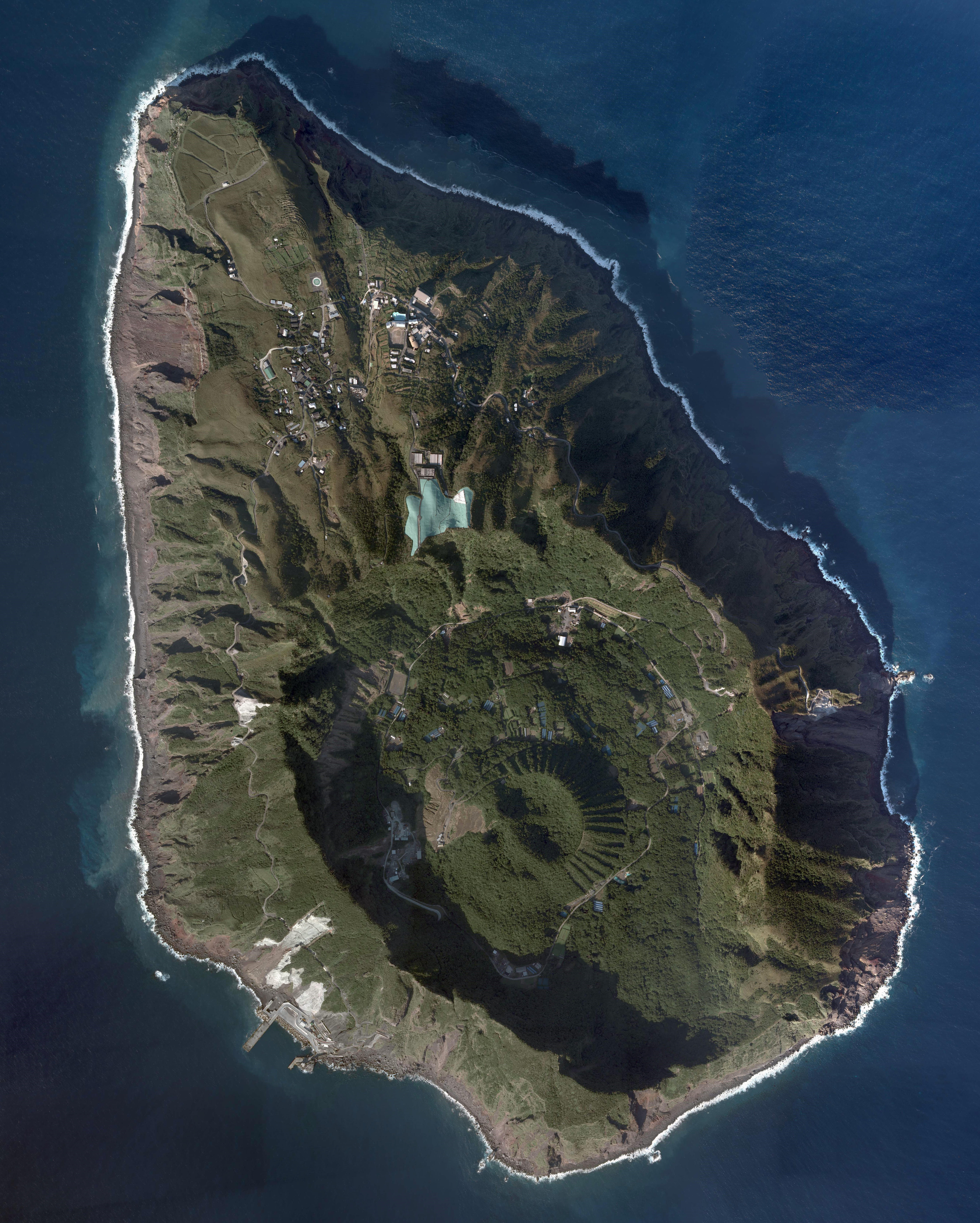

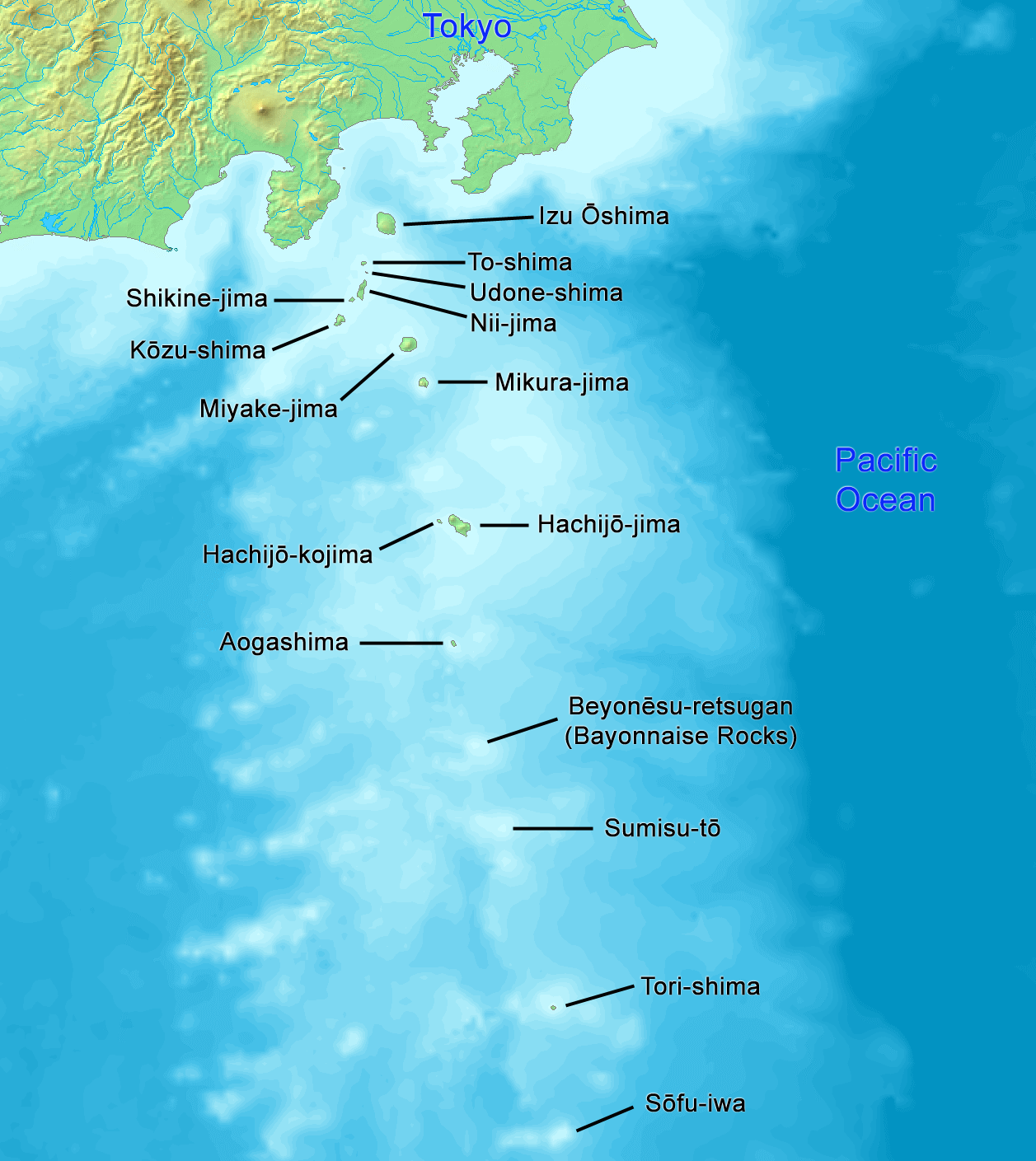

Geography
- Location: Pacific Ocean
- Coordinates: 32°27′25.2″N 139°46′1.2″E
- Archipelago: Izu Islands
- Area: 8.75 km^{2} (3.38 sq mi)
- Length: 3.5 km (2.17 mi)
- Width: 2.5 km (1.55 mi)
- Coastline: 9 km (5.6 mi)
- Highest elevation: 423 m (1388 ft)

Administration
- Japan
- Prefecture: Tokyo
- Subprefecture: Hachijō Subprefecture
- Village: Aogashima

Demographics
- Population: 170 (January 2014)

Aogashima (青ヶ島) is a volcanic island to the south of Japan in northernmost Micronesia. It is the southernmost and most isolated inhabited island of the Izu Islands. The islands border the northeast Philippine Sea and lie north of the Ogasawara Islands. The island lies approximately 358 kilometres (222 mi) south of mainland Tokyo and 64 kilometres (40 mi) south of Hachijō-jima.

The island is administered as the village of Aogashima, which is subordinate to the Hachijō Subprefecture, which itself is governed by the City of Tokyo. The island has an area of 8.75 km^{2} (3.38 sq mi), and, as of 2014, its population is a mere 170 people. This means that the village of Aogashima has the smallest population of any municipality in Japan. Aogashima is also part of the Fuji-Hakone-Izu National Park.

== Geology ==
Aogashima is a complex Quaternary volcanic island 3.5 km in length with a maximum width of 2.5 km, formed by the overlapping remnants of at least four submarine calderas. The island is surrounded by very steep rugged cliffs of layered volcanic deposits. The southern coast also rises to a sharp ridge forming one edge of a caldera named Ikenosawa (池之沢) with a diameter of 1.5 km. The caldera dominates the island, with one point on its southern ridge, Otonbu (大凸部) with a height of 423 metres (1,388 ft), as the island's highest point. The caldera is occupied by a secondary cone named Maruyama (丸山). Still considered a Class-C active volcano by the Japan Meteorological Agency, the last eruption of Aogashima was during a four-year period from 1781–1785. It is located along the Izu–Bonin–Mariana Arc.

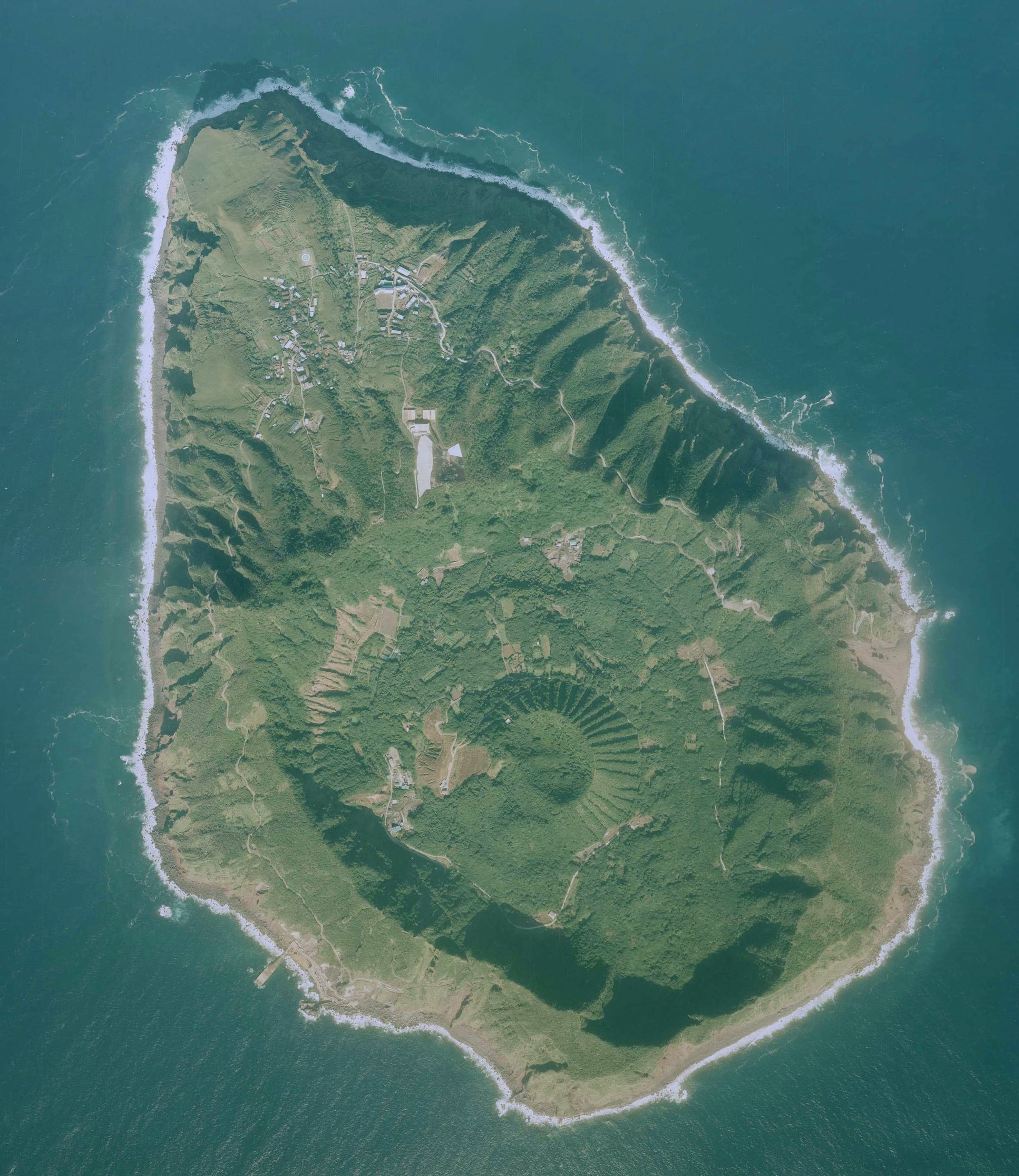
Maruyama is the central cone in the caldera

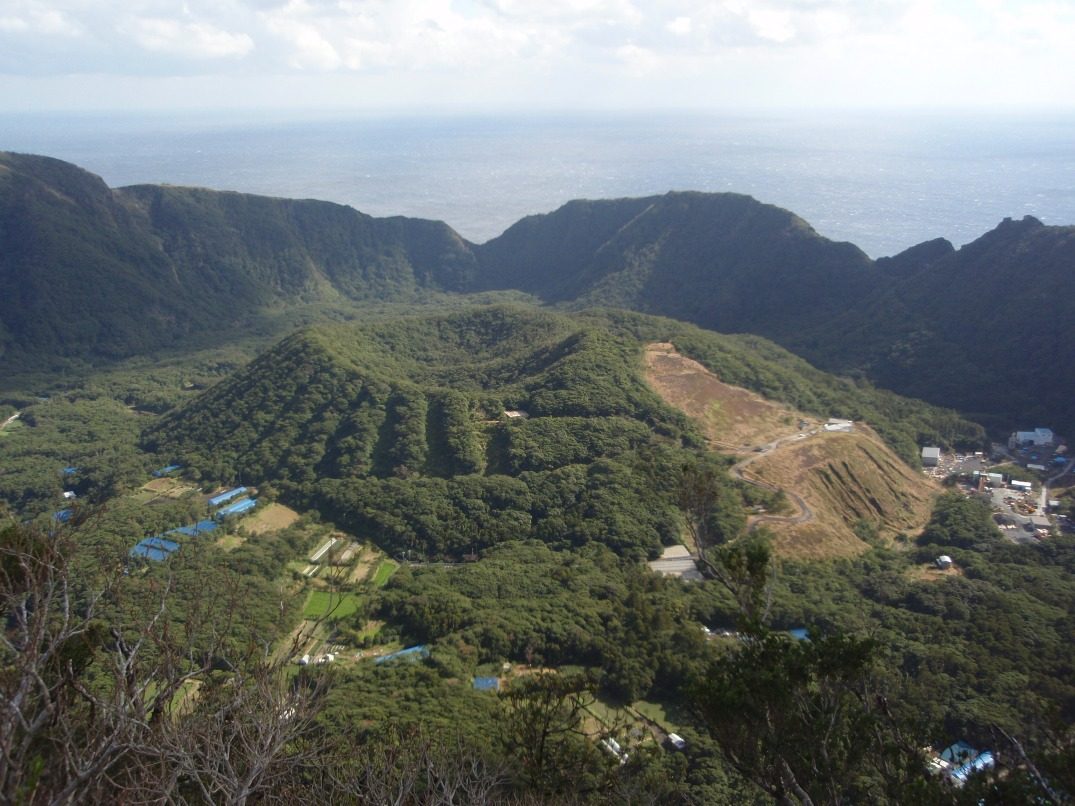
Maruyama in a close view

== Important Bird Area ==
The island has been recognised as an Important Bird Area (IBA) by BirdLife International because it supports populations of Japanese woodpigeons, Pleske's grasshopper warblers, Ijima's leaf-warblers and Izu thrushes.

== History ==
The history of human settlement on Aogashima is uncertain. Most of the people on Aogashima are Japanese. The island is mentioned in Edo period records kept at Hachijō-jima, which recorded volcanic activity in 1652, and from 1670 to 1680. An earthquake swarm in July 1780 was followed by steam rising from the lakes in the Ikenosawa Caldera. Further earthquakes in May 1781 led to an eruption. In April 1783, lava flows from the Maruyama cone resulted in the evacuation of all 63 households on the island. During a massive eruption in 1785, some 130–140 of the population of 327 islanders perished. There has been no significant volcanic activity since the 18th century.

== See also ==
- List of islands of Japan
- List of volcanoes in Japan
