= Tasman =

Tasman most often refers to Abel Tasman (1603–1659), Dutch explorer.

Tasman may also refer to:

== Animals and plants ==
- Tasman booby
- Tasman flax-lily
- Tasman parakeet (disambiguation)
- Tasman starling
- Tasman whale

== People ==
- Tasman (name), a name of Dutch origin, including a list of people with the name

== Places ==
=== New Zealand ===
- within or near Tasman District, a local government district

- Tasman Bay
- Tasman (New Zealand electorate)
- Tasman (settlement)

- in the Southern Alps

- Mount Tasman
- Tasman Glacier
- Tasman Lake
- Tasman River

=== Tasmania, Australia ===
- Tasman Fracture, an ocean trench southwest of Tasmania
- Tasman Island, an island off the southeast coast of the Tasman Peninsula
- Tasman National Park, at the south end of the Tasman Peninsula
- Tasman Outflow, an ocean current south of Tasmania that encircles Antarctica
- Tasman Peninsula, in southeast Tasmania

=== Other ===
- Tasman, Iran, a village in South Khorasan Province, Iran
- Tasman Rip, a marine channel in the South Shetland Islands, Antarctica
- Tasman Sea, between Australia and New Zealand

== Politics and government ==
- Tasman Accord
- Tasman Council, local government area of Tasmania

== Sport ==
- Tasman Rugby Union, the governing body for rugby union in the north of the South Island, New Zealand
- Tasman Series, 1964–1975, a motor racing series in Australia and New Zealand
- Trans Tasman Cup, 2007–2012, an amateur golf tournament between Australia and New Zealand
- Tasman Cup, 1933–2016, an amateur women's golf tournament between Australia and New Zealand
- Trans-Tasman Cup, 1983–1995, an association football competition between Australia and New Zealand
- Trans-Tasman Cup (rugby league), 1935–1995, a rugby league competition between Australia and New Zealand
- Trans-Tasman Trophy for cricket Test match series between Australia and New Zealand

== Technology and commerce ==
- Tasman (layout engine), a discontinued layout engine developed by Microsoft for Internet Explorer
- Tasman Mill, a pulp and paper mill near Kawerau in New Zealand
- Tasman Software, producers of Tasword, an early word processor for personal computers

== Transport ==
- Tasman (VTA), a light rail station on Tasman Drive, San Jose, California, United States
- Tasman Bridge, Hobart, Tasmania
- Tasman Cargo Airlines, based in Sydney, Australia
- Tasman Empire Airways Limited (TEAL), 1940–1965, predecessor of Air New Zealand
- Tasman Highway (A3), an east coast highway in Tasmania between Launceston and Hobart
- Kia Tasman, a mid-size pickup truck

== Other uses ==
- 6594 Tasman, a main-belt asteroid

== See also ==
- Tasmania, an island and state of Australia
