= Masked booby =

- S. d. personata, at Baker Island

Conservation status
- Least Concern (IUCN 3.1)

Scientific classification
- Kingdom: Animalia
- Phylum: Chordata
- Class: Aves
- Order: Suliformes
- Family: Sulidae
- Genus: Sula
- Species: S. dactylatra

Binomial name
- Sula dactylatra Lesson, 1831

Subspecies
- See text
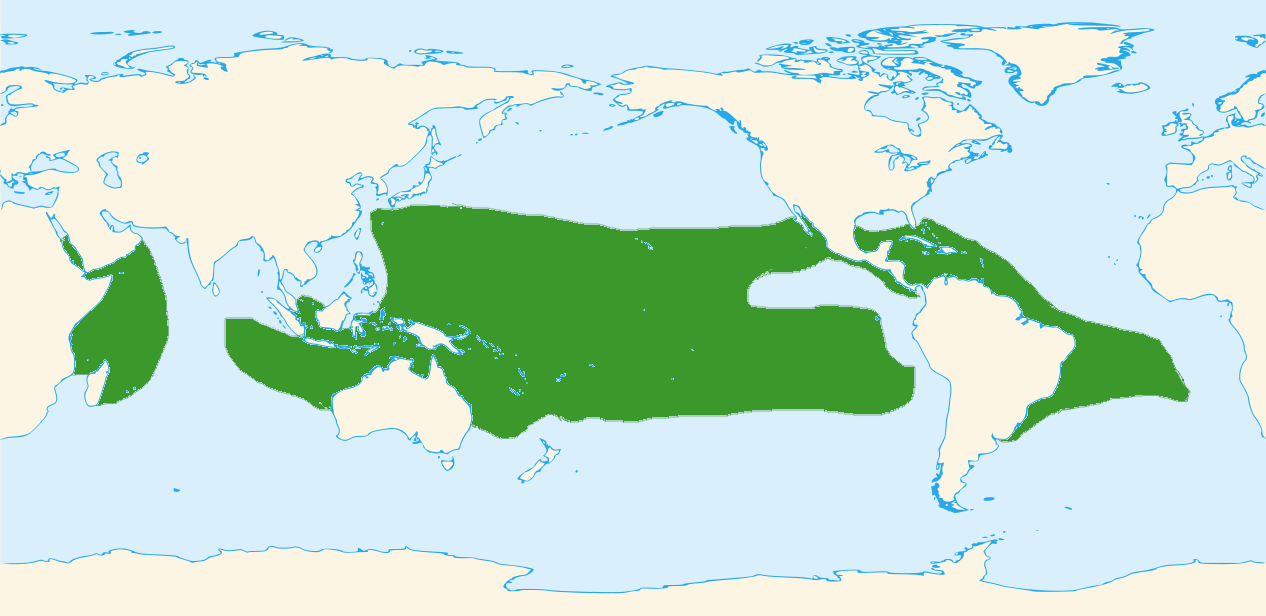
- Range (in green)

Species of bird

The masked booby (Sula dactylatra), also called the masked gannet or the blue-faced booby, is a large seabird of the booby and gannet family, Sulidae. First described by the French naturalist René-Primevère Lesson in 1831, the masked booby is one of six species of booby in the genus Sula. It has a typical sulid body shape, with a long pointed yellowish bill, long neck, aerodynamic body, long slender wings and pointed tail. The adult is bright white with black wings, a black tail and a dark face mask; at 75–85 cm (30–33 in) long, it is the largest species of booby. The sexes have similar plumage. This species ranges across tropical oceans, except in the eastern Atlantic and eastern Pacific. In the latter, it is replaced by the Nazca booby (Sula granti), which was formerly regarded as a subspecies of masked booby.

Nesting takes place in colonies, generally on islands and atolls far from the mainland and close to deep water required for foraging. Territorial when breeding, the masked booby performs agonistic displays to defend its nest. Potential and mated pairs engage in courtship and greeting displays. The female lays two chalky white eggs in a shallow depression on flat ground away from vegetation. The chicks are born featherless, but are soon covered in white down. The second chick born generally does not survive and is killed by its elder sibling. These birds are spectacular plunge divers, plunging into the ocean at high speed in search of prey—mainly flying fish. The species faces few threats; although its population is declining, it is considered to be a least-concern species by the International Union for Conservation of Nature (IUCN). The masked booby primarily feeds on flying fish and squid, which it captures through high-speed plunge diving. Breeding Colonies are typically located on remote islands, where reduced predation allows for successful nesting.

== Taxonomy ==
The French naturalist René Lesson was a member of the crew on the La Coquille, captained by Louis Isidore Duperrey, on its voyage around the world undertaken between August 1822 and March 1825. In the multi-volume publication by Duperrey about the voyage, Lesson authored the ornithological sections. In his 1829 account of the visit to Ascension Island in the South Atlantic Ocean, Lesson mentioned encountering masked boobies, and in a footnote proposed the binomial name Sula dactylatra. Lesson subsequently provided a formal description of the masked booby in 1831. The specific epithet combines the Ancient Greek δάκτυλος (dáktul), meaning 'finger', and the Latin ater, meaning 'black'. "Black fingers" refers to the splayed wingtips in flight. The Swedish zoologist Carl Jakob Sundevall described the species as Dysporus cyanops in 1837 from a subadult collected in the Atlantic Ocean on 6 September 1827. The species name was derived from the Ancient Greek words κύανος (kúanos), meaning 'blue', and ὄψ (óps), meaning 'face'.

The English ornithologist and bird artist John Gould described Sula personata in 1846 from Australia, the species name being the Latin adjective personata, meaning 'masked'. Gould adopted the name Sula cyanops in his 1865 Handbook to the Birds of Australia. Sundevall's binomial name was followed as Lesson's 1829 record did not sufficiently describe the species; however, in 1911, the Australian amateur ornithologist Gregory Mathews pointed out that although Lesson's 1829 account did not describe the bird, his 1831 account did, and thus predated Sundevall by six years, and hence Sula dactylactra had priority. The American Ornithological Union followed in the 17th supplement to their checklist in 1920.

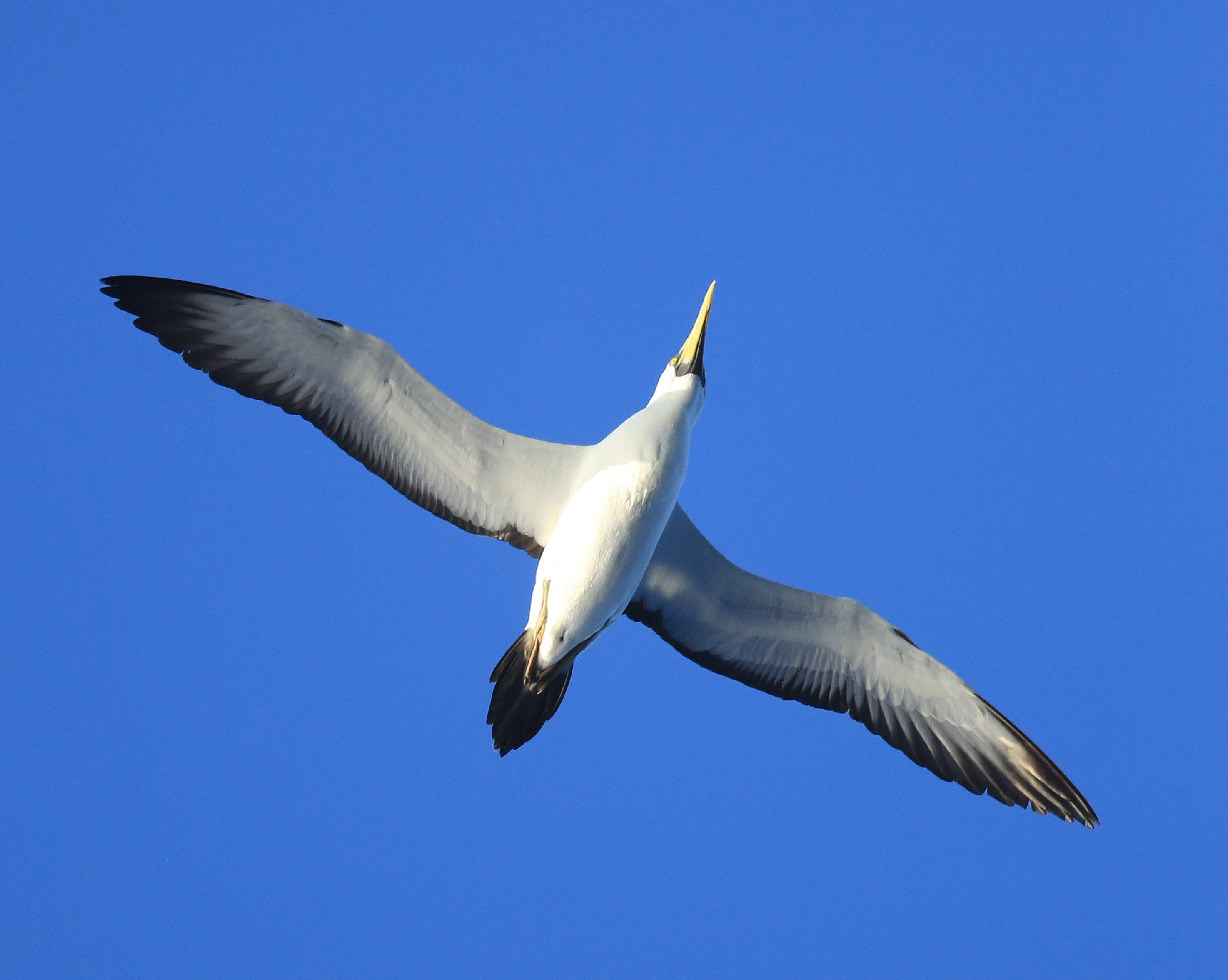
S. d. dactylatra in flight, Grand Turk Island

"Masked booby" has been designated the official common name by the International Ornithologists' Union (IOC). The species has also been called the masked gannet, blue-faced booby, white booby (for its plumage), and whistling booby (for its distinctive call). The Australian ornithologist Doug Dorward promoted the name "white booby" as he felt the blue coloration of its face was less prominent than that of the red-footed booby (Sula sula).

=== Evolution ===
The masked booby is one of six species of booby in the genus Sula. A 2011 genetic study (depicted below) using both nuclear and mitochondrial DNA showed the masked and Nazca boobies (Sula granti) to be each other's closest relatives, their lineage diverging from a line that gave rise to the blue-footed (Sula nebouxii) and Peruvian boobies (Sula variegata). The masked and Nazca boobies were divergent enough to indicate that the latter, formerly regarded as a subspecies of the former, should be classified as a separate species. Molecular evidence suggests they most likely diverged between 0.8 and 1.1 million years ago. Complex water currents in the eastern Pacific may have established an environmental barrier leading to speciation. Subfossil bones 14,000 years old belonging to the species have been found in deposits on St. Helena Island.

- - Red-footed booby (Sula sula)
  - - Brown booby (Sula leucogaster)
    - - - Masked booby (Sula dactylatra)
        - Nazca booby (Sula granti)
      - - Blue-footed booby (Sula nebouxii)
        - Peruvian booby (Sula variegata)

There is a clinal change in size across the masked booby's range. Birds in the Atlantic are the smallest, with the size increasing westwards though the Pacific to the Indian Ocean, where the largest individuals are found. Genetic analysis using mtDNA control region sequences shows that populations in the Indian and Pacific Oceans greatly expanded around 180,000 years ago, and that these became separated from Atlantic populations around 115,000 years ago. Furthermore, within each ocean, there is evidence of reduced gene flow between populations that does not correspond with any physical barrier.

== Subspecies ==
Four subspecies are recognized by the International Ornithologists' Union.

S. d. dactylatra, in Brazil
- S. d. dactylatra Lesson, 1831

Breeds in the Caribbean and some Atlantic islands including Ascension Island. There is significant genetic divergence between birds on Boatswain Bird Island off Ascension and those from Monito Island off Puerto Rico.

- S. d. melanops Hartlaub, 1859

Breeds in the western Indian Ocean. The German ornithologist Gustav Hartlaub described this taxon in 1859 from Maydh Island off the coast of Somalia near the town of the same name. He noted its black mask and blue-grey feet to be distinct from Sundevall's cyanops with a blue face, and Lesson's dactylatra with yellow feet. The subspecies name is derived from the Ancient Greek words μέλανος (mélanos), meaning 'black', and ὄψ (óps), meaning 'face'.

- S. d. tasmani van Tets, Meredith, Fullagar & Davidson, 1988 (includes S. d. fullagari as a junior synonym): Tasman booby

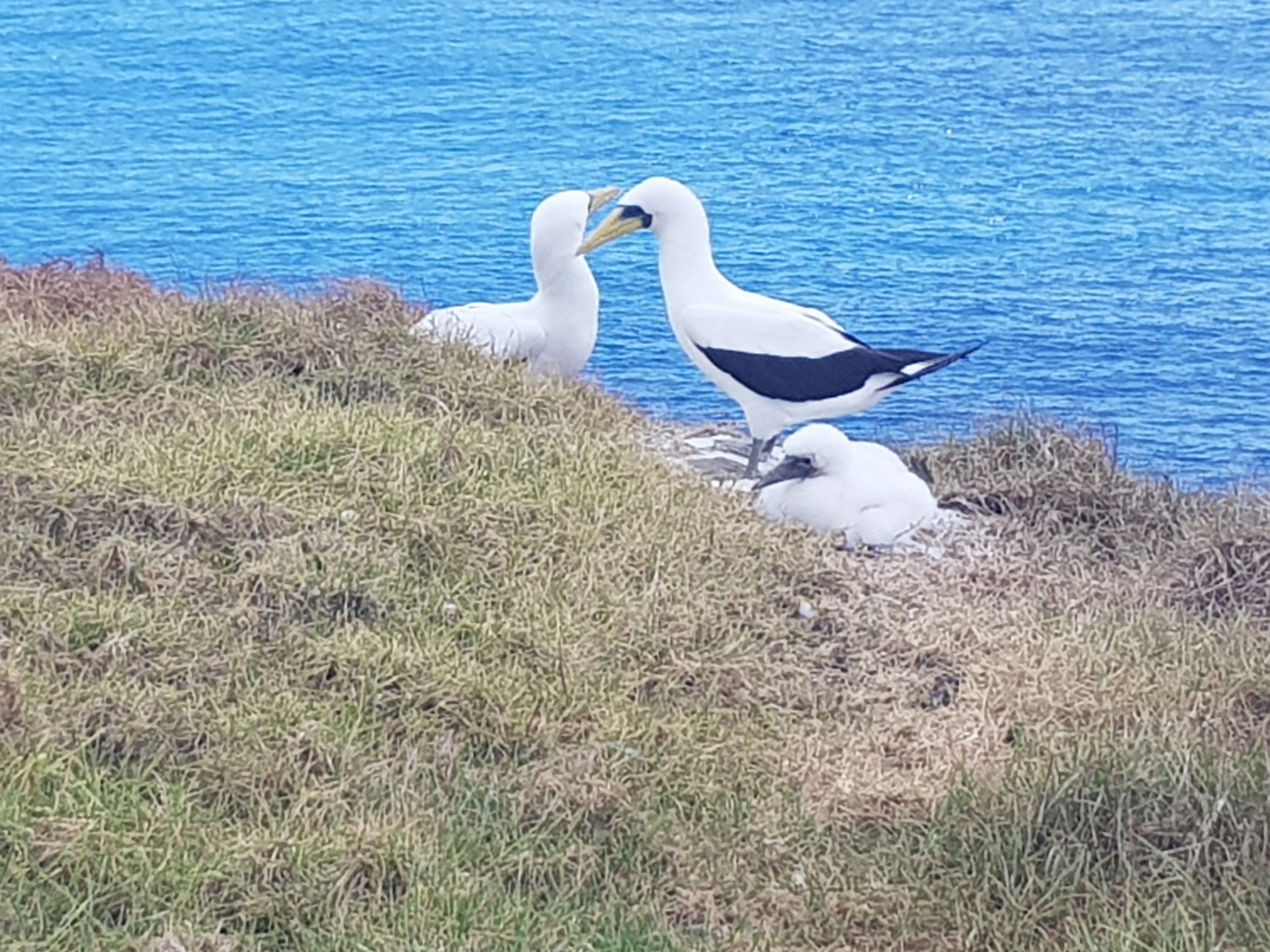
A breeding pair of S. d. tasmani and their chick, at Norfolk Island

The form breeding on Lord Howe and the Kermadec Islands. The New Zealand naturalist Walter Oliver had noted that this bird had dark brown rather than pale irises in 1930, but it was not until 1990 that it was formally investigated by R. M. O'Brien and J. Davies and found to also have longer wings than other populations. They classified it as a new subspecies: S. d. fullagari. Meanwhile, large prehistoric specimens known from the Lord Howe and Norfolk Island had been classified as a separate species, S. tasmani, in 1988, thought to have become extinct due to Polynesian and then European seafarers and settlers. However, the paleoecologist Richard Holdaway and colleagues cast doubt on the distinctness of the fossil taxon in 2001, and a 2010 review by the New Zealand biologist Tammy Steeves and colleagues of the fossil material and DNA found the two overlapped considerably, and hence the extinct and living entities were found to be the same taxon, now known as S. d. tasmani as this name has priority over S. d. fullagari. Fieldwork in the Kermadec Islands indicates the bills of adults are bright yellow, and that adult males had brighter yellow feet than females.

- S. d. personata, at Midway Atoll
  S. d. personata Gould, 1846 (includes S. d. californica and S. d. bedouti)

Breeds in the central and western Pacific and around Australia, as well as off Mexico and on Clipperton Island in the Pacific Ocean off the coast of Central America. Birds of the latter two locations have been separated as subspecies californica, and the north west Australian population has been named as subspecies bedouti, but neither is usually considered distinct; the American biologist Robert Pitman and colleagues found no consistent differences between these three subspecies.

The subspecies differ slightly in size and sometimes also in the colour of the irises, bill, legs and feet. The bill of the nominate subspecies S. d. dactylatra is pale yellow with a greenish tinge, sometimes greyish at the base. The S. d. melanops has an orange-yellow bill and olive-grey legs, the race tasmani has dark brown irises and dark grey-green legs and S. d. personata has olive to blueish-grey legs. During the breeding season, the leg colour of male S. d. dactylatra and S. d. tasmani contains more yellow-red than those of the females.

== Description ==
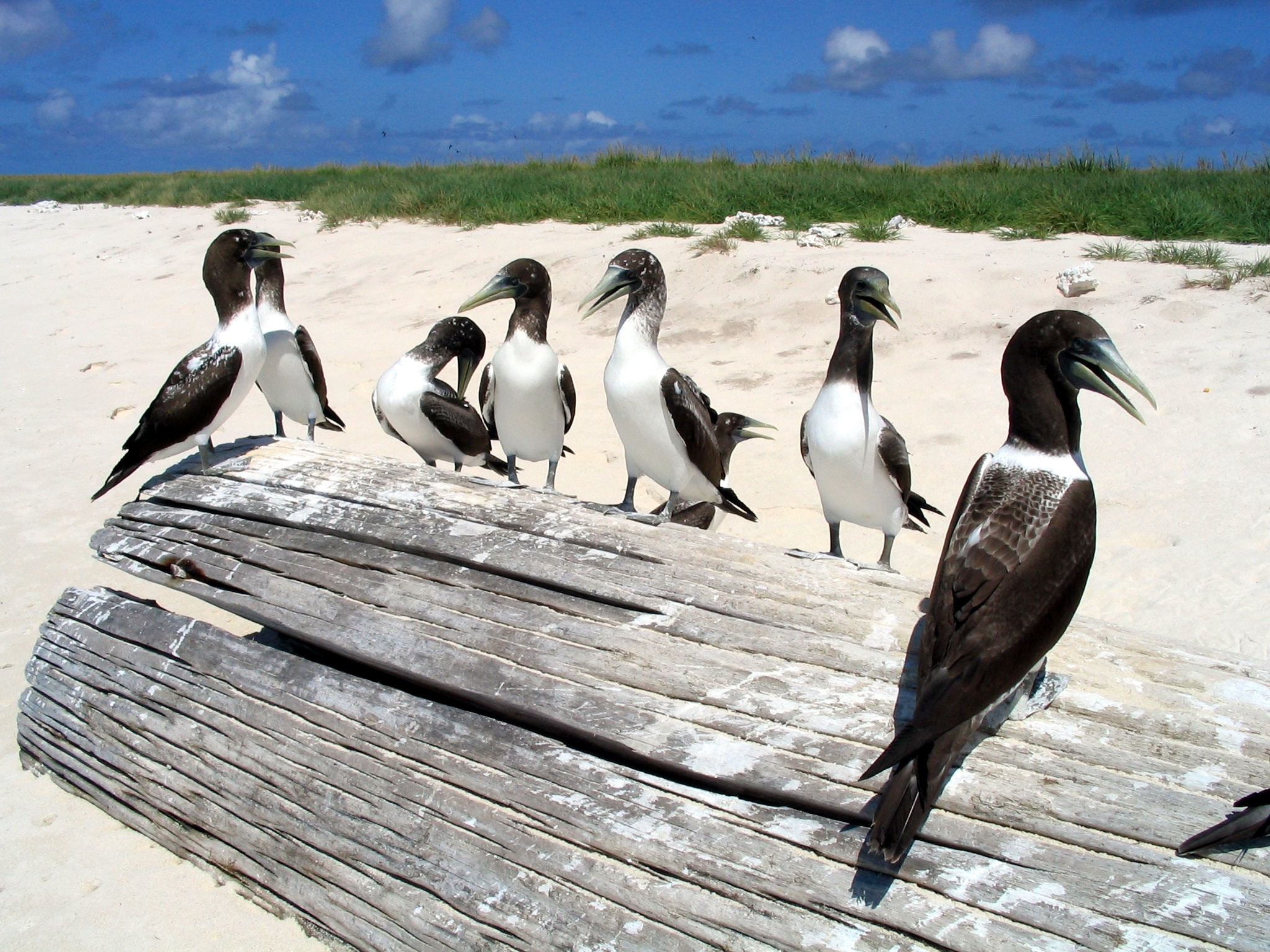
Juvenile S. d. personata on Kure Atoll in the Hawaiian island chain

The largest species of booby, the masked booby ranges from 75 to 85 cm (30 to 33 in) long, with a 160–170 cm (63–67 in) wingspan and 1.2–2.2 kg (2.6–4.9 lb) weight. It has a typical sulid body shape, with a long pointed bill, long neck, aerodynamic body, long slender wings and pointed tail. The adult is bright white with dark wings and a dark tail. The sexes have similar plumage with no seasonal variation, but females are on average slightly heavier and larger than males. The bare skin around the face, throat and lores is described either as black or blue-black. It contrasts with the white plumage and gives a mask-like appearance. Conical in shape, the bill is longer than the head and tapers to a slightly downcurved tip. Backward-pointing serrations line the mandibles. The primaries, secondaries, humerals and rectrices are brown-black. The inner webs of the secondaries are white at the base. The underwing is white except for the brown-black flight-feathers that are not covered by the white coverts. The legs are yellow-orange or olive. The iris is yellow.

The juvenile is a streaked or mottled grey-brown on the head and upperparts, with a whitish neck collar. The wings are dark brown and underparts are white. Its bill is yellowish, face is blue-grey and iris a dark brown. Older immature birds have a broader white collar and rump, and more and more white feathers on the head until the head is wholly white by 14 to 15 months of age. Full adult plumage is acquired three to four months before the bird turns three years old.

The masked booby is usually silent at sea, but is noisy at the nesting colonies. The main call of male birds is a descending whistle; that of females is a loud honk.

=== Similar species ===
The adult masked booby is distinguished from the related Nazca booby by its yellow rather than orange bill, larger size and less distinctive sexual dimorphism. The latter nests on steep cliffs rather than flat ground. The white morph of the red-footed booby is similar but smaller. Abbott's booby (Papasula abbotti) has a more wholly black upperwing, and a longer neck and tail and larger head, while the Cape gannet (Morus capensis) and the Australasian gannet (Morus serrator) have a buff-yellow crown, shorter tail, white humerals and a grey rather than yellowish bill. The juvenile masked booby resembles the brown booby (Sula leucogaster), though adults of that species have clearly demarcated brown and white plumage.

== Distribution and habitat ==
The masked booby is found across tropical oceans between the 30th parallel north and 30th parallel south. In the Indian Ocean it ranges from the coastlines of the Arabian Peninsula and East Africa across to Sumatra and Western Australia, though it is not found off the coast of the Indian subcontinent. Off the Western Australian coastline it is found as far south as the Dampier Archipelago. In the Pacific, it ranges from Brisbane eastwards. It is found in the Caribbean and Atlantic Ocean south to Ascension Island. In the eastern Pacific off the coast of Colombia and Ecuador, the masked booby is replaced by the Nazca booby. A vagrant was rescued in 2015 in Newport, Oregon.

In the Atlantic, Caribbean birds occasionally wander north to warm southern Gulf Stream waters off the eastern seaboard of the United States, with single records from Island Beach in New Jersey and New York. There are summer records from Delaware Bay, and Worcester County, Maryland, as well as waters off the coast of Spain.

During the monsoon season (midyear), the masked booby is an occasional vagrant along the western coast of India, with records from Kerala, Karnataka, and Maharashtra states. It is a vagrant to the Caroline Islands north of New Guinea.

=== Breeding colonies ===
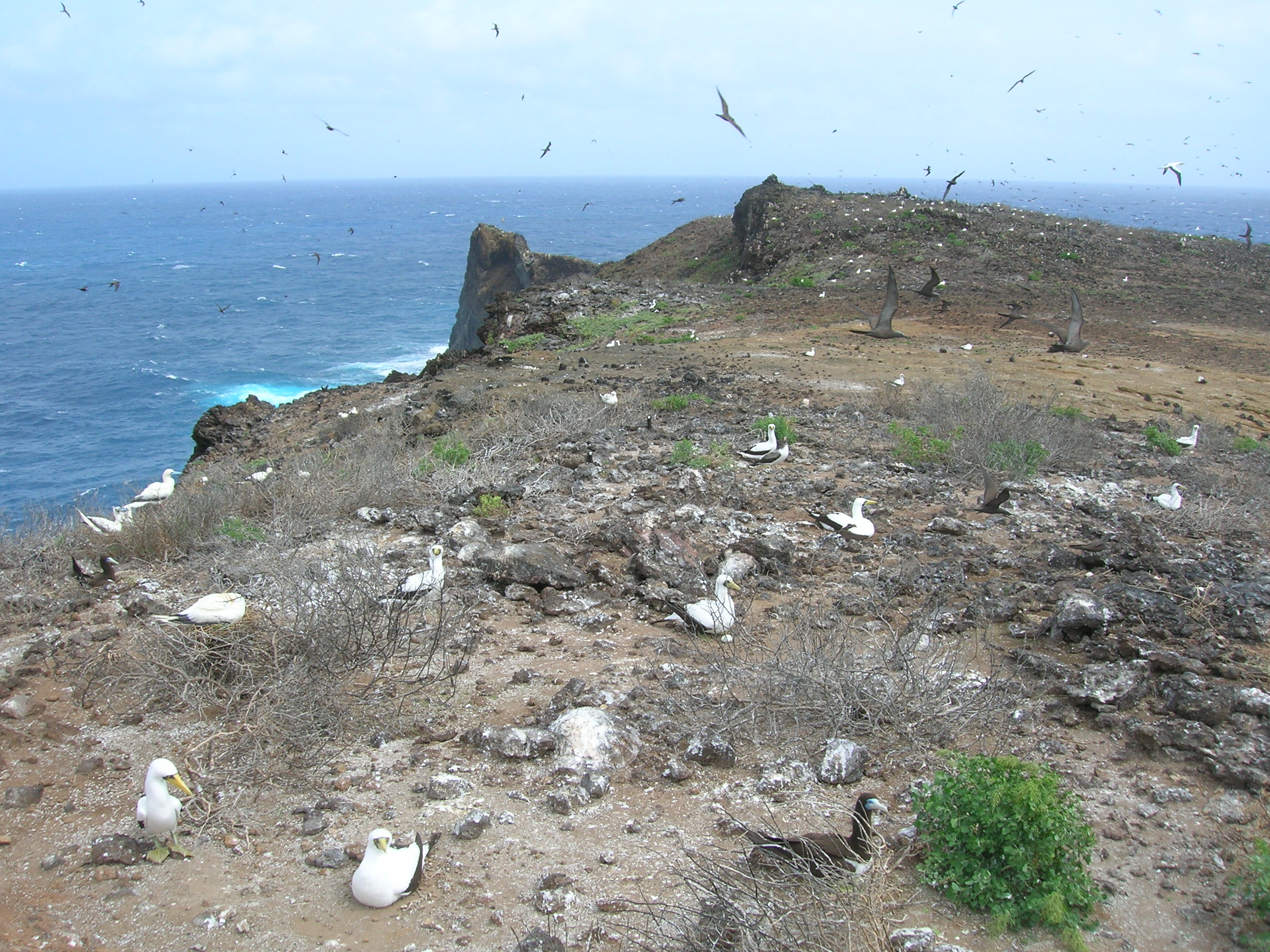
Breeding sites in areas relatively free of vegetation, Oahu

Breeding colonies are located on remote islands, atolls and cays. Lord Howe Island is the southernmost colony. Deep water nearby is important for feeding. As an example, waters around Raine Island, at the edge of the Great Barrier Reef, are anywhere from 180 to 3,700 m (590 to 12,140 ft) deep. On these landforms, masked boobies select sites of generally flat, bare or exposed open ground that lie above the high-tide level with access to the ocean. During the breeding season, the species remains near the colony. At other times, juveniles and some adults disperse widely, though some remain at the colony year-round. Most (but not all) birds return to breed at the colony of their birth; once they begin breeding at a site, they will return there annually.

The largest masked booby colony is on Clipperton Island in the eastern Pacific Ocean, a desert atoll southwest of Mexico. In 2003, 112,000 birds were counted, having recovered from 150 individuals in 1958. The population had suffered from the introduction of feral pigs in the 1890s. These pigs preyed on the crabs that ate the vegetation. After the elimination of pigs in 1964, the crab population rose and vegetation largely disappeared. This was beneficial to the boobies, as they prefer open ground. Clipperton is on a narrow ridge surrounded by deep water. The colony on Lord Howe Island numbered in the thousands at the time of the island's discovery in 1788, but has declined to under 500 pairs—mostly on offshore islets with the remainder on two hard-to-access headlands—by 2005. Hunting by humans is thought to have played a role; although rats were introduced to the island in 1918, there has been no evidence they are able to kill chicks or eggs—possibly due to the size of the adult boobies. The masked booby was first recorded breeding on Philip Island off Norfolk Island in 1908, with devegetation by feral animals creating the open ground preferred by the species. By 2007, an estimated 300 pairs were breeding over the island, though the island flora's regeneration after the removal of feral animals might begin to limit suitable nesting sites. In 2006, two pairs nested in a brown booby colony on Morros del Potosí (White Friars Rocks) near Zihuatanejo in southern Mexico.

Major nesting areas in the Atlantic include Rocas Atoll off the coast of Brazil, Ascension Island in the south Atlantic, and five islands of the Campeche Bank in the Gulf of Mexico. The species attempted to nest at Dry Tortugas in the Gulf of Mexico over 1984 and 1985; 19 pairs were recorded there in 1998.

== Behaviour ==
The masked booby generally flies at least 7 m (23 ft) in height, and at speeds of up to 70 km/h (43 mph). It alternates between gliding and active flying with strong periodic wingbeats. It is often encountered alone, or in a small group when returning to its colony.

Regarding the masked booby's longevity, a bird tagged at Nepean Island (off Norfolk Island) in September 1979 was recovered and released after being caught in fishing gear 24 years and 9.9 months later some 713 km (443 mi) away off the Isle of Pines, New Caledonia in July 2004. The longest distance travelled is 3,152 km (1,959 mi); a bird tagged at Raine Island in the Great Barrier Reef in December 1981 was picked up and released at Phillip Island (off Norfolk Island) in December 1986.

=== Breeding and courtship ===
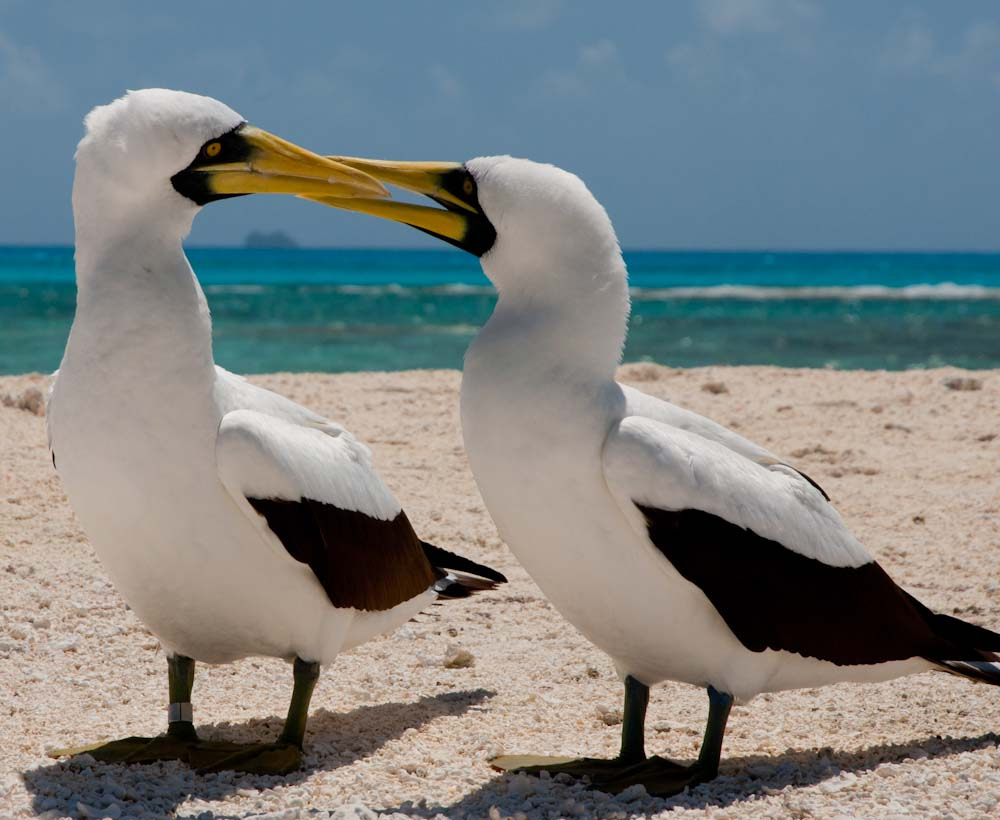
S. d. personata, courting display, French Frigate Shoals

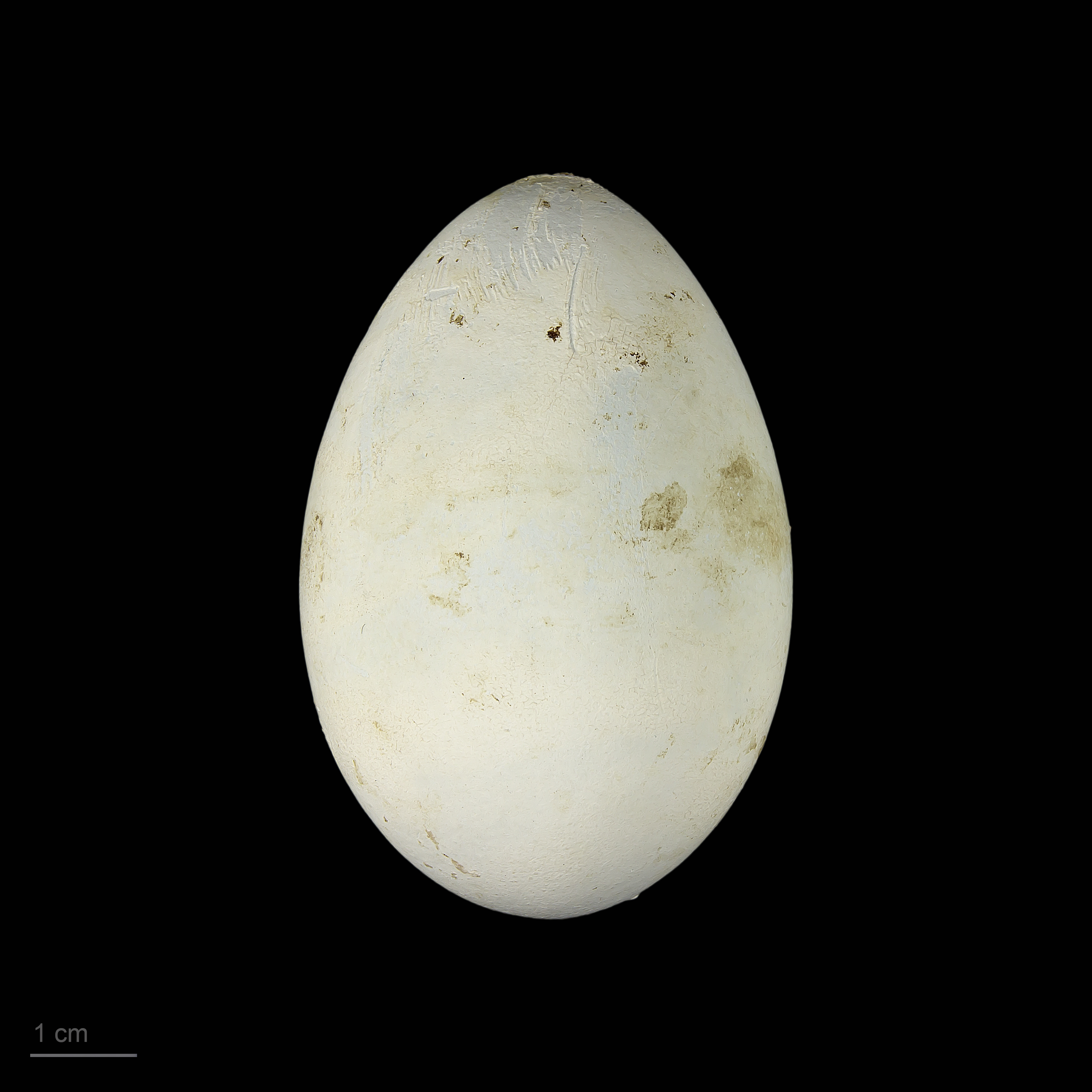
Egg

The masked booby begins breeding by around four or five years of age, though can occasionally do so at three years old. Adults form monogamous relationships with many pairs remaining together over multiple breeding seasons. Highly territorial when nesting, single males and mated pairs engage in agonistic displays to mark their ground against neighbours and interlopers. The male advertises his territory to females by flight circuiting—making a short flight and holding his wings in a 'V' shape and making a call as he lands. The mated pair engages in outposting as other boobies fly overhead, stretching their necks out and forward. More direct trespassers are confronted with a yes-no headshaking, in which the booby shakes its head from side to side or up and down and ruffles its head feathers to make its head look bigger and facial markings more prominent. It may cock its tail and hold its wings up away from its body. Neighbouring boobies may escalate by jabbing and lunging at each other. In the pelican posture, a bird tucks the tip of its bill into its chest, possibly positioned to avoid injury to others. This posture is used against intruders or as advertising for a mate.

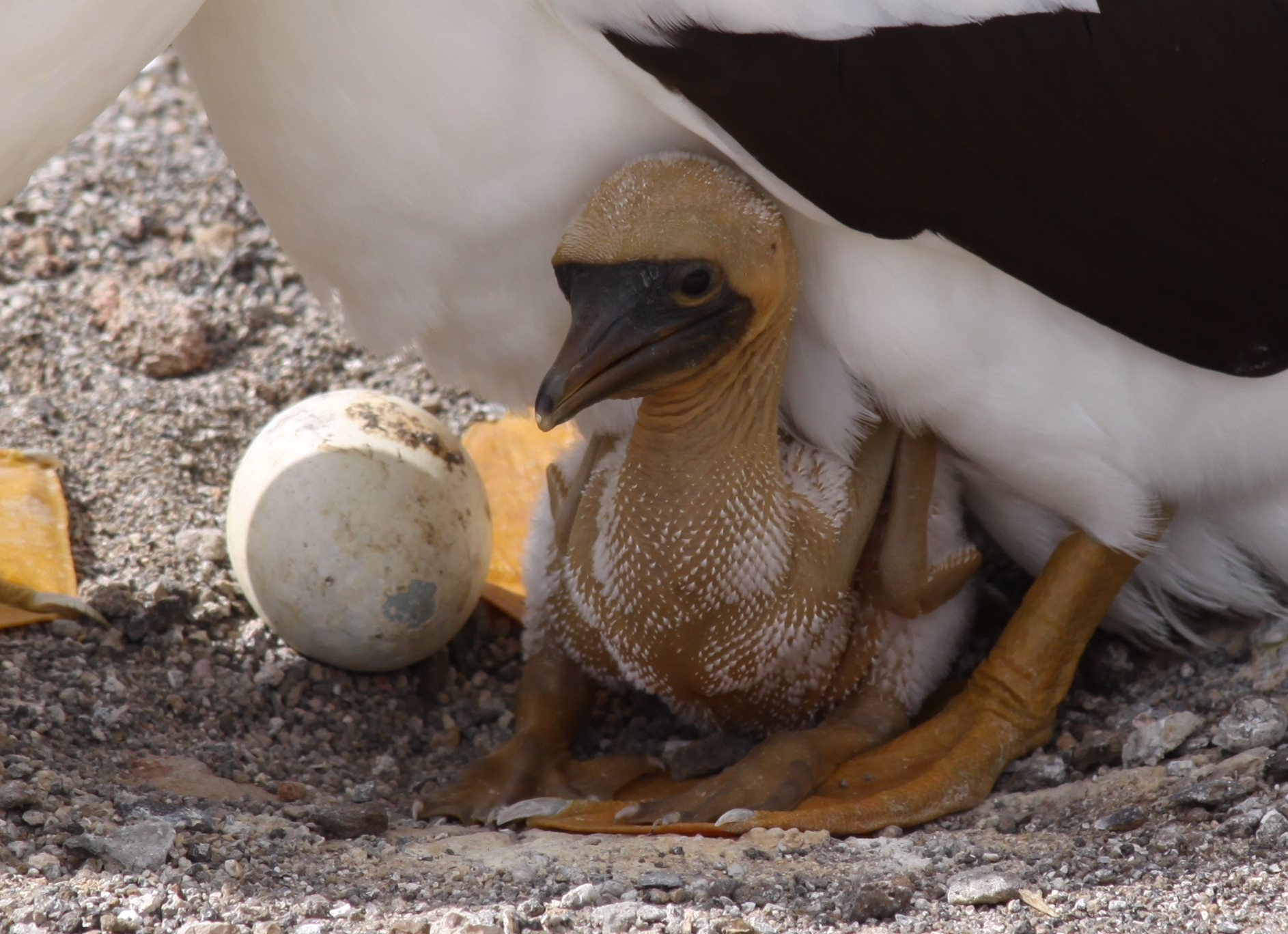
S. d. dactylatra chick and egg, at Ascension Island

S. d. dactylatra adult and chick, in Brazil

There are several displays related to the establishment and maintenance of pair-bonding. The male initiates sky-pointing when a female approaches or leaves his territory. In this display, he paces slowly with his neck and bill pointed upwards—between vertical and 45 degrees—with wings partly raised and whistling faintly with an open bill. In a gazing display, one bird stares at another of the opposite sex; this generally leads to other displays. Pairs engage in a (mostly) gentler form of jabbing display, and allopreening. In an oblique headshake, a bird flings its head vigorously. The male may also parade in front of the female, walking with an exaggerated high-stepping gait and intermittently tucking his head in his breast, after collecting nesting material and before the pair begins laying. The male presents small sticks and debris as nesting material in a gesture of symbolic nest-building, which leads to copulation. Afterwards, the pair engages in more symbolic nest-building. The twigs and debris are cleared away later as none is actually used in adorning the nest while in use.

Breeding takes place at different times of year throughout its range. On the Cocos (Keeling) Islands, egg-laying takes place from January to July, peaking in June, with juvenile birds from April to December. On Moulter Cay in the Coral Sea, breeding takes place year-round, with egg-laying peaking from September to early November, while on nearby Raine Island birds begin laying in or after August, likely peaking September to early November. Eggs are laid between May and September on Lord Howe Island, and early July to early January (peaking in September) on Phillip Island.

In the northern hemisphere, egg-laying on Kure Atoll can be any time from January to early July, peaking in February and March. On Clipperton Island, egg-laying peaks in November to coordinate with peak fish productivity of the surrounding waters in January (for growing chicks). Masked boobies lay at any time in the Caribbean, peaking between March and September.

The nest is a cleared area 0.75 to 1 m (2 ft 6 in to 3 ft 3 in) in diameter, within which is a clearly demarcated 25 to 30 cm (10 to 12 in) shallow (1–2 cm (0.4–0.8 in) deep) depression. A clutch of two chalky white eggs is laid, with an interval of five to eight days between the laying of each egg. Occasionally nests with three eggs are reported; these are probably due to an egg from another nest rolling downhill into the nest. The eggs have an average size of 64 mm × 45 mm (2.5 in × 1.8 in) and weigh 75 g (2.6 oz). They are incubated by both adults for 45 days. Parents incubate the eggs by resting on their tarsi and wrapping their webbed feet over the eggs, with the outermost toes resting on the ground. Their feet are more vascular at this time. When first hatched, the chicks are about 10 cm (3.9 in) long and weigh around 40–60 g (1.4–2.1 oz), with a sparse covering of white down over their grey to pinkish-grey skin. Altricial and nidicolous, their eyes are open at birth. Their down thickens as they age, and the chicks are quite fluffy by week 5–6. The primaries and rectrices appear by week 8, and scapulars appear by week 10. They begin losing their down from week 12 onwards, until they are wholly covered by juvenile plumage by week 15 or 16, and fledge at around 120 days (17 weeks) of age. After leaving the nest, young birds are dependent on their parents for 3–4 weeks before dispersing out to sea.

Although two eggs are often laid, the younger chick almost always perishes within a few days. This has been observed widely across the species' range. Dorward suspected siblicide on Ascension Island. Siblicide has been observed in the Nazca booby on the Galapagos Islands, and is assumed to occur in the masked booby as well.

=== Feeding ===
The masked booby is a spectacular diver, plunging vertically or near-vertically from heights of anywhere from 12 to 100 m (40 to 330 ft)—but more commonly 15 to 35 m (50 to 115 ft)—above the water into the ocean at high speed, to depths of up to 3 m (9.8 ft) in search of fish. It generally swallows its catch underwater. Fieldwork at Clipperton Island showed that masked boobies flew on average to 103 km (64 mi) from their colony, with a maximum range of 242 km (150 mi), while feeding their chicks. They did not rest at sea at night, though part of their return trip was at night time for longer expeditions. The masked booby forages with the white-bellied storm petrel (Fregetta grallaria) and Bulwer's petrel (Bulweria bulwerii) at times. Frigatebirds often harass the species until they disgorge their catch and steal their food.

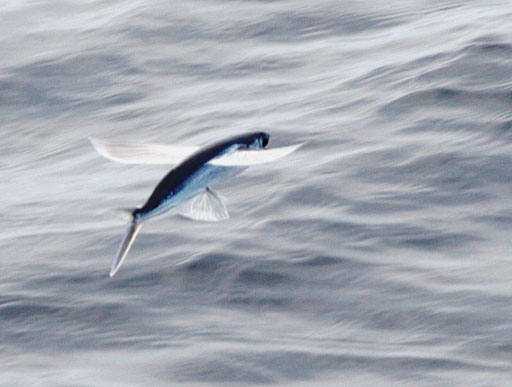
Flying fish, such as the Atlantic flyingfish, are a common prey item.

Fish, particularly flying fish, up to 28 cm (11 in) long (rarely up to 41 cm (16 in)) form the bulk of its diet, along with cephalopods. Species eaten include various species of flying fish such as blue flyingfish (Exocoetus volitans), mirrorwing flyingfish (Hirundichthys speculiger), sailfin flyingfish (Parexocoetus brachypterus), glider flyingfish (Cheilopogon atrisignis) and Atlantic flyingfish (Cheilopogon melanurus), other fish such as yellowtail amberjack (Seriola lalandi), skipjack tuna (Katsuwonus pelamis), mackerel scad (Decapterus macarellus), pompano dolphinfish (Coryphaena equiselis), mahi-mahi (Coryphaena hippurus), brown chub (Kyphosus bigibbus), redbarred hawkfish (Cirrhitops fasciatus), snake mackerel (Gempylus serpens), frigate tuna (Auxis thazard), Pacific saury (Cololabis saira), ribbon halfbeak (Euleptorhamphus viridis), flat needlefish (Ablennes hians) and mullet of the genus Mugil, and the purpleback flying squid (Sthenoteuthis oualaniensis).

== Predators and parasites ==
Silver gulls (Chroicocephalus novaehollandiae) and buff-banded rails (Gallirallus philippensis) prey on eggs and young. On some islands such as Ascension and Saint Helena, feral cats have been a threat to masked boobies. The tick species Ornithodoros (Alectorobius) muesebecki was described parasitising nesting blue-faced boobies off the Arabian coast. The argasid tick Ornithodoros capensis and the ixodid tick Amblyomma loculosum have also been recorded as parasites, the latter possibly spreading piroplasmosis caused by Babesia among boobies. On Raine Island and Pandora Cay, nests have been destroyed by green sea turtles (Chelonia mydas) as they pass through booby colonies and dig their own nests in large numbers. Rats prey on eggs and young of many seabirds, though the size of masked boobies probably prevents direct predation. Seabird colonies may experience indirect ecological consequences from the introduction of rats. Research on the ecosystems of the Aleutian Islands has demonstrated that invasive Norway rats modify food-web dynamics by decreasing seabird populations and altering the organization of coastal communities; the recovery of seabird populations and the surrounding marine ecosystems has been linked to the removal of rats. On Clipperton Island, rats prey on the crab that eats vegetation.

== Relationship with humans ==
The Taíno ate masked and red-footed boobies that nested on Grand Turk Island around 1000 years ago. The two species subsequently vanished from the Turks and Caicos Islands. A booby yielded around 1–2 kg (2–5 lb) of meat. European sailors in the area also caught and ate tame boobies. Masked booby young and eggs were eaten by the crew of HMS Supply on Lord Howe Island.

== Conservation status ==
The International Union for Conservation of Nature (IUCN) lists the masked booby as a species of least concern, though the population worldwide is decreasing.

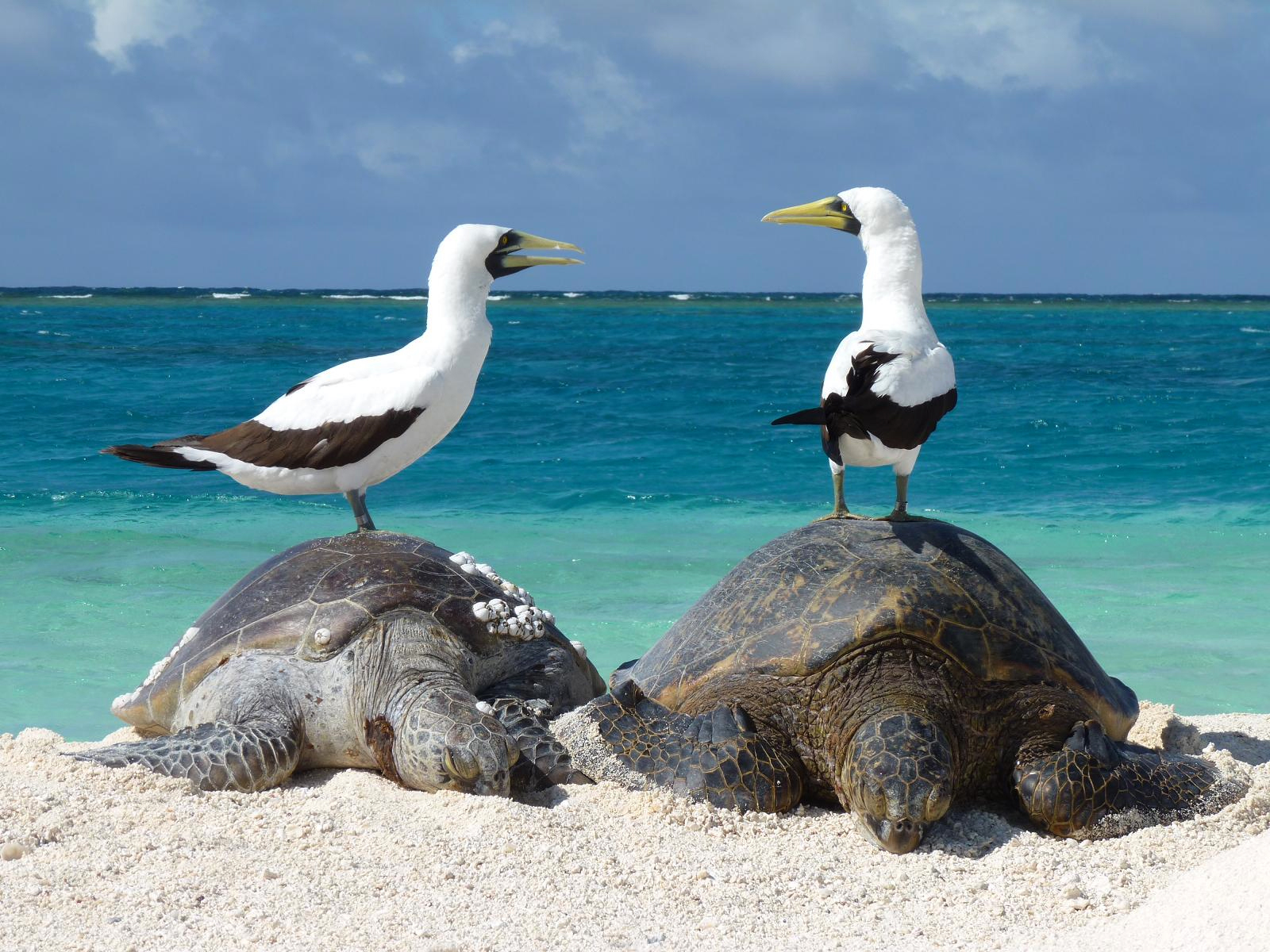
Masked boobies on top of basking green sea turtles, at the PMNM

At Clipperton Island, the colony was benefitted by the presence of yellowfin tuna (Thunnus albacares), which drove their prey item—flying fish—to the surface, facilitating predation by boobies. It may be that overfishing of tuna adversely impacts the availability of fish there. In 2005, 508 young masked boobies at the colony suffered from "angel wing", a congenital deformity of one or both wings resulting in flightlessness. This coincided with a season of high nestling mortality that was likely related to low numbers of yellowfin tuna due to possible overfishing at a crucial time in the breeding season. The warm phase (El Niño) of the El Niño–Southern Oscillation in 1982 and 1983 negatively impacted breeding on Christmas Island as the higher water temperatures reduced food supply. Where usually 1500 pairs nested, no young were observed over this period; 50–60 pairs were observed breeding in October 1983. The Australian government has rated both subspecies occurring in Australian waters as vulnerable to climate change. The low-lying colonies of subspecies personata are at risk from rising sea levels, and the rising sea temperatures are calculated to reduce food productivity, which may impact on breeding success of both subspecies.
