= Tadman =

Tadman is a surname. Notable people with the surname include:

- D. H. Tadman, British army officer
- George Tadman (1914–1994), British footballer
- Maurice Tadman (1921–1994), British footballer, brother of George

== See also ==
- Tasman (name)
- Tedman, another surname
- Tidman, another surname
- Todman (surname), another surname
- Tuđman (surname), another surname
