= Tedman =

Tedman is a surname. Notable people with the surname include:

- George Tedman (1885–1976), Australian politician
- Paul Tedman (born 1972), British Army commander of Space Command

== See also ==
- Tadman, another surname
- Tidman, another surname
- Todman (surname), another surname
- Tuđman (surname), another surname
