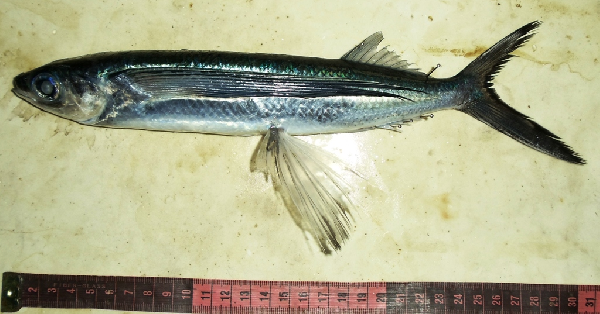
- Adult
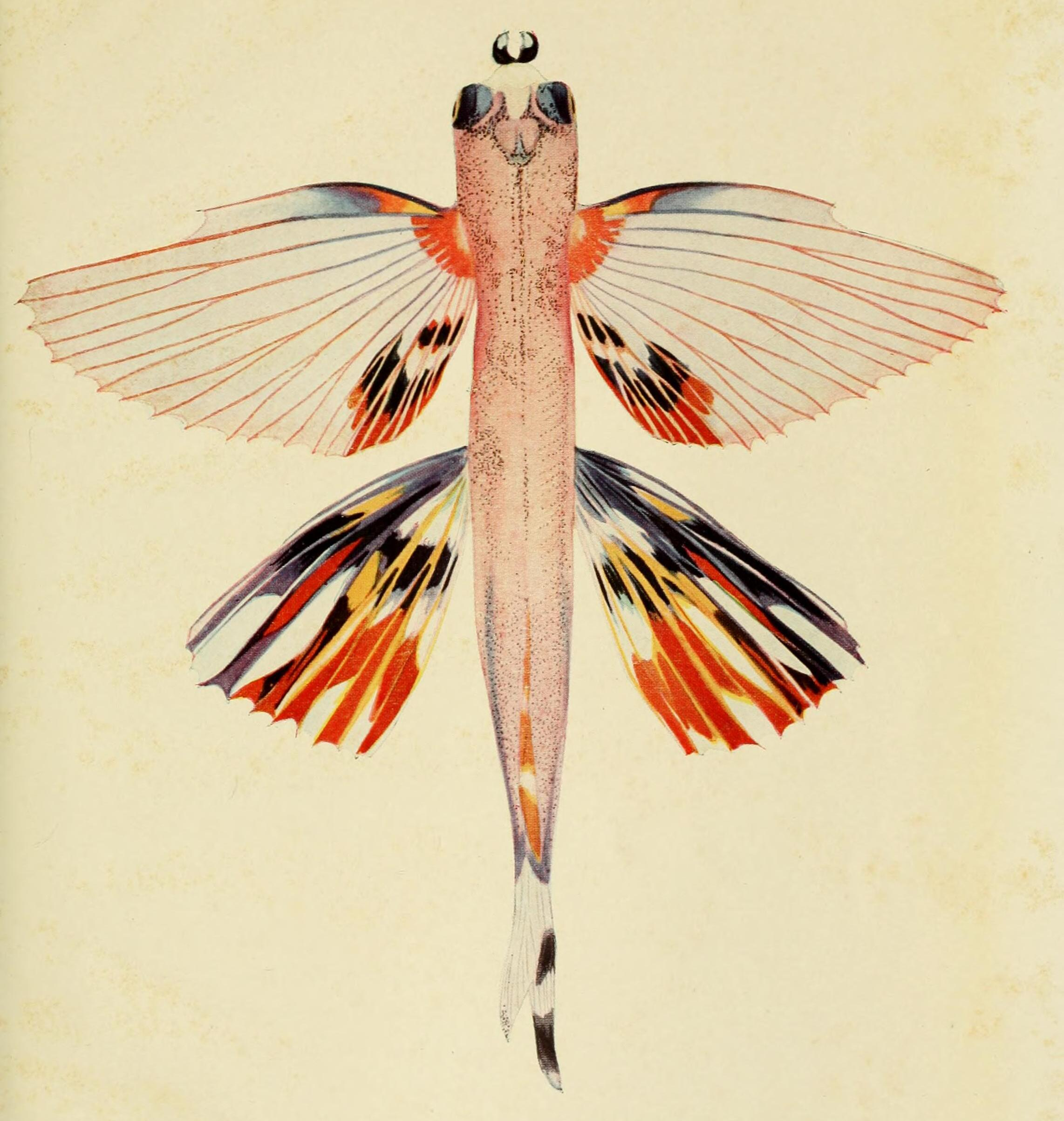
- Juvenile

Scientific classification
- Kingdom: Animalia
- Phylum: Chordata
- Class: Actinopterygii
- Division: Teleostei
- Order: Beloniformes
- Family: Exocoetidae
- Genus: Cheilopogon
- Species: C. furcatus

Binomial name
- Cheilopogon furcatus (Mitchill, 1815)

= Spotfin flyingfish =

Species of fish

The spotfin flyingfish (Cheilopogon furcatus) is a fish in the flying fish family, Exocoetidae.
