= Tidman =

Tidman is a surname. Notable people with the surname include:

- Annie Tidman (1956–2011), Scientology official
- Gordon Tidman (born 1932), Canadian lawyer, politician, and judge
- Ola Tidman (born 1979), Swedish footballer
- Oliver Tidman (1911–2000), English footballer

== See also ==
- Tadman, another surname
- Tedman, another surname
- Todman (surname), another surname
- Tuđman (surname), another surname
