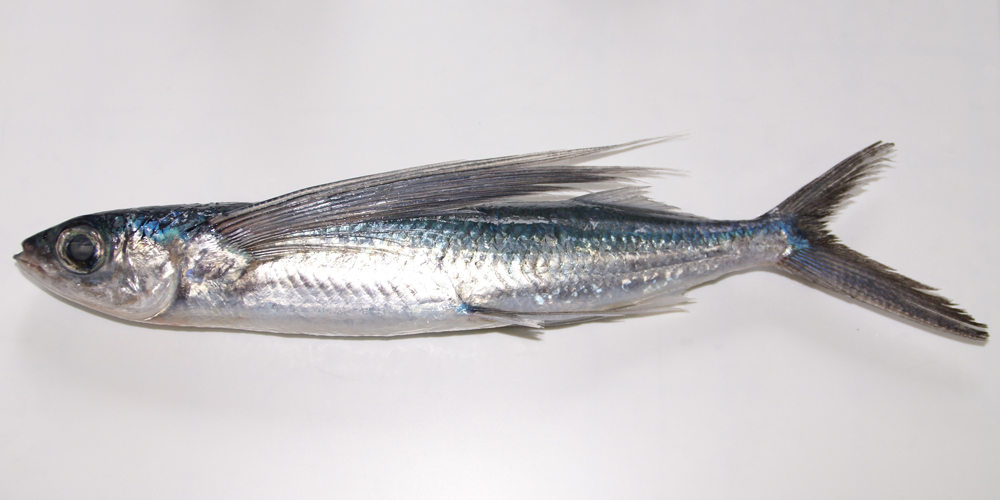
- C. pinnatibarbatus japonicus

Scientific classification
- Kingdom: Animalia
- Phylum: Chordata
- Class: Actinopterygii
- Order: Beloniformes
- Family: Exocoetidae
- Subfamily: Cypsellurinae
- Genus: Cheilopogon; Lowe, 1841

Type species
- Cypselurus pulchellus Lowe, 1841

Species
- See text.

= Cheilopogon =

Genus of fishes

Cheilopogon is a genus of flyingfishes. They are found worldwide except the Antarctic and Arctic oceans.

== Species ==
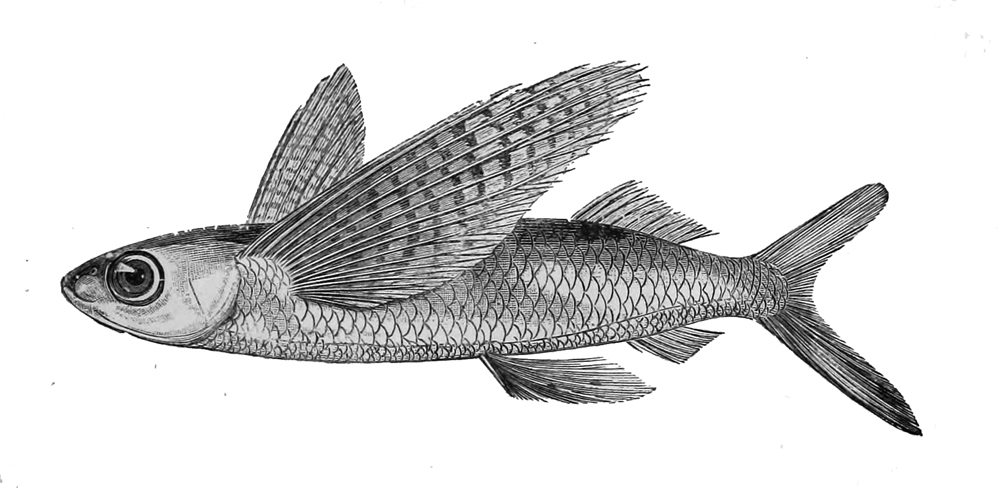
C. spilopterus

Currently, 29 species in this genus are recognized:

- Cheilopogon abei Parin, 1996 (Abe's flyingfish)
- Cheilopogon agoo (Temminck & Schlegel, 1846) (Japanese flyingfish)
- Cheilopogon altipennis (Valenciennes, 1847) (smallhead flyingfish)
- Cheilopogon arcticeps (Günther, 1866) (white-finned flyingfish)
- Cheilopogon atrisignis (O. P. Jenkins, 1903) (glider flyingfish)
- Cheilopogon cyanopterus (Valenciennes, 1847) (margined flyingfish)
- Cheilopogon doederleinii (Steindachner, 1887)
- Cheilopogon dorsomacula (Fowler, 1944) (backspot flyingfish)
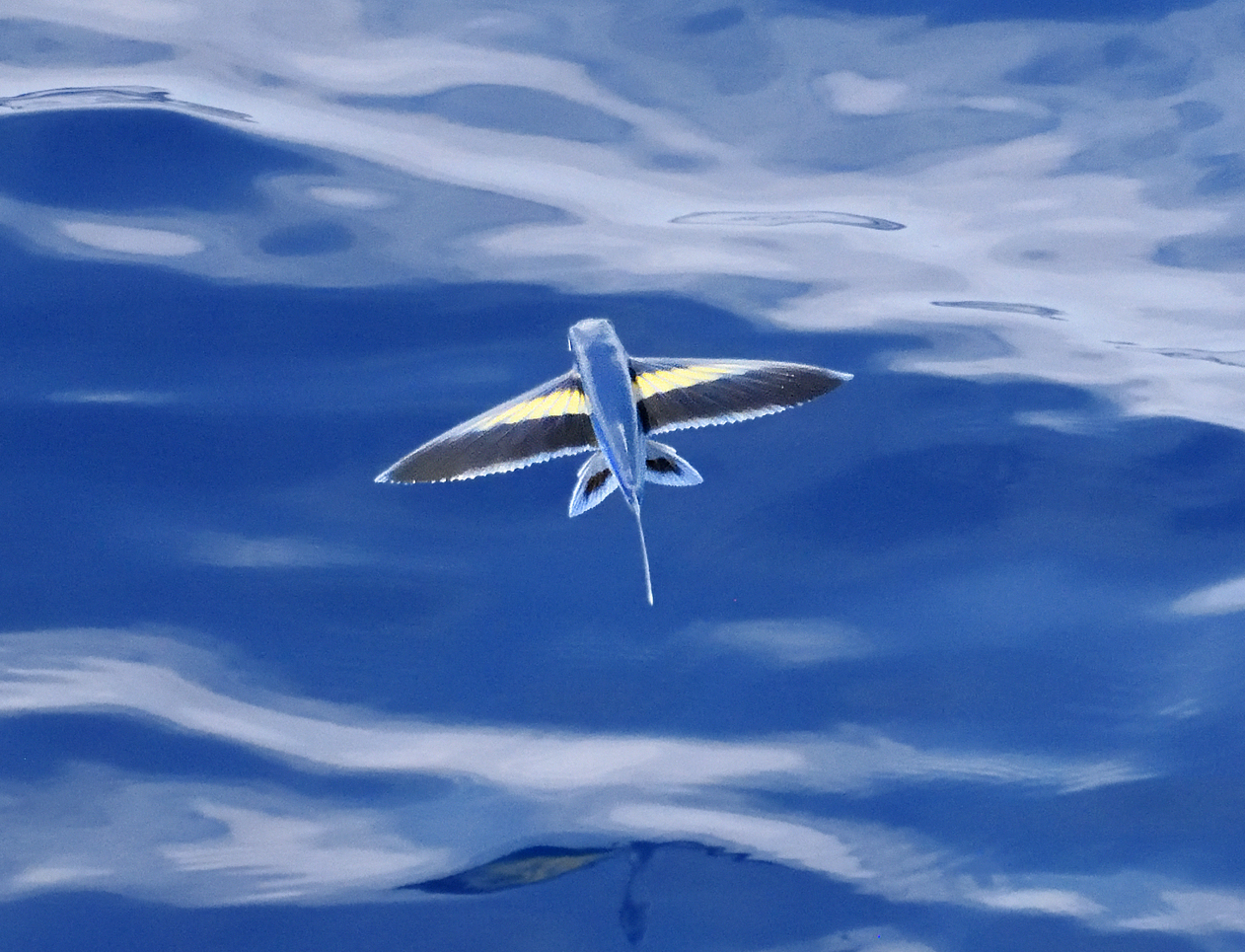
- C. abei
  Cheilopogon exsiliens (Linnaeus, 1771) (bandwing flyingfish)
- Cheilopogon furcatus (Mitchill, 1815) (spotfin flyingfish)
- Cheilopogon heterurus (Rafinesque, 1810) (Mediterranean flyingfish)
- Cheilopogon hubbsi (Parin, 1961) (blotchwing flyingfish)
- Cheilopogon intermedius Parin, 1961 (intermediate flyingfish)
- Cheilopogon katoptron (Bleeker, 1866) (Indonesian flyingfish)
- Cheilopogon melanurus (Valenciennes, 1847) (Atlantic flyingfish)
- Cheilopogon milleri (Gibbs & Staiger, 1970) (Guinean flyingfish)
- Cheilopogon nigricans (F. D. Bennett, 1840) (blacksail flyingfish)
- Cheilopogon olgae Parin, 2009
- Cheilopogon papilio (H. W. Clark, 1936) (butterfly flyingfish)
- Cheilopogon pinnatibarbatus (E. T. Bennett, 1831)
  - Cheilopogon pinnatibarbatus californicus (J. G. Cooper, 1863) (California flyingfish)
  - Cheilopogon pinnatibarbatus japonicus (V. Franz, 1910)
  - Cheilopogon pinnatibarbatus melanocercus (J. D. Ogilby, 1885) (Australasian flying fish)
  - Cheilopogon pinnatibarbatus pinnatibarbatus (E. T. Bennett, 1831) (Bennett's flyingfish)
- Cheilopogon pitcairnensis (Nichols & Breder, 1935)
- Cheilopogon rapanouiensis Parin, 1961 (Easter Island flyingfish)
- Cheilopogon spilonotopterus (Bleeker, 1866) (stained flyingfish)
- Cheilopogon spilopterus (Valenciennes, 1847) (manyspotted flyingfish)
- Cheilopogon suttoni (Whitley & Colefax, 1938) (Sutton's flyingfish)
- Cheilopogon unicolor (Valenciennes, 1847) (limpid-wing flyingfish)
- Cheilopogon ventralis (Nichols & Breder, 1935)
- Cheilopogon xenopterus (C. H. Gilbert, 1890) (whitetip flyingfish)
