= Todman (surname) =

Todman is a surname. Notable people with the surname include:

- Bill Todman (1916 – 1979), American game-show production executive
- Bill Todman, Jr. (born 1966), American son of William "Bill" Todman
- Charlene Todman (1931 – 2018), American athlete
- Jordan Todman (born 1990), American football player
- Mario Todman (born 1974), British Virgin Islands sprinter
- McWelling "Mac" Todman (1923 - 1996), British Virgin Islands runner in 1988 Summer Olympics)
- Terence Todman (1926 - 2014), U.S. diplomat, native of U.S. Virgin Islands
- Tonia Todman (born 1958), Australian television personality
- Willis Todman (born 1966), British Virgin Islands sprinter

== See also ==
- Tadman, another surname
- Tedman, another surname
- Tidman, another surname
- Tuđman (surname), another surname
