= Cheilopogon dorsomacula =

Scientific classification
- Kingdom: Animalia
- Phylum: Chordata
- Class: Actinopterygii
- Order: Beloniformes
- Family: Exocoetidae
- Genus: Cheilopogon
- Species: C. dorsomacula

Binomial name
- Cheilopogon dorsomacula (Fowler, 1944)

Species of Actinopterygii

Cheilopogon dorsomacula is a species of fish in the family Exocoetidae.
