= Tuđman (surname) =

Tuđman or Tudjman can refer to:

- Ankica Tuđman (1926–2022), wife of Franjo Tuđman and mother of Miroslav Tuđman
- Franjo Tuđman (1922–1999), Croatian politician, President of Croatia 1990–1999
- Miroslav Tuđman (1946–2021), Croatian scientist and politician

== See also ==
- Tadman, another surname
- Tedman, another surname
- Tidman, another surname
- Todman (surname), another surname
