= Cheilopogon papilio =

Conservation status
- Least Concern (IUCN 3.1)

Scientific classification
- Kingdom: Animalia
- Phylum: Chordata
- Class: Actinopterygii
- Order: Beloniformes
- Family: Exocoetidae
- Genus: Cheilopogon
- Species: C. papilio

Binomial name
- Cheilopogon papilio (Clark, 1936)

Synonyms
- Parexocoetus papilio Clark, 1936

Species of fish

Cheilopogon papilio, the butterfly flyingfish, is a species of ray-finned fish within the family Exocoetidae, distributed in the eastern Pacific off the coasts of Mexico in Baja California and the Revillagigedos Islands, as well as some areas off Costa Rica and Panama. Other common names of the species include the exocet papillon in French and volador mariposa in Spanish.

== Description ==
Cheilopogon papilio grows to a length of 21–22.2 cm (8.3–8.7 in). It has an elongated and cylindrical body covered in large smooth scales, with a blue-green back and silvery underbelly. Their lateral line is low on their body. They have a short head and short blunt snout, with a small mouth equipped with small teeth. The anal fin is transparent with 9 to 10 dorsal rays that originates under the third dorsal ray. The pectoral fins are black with clear narrow margins and tips. The caudal fin is deeply forked with a significantly larger lower lobe compared to the upper lobe. The pectoral fins are long and are set high on the body, and reach past the anal fin origin. The pelvic fins are originated far back on the body close to the caudal fin, also reaching past the anal fin origin. Juveniles have black dorsal fins, with two fused barbels under their chin.

== Habitat & ecology ==
Cheilopogon papilio lives in epipelagic coastal waters up to depths of 5 to 20 m (16 to 66 ft) below the ocean surface, feeding on planktonic organisms and small fish. Just like other members within its family, C. papilio uses its large pectoral fins to glide considerable distances when leaping out of the water to escape potential predators such as tuna, dolphins, mahi-mahi, marlin, squid, and porpoises. Reproduction is oviparus with the release of sticky filaments that attach themselves to floating and benthic weeds.

== Conservation ==
Cheilopogon papilio has been classified as a 'least concern' species by the IUCN Red List, as even though there is no population data on the species, its distribution overlaps with some Marine Protected Areas, paired with no known major threats that may effect the species. No specific conservation efforts towards the C. papilio have been made.
