= Maydh Island =

Island in Somaliland

- Location within Sanaag Location within Somaliland

Geography
- Location: Somaliland
- Coordinates: 11°13′17.2″N 47°14′24.6″E
- Length: 2 km (1.2 mi)
- Width: 0,3 km (1.9 mi)

Administration
- Somaliland

Demographics
- Ethnic groups: Uninhabited

Maydh Island, also known as Rabshi Island (Somali: Jasiirada Rabshi) is an island off the coast of Maydh, Somaliland. The island is located 13km off the shore of the town of the same name, Maydh. The island is less than 2km long and 300m wide, and serves as an important seasonal breeding site for several marine bird species. The island is accessible by boat.

== Description ==
The island's long axis is aligned with east-northeast to west-southwest. The island's southern face features rocky buttresses that alternate with gullies filled with scree, while its northern face is an uninterrupted precipice. The island has steep sides and rises abruptly out of the water. The surface of the granitic gneiss rock, which is covered in guano deposits, has large fissures in some places.

The island has no vegetation at all and receives only a meagre 50 mm of rain annually, which is the only source of fresh water. An area of seasonal coastal upwelling surrounds the island.

The island is home to marine bird species such as the Somali sooty tern as well as the S. d. melanops.
