= Trans-Tasman Cup (rugby league) =

Tournament information
- Sport: Rugby league
- Established: 1935
- Final year: 1995
- Administrators: Australian Rugby League; New Zealand Rugby League
- Participants: Australia; New Zealand

The Trans-Tasman Cup was a series of rugby league Test matches between the Australia and New Zealand national teams. It was replaced by the annual Anzac Test match in 1997.

== History ==
The first match between Australia and New Zealand took place in 1908, but regular meetings between the two sides didn't take place until the 1930s. The cup was donated by New Zealand businessman Roy Courtney, and was first contested in 1935, with Australia winning the series 2–1. New Zealand won the cup for the first time two years later. Australia regained the cup in 1956, and held the trophy for the remaining years it was contested (New Zealand managed to draw several series, but Australia retained the trophy as holders).

When the annual Anzac Test was introduced in 1997, a new trophy, the Bill Kelly Memorial Cup, was introduced to replace the Trans-Tasman Cup.

== Results ==
| Year | Winner | Result | Runners-up | Host country |
|---|---|---|---|---|
| 1935 | Australia | 2–1 | New Zealand | New Zealand |
| 1937 | New Zealand | 1–1 | Australia | New Zealand |
| 1948 | New Zealand | 1–1 | Australia | Australia |
| 1949 | New Zealand | 1–1 | Australia | New Zealand |
| 1952 | New Zealand | 2–1 | Australia | Australia |
| 1953 | New Zealand | 2–1 | Australia | New Zealand |
| 1956 | Australia | 3–0 | New Zealand | Australia |
| 1959 | Australia | 2–1 | New Zealand | Australia |
| 1961 | Australia | 1–1 | New Zealand | New Zealand |
| 1963 | Australia | 2–1 | New Zealand | Australia |
| 1965 | Australia | 1–1 | New Zealand | New Zealand |
| 1967 | Australia | 3–0 | New Zealand | Australia |
| 1969 | Australia | 1–1 | New Zealand | New Zealand |
| 1972 | Australia | 2–0 | New Zealand | Australia |
| 1978 | Australia | 3–0 | New Zealand | Australia |
| 1980 | Australia | 2–0 | New Zealand | Australia |
| 1982 | Australia | 2–0 | New Zealand | Australia |
| 1983 | Australia | 1–1 | New Zealand | Australia; New Zealand |
| 1985 | Australia | 2–1 | New Zealand | Australia; New Zealand |
| 1986 | Australia | 3–0 | New Zealand | Australia; New Zealand |
| 1989 | Australia | 3–0 | New Zealand | New Zealand |
| 1991 | Australia | 2–1 | New Zealand | Australia |
| 1993 | Australia | 2–0 | New Zealand | Australia; New Zealand |
| 1995 | Australia | 3–0 | New Zealand | Australia |
