= Tasman parakeet =

Tasman parakeet may refer to:

- Lord Howe red-crowned parakeet
- Norfolk Island green parrot
