= Marc Tasman =

American Intermedia artist (born 1971)

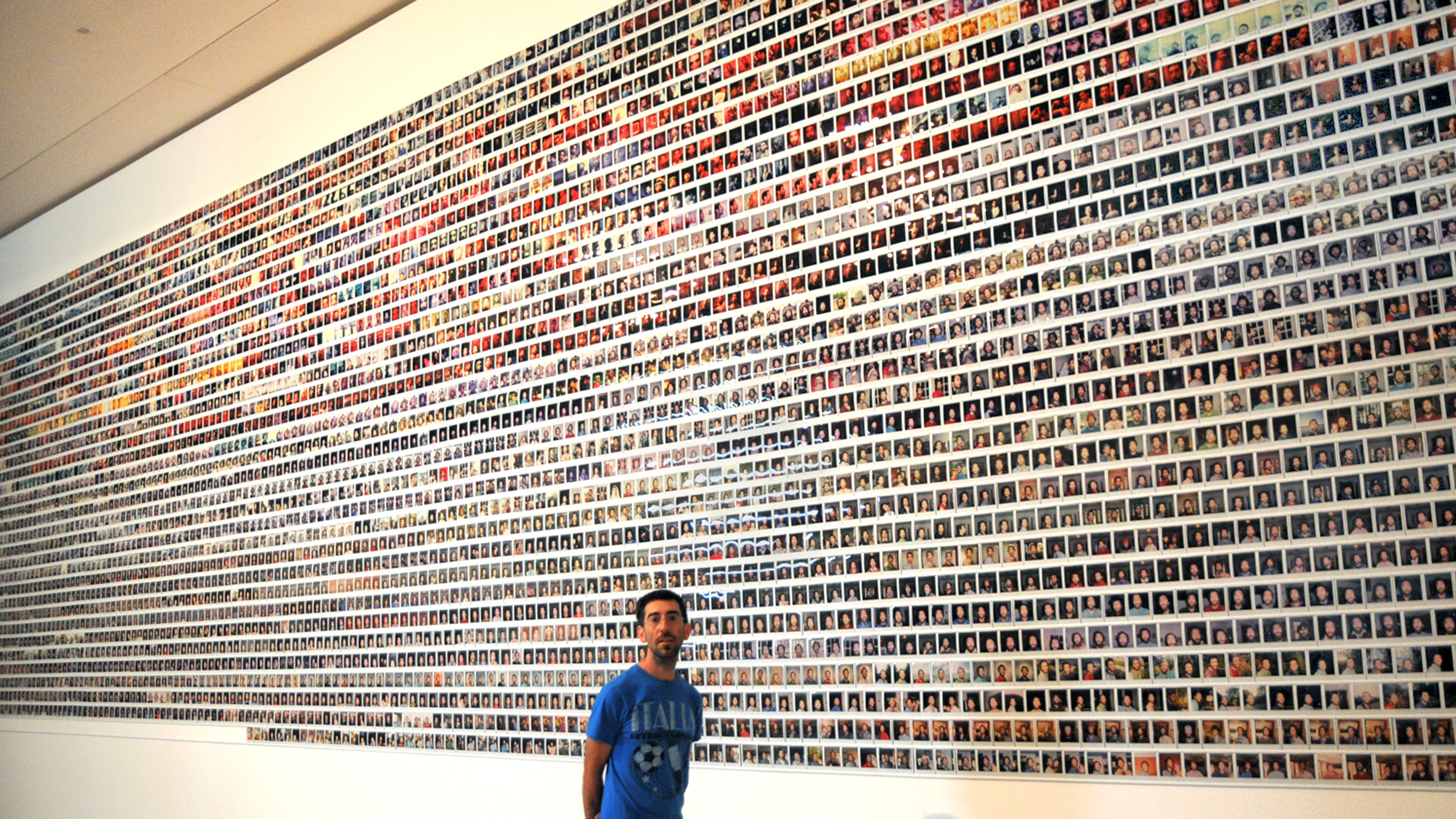
- Tasman in front of his installation of 10 years of daily Polaroid self-portraits at MMoCA
- Born: 1971 (age 50); Louisville, Kentucky
- Education: Università per Stranieri di Perugia, University of Louisville, Ohio State University
- Known for: photography
- Awards: Mary L. Nohl Fellowship for Individual Artists Award (2006)
- Website: http://marctasman.net/

Marc Tasman (born 1971) is an American Intermedia artist who works in a variety of media, including interactive art, performance art, video art, and photography. He is currently a Senior Lecturer at the University of Wisconsin–Milwaukee in the Department of Journalism, Advertising, and Media Studies.

== Early life and education ==
A native Louisvillian, Tasman demonstrated his interest and engagement with new media art, culture, and technology from a young age. In 1984, when Tasman was 12 years old he won a computer programming contest sponsored by the Louisville Free Public Library. Local news featured him in a story about a computer whiz. Tasman received his Bachelor of Fine Arts in Studio Art and Photography in 1995 from the Allen R. Hite Art Institute at the University of Louisville where he achieved the Winthrop Allen Award for outstanding graduating B.F.A. Candidate. In 2000 he received his Master of Fine Arts in Photography from Ohio State University in the Department of Art, also winning the competitive Edith Fergus Gilmore materials grant and scholarship in subsequent years. In 1992 Tasman earned a certificate in Italian language and Art history of the Italian Renaissance at the Università per Stranieri in Perugia, Italy.

== Work ==
Tasman's work often combines documentary photography with elements of performance art and public interventions.

=== Ten Year Polaroid Project ===
Tasman is most well known for his time-lapse photography piece completed in 2009. Here he made a Polaroid instant film self-portrait every day for ten years and one day—3,654 consecutive days beginning on July 24, 1999. He decided to continue this practice for 10 years because of the significance of a decade and the common practice in popular media of reflecting on the passing of decades. Tasman admits he chose Polaroid film for its ease of use and lack of photographic processing to attain an image. However, there were other challenges in creating the work, especially in archiving the material body of self-portraits, such as remembering to write the dates on the back, to make sure that stacks of photos were not knocked over or disarrayed, the cost of the film, and the expense of digitizing thousands of photographs. Tasman discussed with Mark Metcalf how the medium also seemed fitting to when dealing with conceptual issues of memory and storytelling. After concluding the ten years and one day period, and having digitally scanned the images, Tasman created a video from all of these Polaroids. Dick Gordon, host of the radio program, The Story with Dick Gordon, on American Public Media suggested that Tasman's project that began in 1999, illuminates the dramatic transformation that imaging technology and it social uses have undergone. "The funny thing is that the idea of a widely shared YouTube video was something that Marc could not even have conceived of—the technology wasn't there."

Art and architecture critic Mary Louise Schumacher for the Milwaukee Journal-Sentinel wrote that Tasman's choice of the medium of Polaroid, "seems eerily prescient," amidst the ubiquity of digital self-portraiture involved with social media, given that Polaroid stopped manufacturing film in 2009. In her review of the 2010 Wisconsin Triennial at the Madison Museum of Contemporary Art, the museum's twelfth survey of artists living and working in the state, where Tasman created a 40 foot wide by 16 foot high installation of nearly 5000 Polaroids, Schumacher described a "striking poignancy" that this work takes on when she learned that Tasman's maternal great-grandparents were killed during World War II and that no photographs of them survived. "Is he searching for the faces of lost relatives in the wall-filling installation of himself? Is the sheer endurance of his project a statement of survival?" Art critic Katie Vaughn wrote that "one feels almost stunned thinking about the time commitment involved in such a project—and a similar feeling is evoked seeing the photographs en masse." Independent curator Joan Backes suggests that Tasman's piece "represents a kind of dedication necessary for all artists, which is also a most distinguishing and inspiring characteristic of this work." This work is also featured in and on the cover of the book Reframing Photography: Theory and Practice, published in 2010 by Routledge.

=== Video Vigilante: Who Is Stealing My Signs? ===
Tasman's interventionist projects are frequently playful and political. After having several political yard signs stolen in the late summer of 2004, Tasman covered his remaining sign with oil and thorns, devised a crude motion sensitive sonic alarm, set up an infrared camcorder at his front door and recorded the nighttime scene. Tasman constructed a website, as this was before the advent of YouTube, where he posted the video clips of "the would-be thieves and their often humorous reactions" to being caught in the booby trap. As the trap proved to be a successful deterrent, local television and radio news broadcasts dubbed him the Video Vigilante. In 2007, his video which compiled eight failed attempts to steal the signs, "Who is Stealing My Signs?" was selected for the Ann Arbor Film Festival's competition program.

=== Proposal for A New American Flag ===
In 2006 Tasman was awarded a Mary Nohl Fellowship, and for the subsequent year's show at the Institute of Visual Arts (Inova) at the University of Wisconsin-Milwaukee (Fall 2007) he produced exhibition called, "Proposal for A New American Flag: Representing a new constellation." Tasman's didactic exhibition which included videos, posters, maps, letters to government officials, and hundreds of the new American flags ranging in scale from 4 inches (which were free to the public) to 9 feet, traveled in Wisconsin to Fond du Lac where it was on view through the Spring of 2008 at the UW-Visual Art Gallery.

Tasman proposed redesigning the American flag by increasing the constellation of stars from 50 to 99, 9 rows up and 11 rows across, a symbolic representation of 9/11, the September 11 attacks. The 19 stripes of the flag, or 9 plus 10, represent the pre-attack naivete of September the tenth.

Art critic Aisha Motlani wrote that Tasman's was "the most thought-provoking piece" in the Milwaukee group show and that his "video montage of 99 flags hoisted above commercial institutions throughout the city against the sonic backdrop of vehicular and human traffic (an interesting alternative to the national anthem) offers commentary not just on the pervasive spread of consumerism under the tenets of a national identity, but also on the way the American flag has become somewhat denigrated to the level of a common and faded prop."

Essayist Sarah Kanouse wrote in the show's catalog that Tasman's new flag "makes visible in iconic form the beliefs that justify profound changes in far more significant pillars of our democracy: those civil liberties established in the bill of rights and human rights standards set by international law...Tasman offers it as an opportunity to reconsider the complex relationship between the nation, its symbols, and its future."

=== Chocolate Messiah ===
Originating in 1999, the Chocolate Messiah, Choc Latai Tzvi, or Choco for short, is both a character based performance art piece and net art that interweaves public spectacle with altered news images that reflect upon Orientalism by implicating the phenomenon of media bias seen in images used to illustrate news stories about conflict in the Middle East or Eastern world. The Chocolate Messiah was inspired by Shabbetai Tzvi, a 17th-century Jewish mystic who declared himself the messiah, gained thousands of followers, was arrested in Constantinople, and converted to Islam to escape death. While the public performances are both absurd in nature as Tasman's character strips down to red briefs, has women pour melted chocolate on him, and hands out Hershey's Kisses, witnesses call the act, "highly spiritual."

In a characteristic photomontage on the Chocolate Messiah's web site, "he stands beatifically amidst Buddhist monks, while dripping with blood-like chocolate syrup. 'Choco is Coming,' is written prophetically across the sky in clouds." Other images show a chocolate covered Choco lying face down in a bed belonging to a shocked and aghast looking Yasir Arafat.

Vincent Brook was struck, at a 2004 conference where Tasman presented a paper on the Chocolate Messiah work, by the lack of reference in general to the Israeli–Palestinian conflict, noting that "this was all the artist-panelists wanted to talk about afterward, and with a level of passion that highlighted how much the conflict meant to them, and how deeply it disturbed them--too deeply, perhaps to allow it to enter their work.

The character Choco, however, in these "Chocolo-Spiritual Exercise" performances, expresses hopes that '"simple acts of giving chocolate, symbolic gestures of love and kindness, will inspire all humanity to love one another and live in peace."

=== Documentary photography ===
As a documentary photographer Tasman's work became noteworthy as part of the media coverage of the 2011 Wisconsin protests and the ensuing recall elections of various elected officials in the state. Mainstream and alternative publications in the U.S. used Tasman's Creative Commons licensed images and videos including The Huffington Post, Mother Jones, The Drudge Report, BuzzFeed, and Clarion to illustrate articles about this series of demonstrations and political actions in Wisconsin. Matt Stopera in an article for BuzzFeed compiling photographs of "The 100 Best Protest Signs At The Wisconsin Capitol," included Tasman's images from the February 16, 2011, ranking the image "Protesters at the end of the day," number two on this list.

Michael Shaw, writing for Bag News and The Huffington Post used Tasman's photo, "Firefighters led the protest into the State Capitol" to corroborate claims that images taken from archival video footage of protests in February 2011 in Madison, Wisconsin, used in a 2012 Super Bowl commercial, Halftime in America were digitally manipulated to remove the pro-union, pro-public education messages on the picket signs.
