= Tasman (name) =

Tasman is a rare family name in the diaspora of Dutch people. The distribution of people with the surname varies from about 6000 in Indonesia to small numbers in Australia and New Zealand, while by 2007 only seven people with the name lived in the Netherlands. The most notable bearer of this name was the Dutch explorer Abel Tasman.

== Origin ==
Cornelis Gerritsz Tasman of Schellinkhout was an early 17th century skipper on the 140-ton ship De Tas, literally "the bag". At the time it was common for ship captains to adopt the name of their ships. The family Tas or Tasman - not related to Abel Janszoon Tasman, who came from Lutjegast in Groningen - counted so many seamen in the late 1600s that their ships were divided in color: De Zwarte Tas ("black bag") of Jan Tasman, De Groene Tas ("green bag") of Pieter Janszoon Tasman, De Roode Tas ("red bag") of Pieter Corneliszoon Tasman and De Witte Tas (white bag) of Wigger Tasman.

== People ==
People with the name include:

=== Surname ===
- Abel Tasman (1603–1659), Dutch explorer
- Marc Tasman (born 1971), American multimedia artist
- William Tasman (1929–2017), American ophthalmologist

=== Given name ===
- Raymond Tasman Donoghue (1920–1960), Australian tram driver
- Lindsay Tasman Ride (1898–1977), Australian physiologist, soldier and Vice Chancellor of the University of Hong Kong
- Tasman Drake (1884–1946), New Zealand Anglican clergyman and cricketer
- Tasman Forth (1885–1964), Australian Odinist
- Tasman Heyes (1896–1980), Australian public servant
- Tasman Higgins (1888–1953), Australian cinematographer
- Tasman Keith, Australian rapper
- Tasman Knight (1906–1987), Australian rules footballer
- Tasman Long (1875–1926), Australian cricketer
- Tasman Joseph McKee (1911–1973), New Zealand chemist and geologist
- Tasman Roberts (1901–1942), Australian rules footballer
- Tasman Shields (1872–1950), Australian politician
