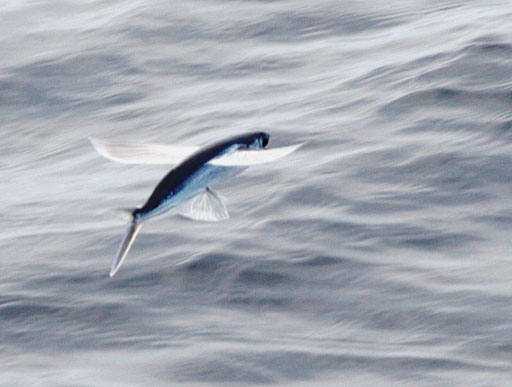
- In flight
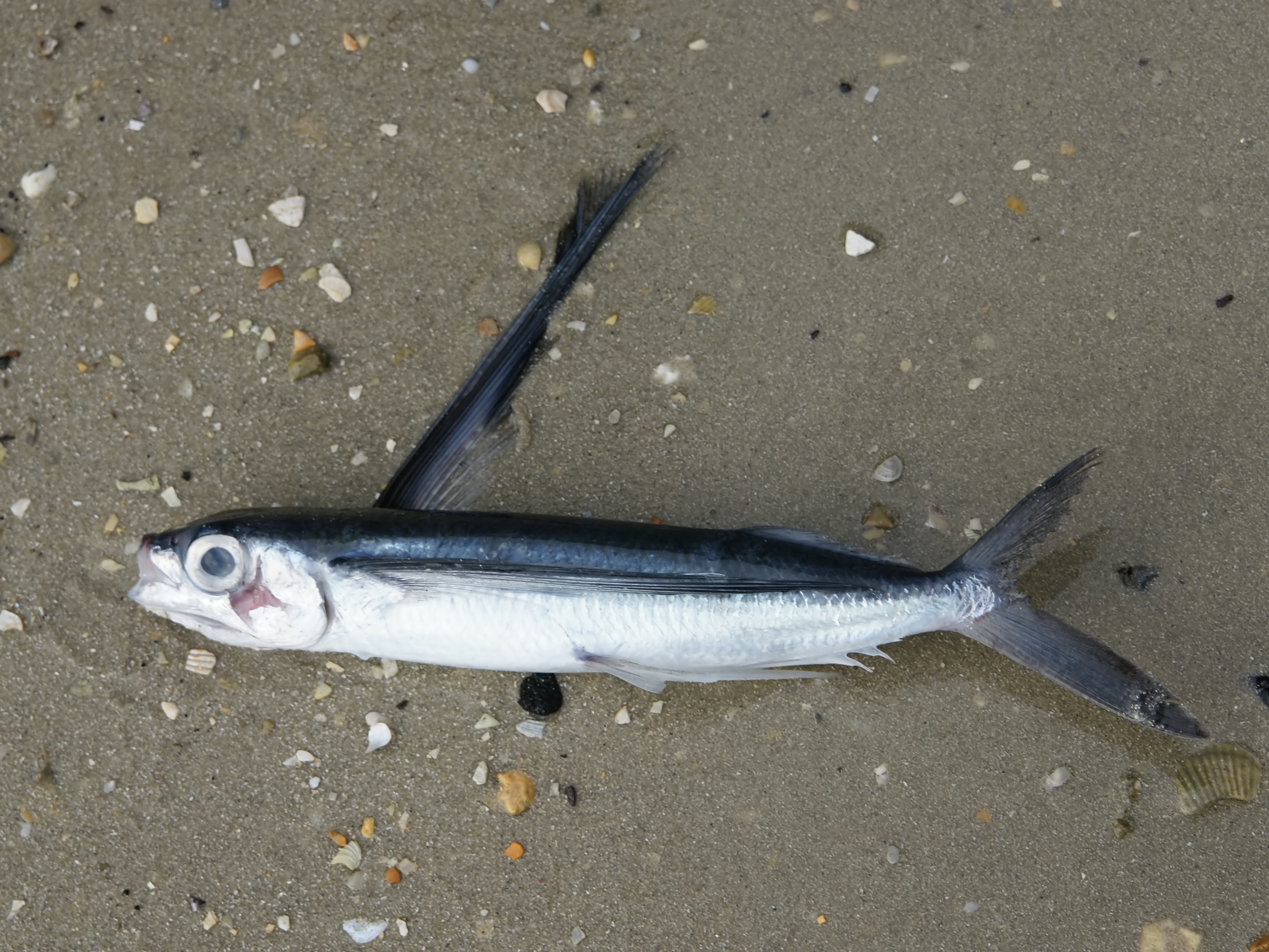
- Beached specimen; Fort Pierce, Florida

Conservation status
- Least Concern (IUCN 3.1)

Scientific classification
- Kingdom: Animalia
- Phylum: Chordata
- Class: Actinopterygii
- Order: Beloniformes
- Family: Exocoetidae
- Genus: Cheilopogon
- Species: C. melanurus

Binomial name
- Cheilopogon melanurus Valenciennes, 1847

Synonyms
- List: * Cypselurus melanurus Valenciennes, 1847; Exocoetus melanurus Valenciennes, 1847; Exocoetus lutkeni Jordan & Evermann, 1896; Cypselurus lutkeni (Jordan & Evermann, 1896)

= Atlantic flyingfish =

Species of fish

The Atlantic flyingfish (Cheilopogon melanurus) is a flying fish of the family Exocoetidae; the species is one of 6 in the genus Cheilopogon. It was first described by the French zoologist Achille Valenciennes in a 22-volume work entitled Histoire naturelle des poissons (Natural History of Fish), which was written in collaboration with fellow zoologist Georges Cuvier.

== Species description ==
C. melanurus is a four-winged species with two large wings at the front of its body and two smaller wings behind them. Atlantic flyingfish tend to reach around 26.5 cm (10.4 in), but the standard length for measurement is 226 millimeters. The longest recorded individual was 32 cm (13 in), although this length is highly uncommon.

Like many other flyingfishes, the Atlantic flyingfish has a cylindrical body, large tail, and pectoral fins that it uses for flight. Atlantic flyingfish have generally green to blue coloration dorsally, and white or silver ventrally. They have a sharp, small snout that is shorter than the length of its eye and a small, slanted mouth. They also have a dark dorsal fin, a transparent anal fin, and a darkly colored caudal fin.

=== Distinguishing traits ===
Although present in some species of Cheilopogon, palatine teeth are absent in C. melanurus. Moreover, the chin barbels of the Atlantic flyingfish are short in relation to other fish of the same genus. Unlike other flyingfish genera, C. melanurus can be differentiated by its long pectoral fin, primarily black dorsal fin, and ventral fins that barely reach or do not fully reach the start of the anal fin.

The Atlantic flyingfish can be easily mistaken for the congeneric Mediterranean flyingfish, Cheilopogon heterurus, as they closely resemble one another and have comparable features. Meristic traits such as the number of vertebrae is often used to distinguish between the two species because the Atlantic flyingfish has fewer vertebrae than the Mediterranean flyingfish, though as their meristic ranges overlap, these two species are divided by sea surface temperature preferences: they are separated into tropical (C. melanurus) and subtropical species (C. heterurus).

=== Juvenile traits ===
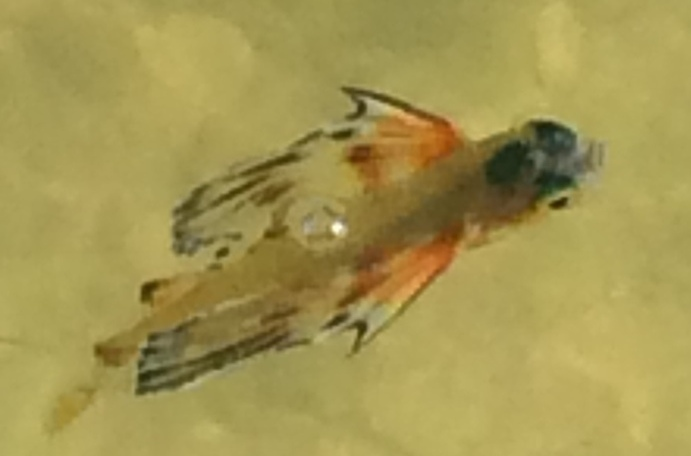
Juvenile

Their juvenile appearance differs from adult Atlantic flyingfish. The dorsal fins of juveniles are often unevenly pigmented, and they tend to have short mandibular barbels on their chins which are sensory organs used to sense their surroundings. Young Atlantic flyingfish up to 15 cm (5.9 in) can have transparent pectorals and often swim in harbors or bays.^{:124} The pectoral fin rays of juveniles are short in comparison to adults. At the time of hatching, Atlantic flyingfish are only 4 mm (0.16 in) in length and sexual maturity is not reached until around 200 mm (7.9 in) in length.

== Distribution and habitat ==
As its name suggests, the Atlantic flyingfish is only found in the pelagic to neritic zones of the Atlantic Ocean. Atlantic flyingfish live in surface waters near shore, where they are preyed upon by several species of larger fishes and seabirds, such as the wahoo and Sooty tern..

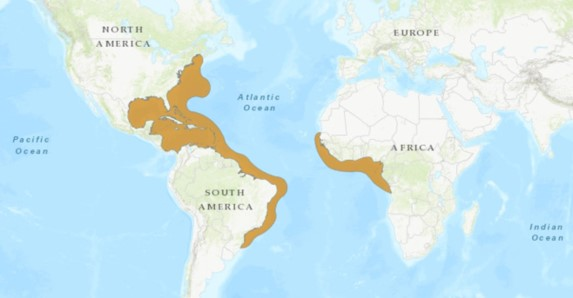
Photo Copyright IUCN, Global geographic range of the Atlantic flyingfish

Atlantic flyingfish rarely occur outside of these coastal waters and show a strong preference for shallow areas. Consistently, C. melanurus tends to live in warm tropical waters and generally do not go further than about 640 km (400 mi) away from the shoreline.

In the western Atlantic, they are known to live in Gulf Stream waters from Massachusetts south to Brazil. They are found in the Caribbean Sea and around the Antilles, while in the north, they are found off the coast of Canada. Off Africa, Atlantic flyingfish are known from Senegal to Liberia and have been reported from São Tomé and Príncipe. They are especially abundant off the coast of North Carolina and other nearby regions of the Atlantic Ocean.

== Biology ==
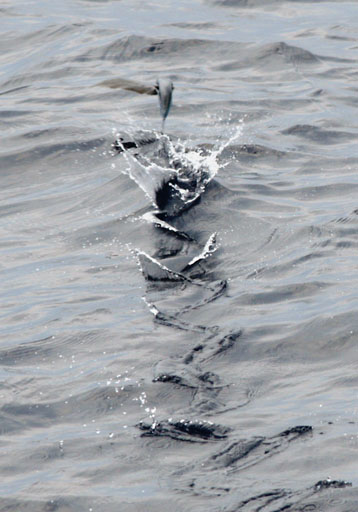
A distinctive pattern in the water, made by the beating of their tails, is made when the fish takes off

=== Locomotion ===
When flying, a distinctive pattern in the water can be made by beating its tail. To fly, the Atlantic flyingfish jumps out of the water, uses its pectoral fins to catch air currents and provide lift, and beats its tail back and forth to provide thrust. After reaching a speed of 30 km (19 mi) per hour,^{:124} Atlantic flyingfish can jump out of the water and glide about 3 to 12 m (9.8 to 39.4 ft).^{:32} This is presumably done to avoid ocean-going predators.

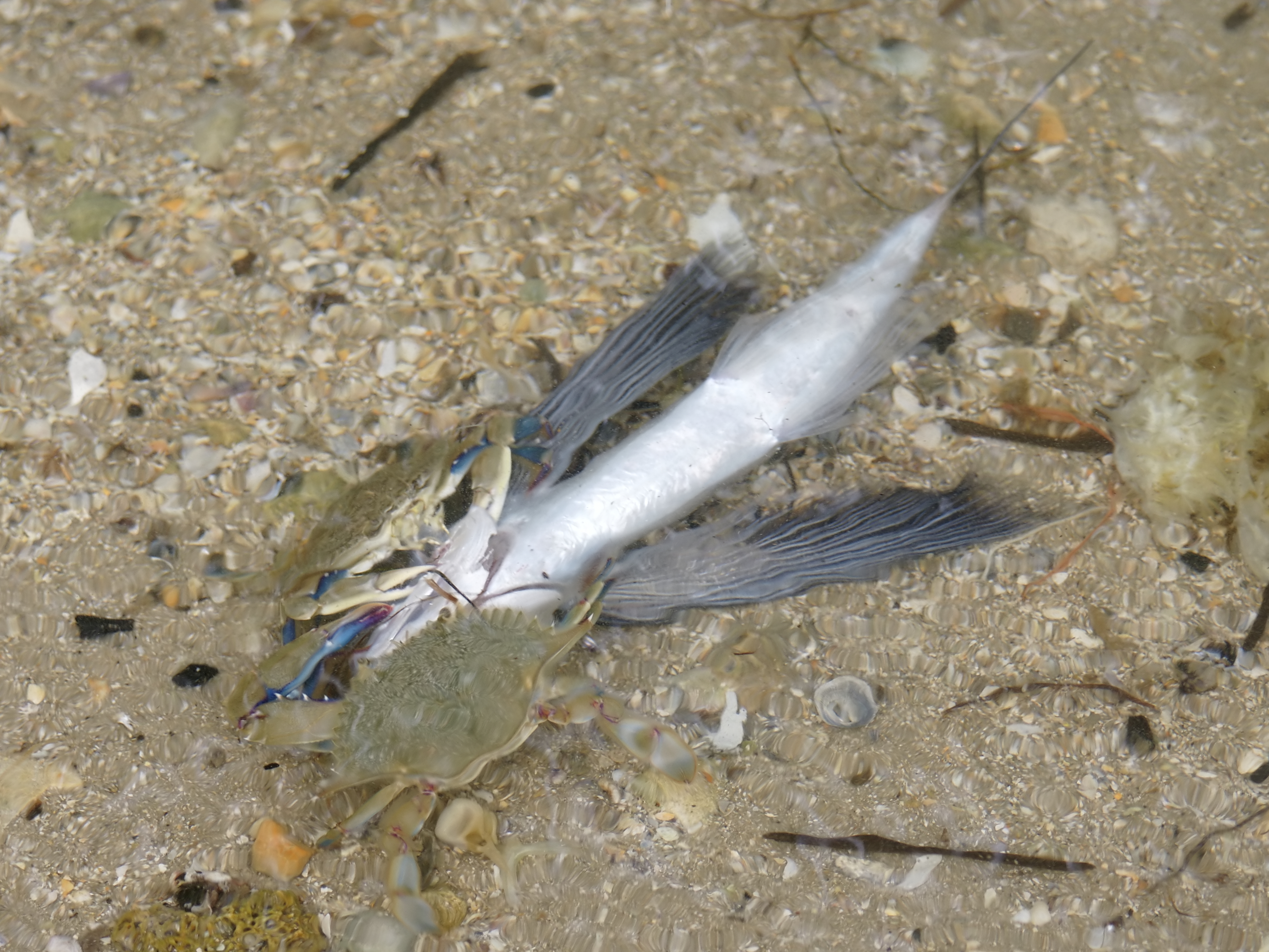
Beached flying fish being eaten by Atlantic blue crabs (Fort Pierce)

=== Diet ===
The Atlantic flyingfish primarily consumes zooplankton using its gill rakers and surface feeding techniques. Their diet is highly linked to their epipelagic habitat preference, as plankton can be found in shallow or top layers of water. However, the gills of the Atlantic flyingfish, which are vital for effective feeding, can be subject to parasites such as parasitic flatworms of the suborder Gastrocotylinae.

=== Reproduction ===
The spawning season of the Atlantic flyingfish is believed to be from June to August throughout the summer, although there have been documented gravid females as early as March. During spawning, Atlantic flyingfish tend to mate in large groups near the surface of the water.

When females are ready to deposit eggs, they do so on floating substrates in the water. C. melanurus eggs have filaments that support the attachment to other eggs or vegetation in the water. Often, larger females will release a greater number of eggs during reproduction. Ripe eggs are up to 1.8 to 1.9 millimeters in diameter and the filaments cover the full surface of the egg at this size.

== Conservation status and economic importance ==
In regions such as the Gulf of Guinea, the Atlantic flyingfish provides high economic value for artisanal fleet fishing. In a study by Zacarias et al. in São Tomé and Príncipe, researchers found C. melanurus to be the most important small-scale fishing catch with the highest occurrence rate in comparison to eight other local species. However, this paper also draws in concern for the fishing market of C. melanurus, stating that in comparison to previous studies, the number of small-scale-caught fish has reduced which may cause a threat to food security across the country. Research also indicates that C. melanurus is often highly targeted by Liberian fishermen due to their pelagic nature, making them an accessible resource to locals. In terms of the United States, the Atlantic flyingfish is minimally researched off the southeastern coast due to its low economic influence and minimal use for this area.

According to the International Union for Conservation of Nature (IUCN), the Atlantic flyingfish is of least concern in terms of its conservation concern. This species is very well-distributed and remains abundant in the areas it inhabits. The population trend is unknown, and the scope of its assessment was global. However, the date of its last assessment by the IUCN was January 2013 meaning it should be reassessed within the next couple years.
