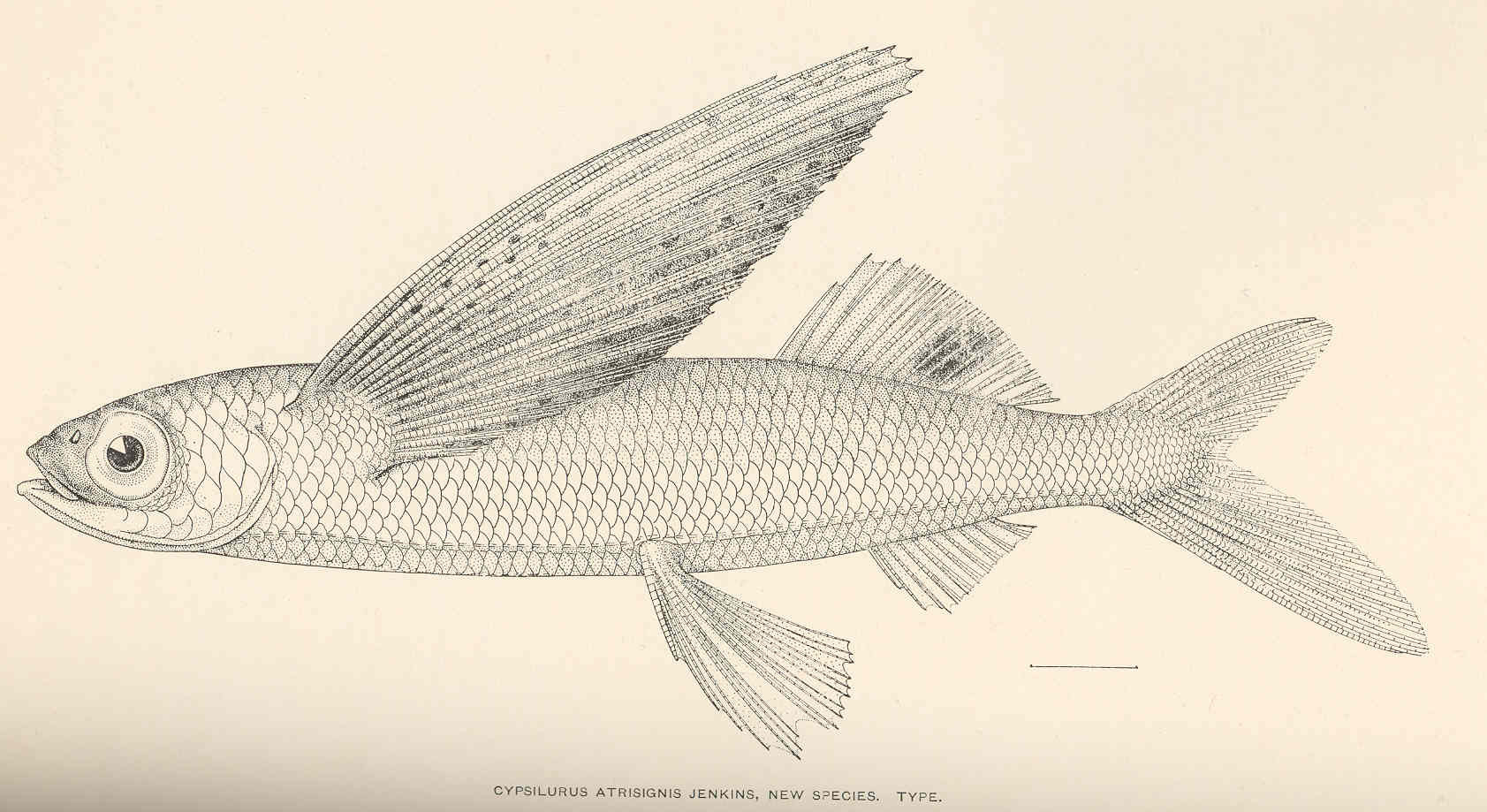

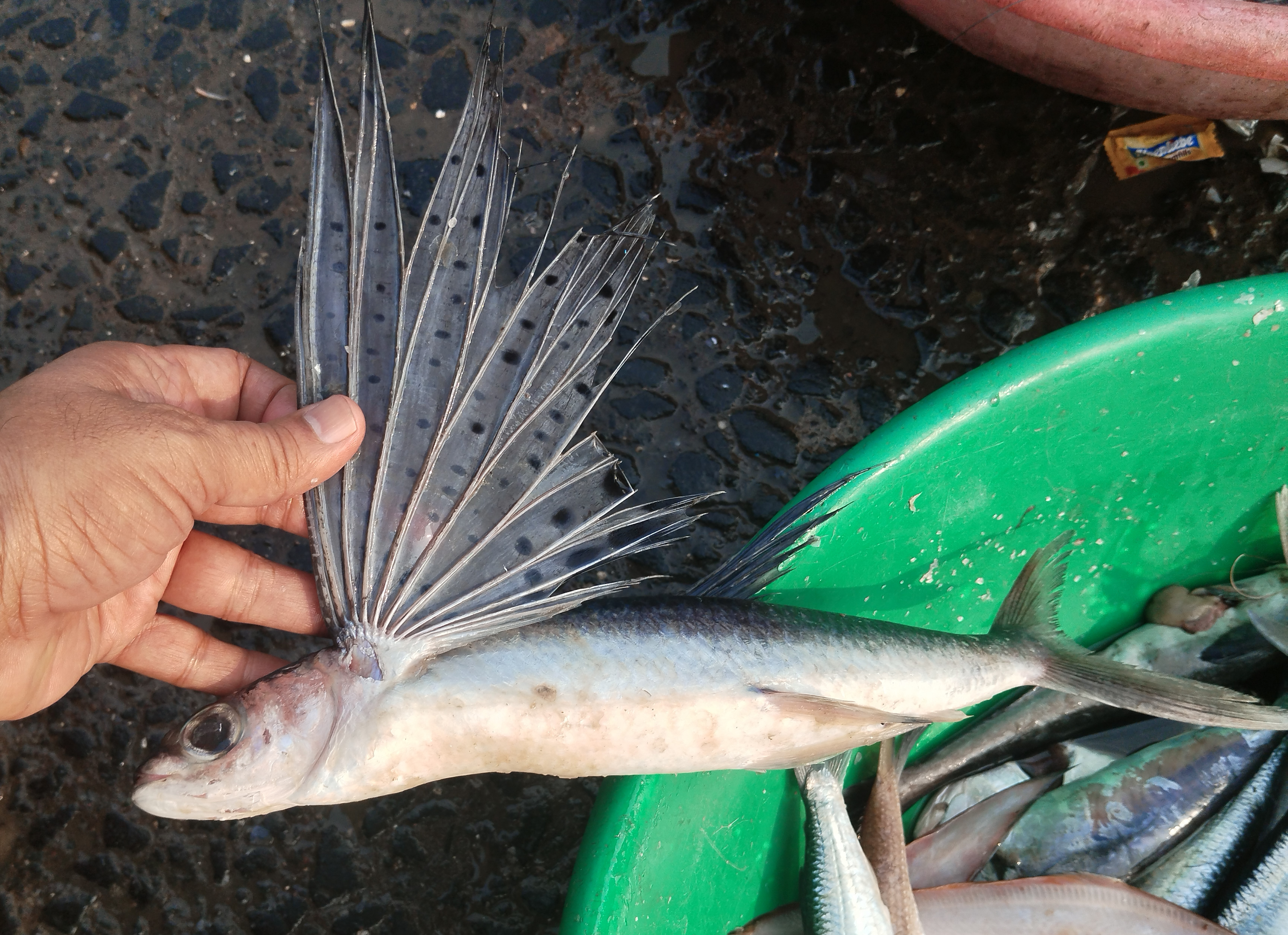

Scientific classification
- Domain: Eukaryota
- Kingdom: Animalia
- Phylum: Chordata
- Class: Actinopterygii
- Order: Beloniformes
- Family: Exocoetidae
- Genus: Cheilopogon
- Species: C. atrisignis

Binomial name
- Cheilopogon atrisignis (Jenkins, 1903)

Synonyms
- Cypselurus atrisignis subsp. atrisignis Jenkins, 1903; Cypselurus gregoryi Pietschmann, 1928; Cypselurus multimaculatus Kotthaus, 1969; Cypsilurus atrisignis Jenkins, 1903; Cypsilurus atrisignis subsp. galapagensis Fowler, 1944

= Cheilopogon atrisignis =

Species of Actinopterygii

Cheilopogon atrisignis is a species of fish in the family Exocoetidae, first described in 1903 by Oliver Peebles Jenkins as Cypselurus atrisignis.

It is a tropical, pelagic flying fish, found at depths of 0 – 10 m, able to leap from the water and glide considerable distances.

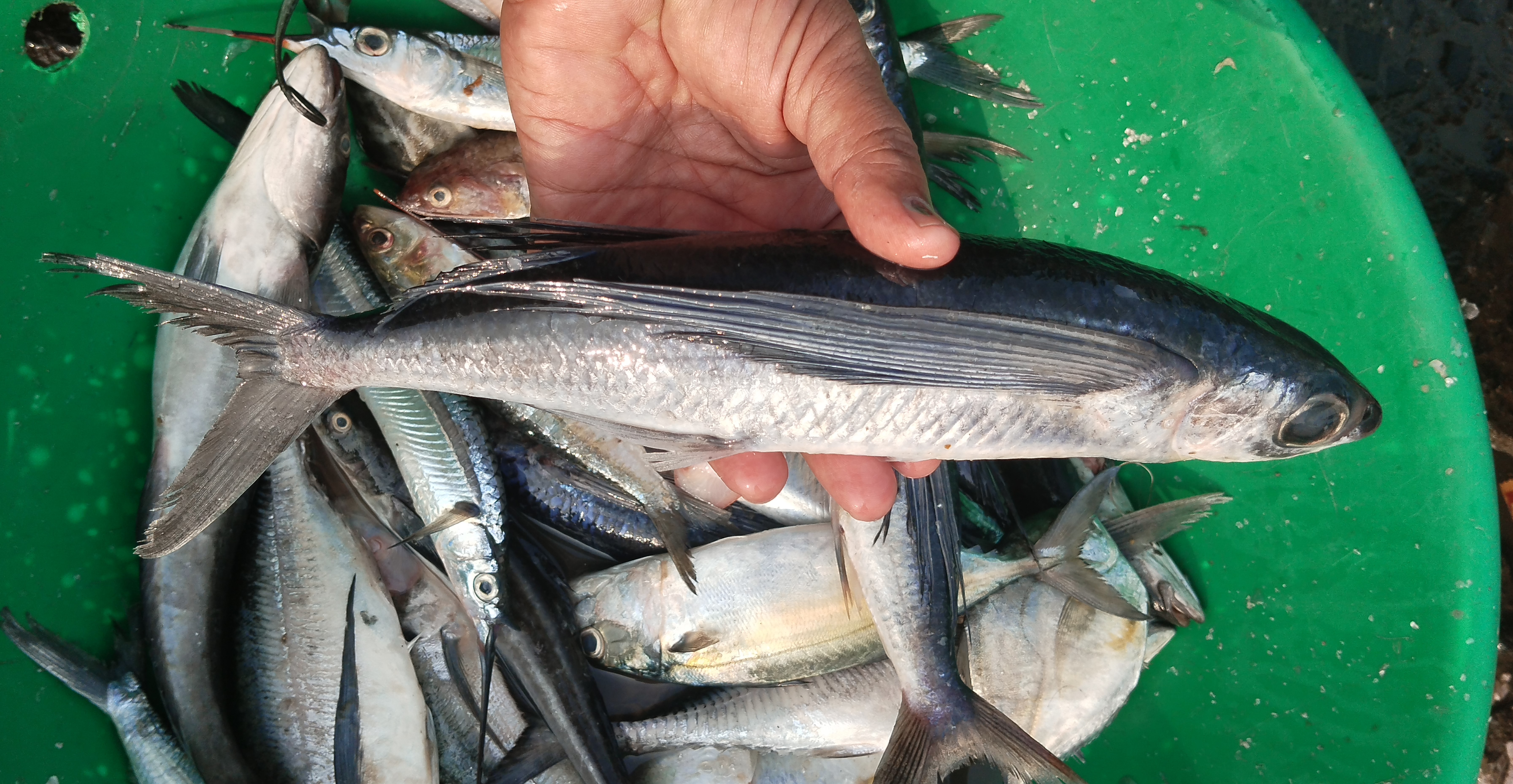
At market, Mumbai, Maharashtra
