= List of birds of Japan =

This is a list of the bird species recorded in Japan. The avifauna of Japan include a total of 731 species, of which 19 are endemic, and 31 have been introduced by humans.

This list's taxonomic treatment (designation and sequence of orders, families and species) and nomenclature (common and scientific names) follow the conventions of The Clements Checklist of Birds of the World, 2022 edition.

The following tags highlight several categories of occurrence other than regular migrants and non-endemic residents.

- (A) Accidental – a species that rarely or accidentally occurs in Japan (also called a vagrant)
- (E) Endemic – a species endemic to Japan
- (I) Introduced – a species introduced to Japan as a consequence, direct or indirect, of human actions

== Ducks, geese, and waterfowl ==
Order: Anseriformes Family: Anatidae

Anatidae includes the ducks and most duck-like waterfowl, such as geese and swans. These birds are adapted to an aquatic existence with webbed feet, flattened bills, and feathers that are excellent at shedding water due to an oily coating.

- Lesser whistling duck, Dendrocygna javanica
- Bar-headed goose, Anser indicus (A)
- Emperor goose, Anser canagicus (A)
- Snow goose, Anser caerulescens (A)
- Greylag goose, Anser anser (A)
- Swan goose, Anser cygnoides (A)
- Greater white-fronted goose, Anser albifrons
- Lesser white-fronted goose, Anser erythropus (A)
- Taiga bean-goose, Anser fabalis
- Tundra bean-goose, Anser serrirostris
- Brant, Branta bernicla
- Cackling goose, Branta hutchinsii
- Canada goose, Branta canadensis (A)
- Red-breasted goose, Branta ruficollis (A)
- Mute swan, Cygnus olor (I)
- Trumpeter swan, Cygnus buccinator (A)
- Tundra swan, Cygnus columbianus
- Whooper swan, Cygnus cygnus
- Ruddy shelduck, Tadorna ferruginea (A)
- Common shelduck, Tadorna tadorna
- Crested shelduck, Tadorna cristata
- Cotton pygmy-goose, Nettapus coromandelianus (A)
- Mandarin duck, Aix galericulata
- Baikal teal, Sibirionetta formosa
- Garganey, Spatula querquedula
- Blue-winged teal, Spatula discors (A)
- Northern shoveler, Spatula clypeata
- Gadwall, Mareca strepera
- Falcated duck, Mareca falcata
- Eurasian wigeon, Marecca penelope
- American wigeon, Mareca americana (A)
- Philippine duck, Anas luzonica (A)
- Eastern spot-billed duck, Anas zonorhyncha
- Mallard, Anas platyrhynchos
- Northern pintail, Anas acuta
- Green-winged teal, Anas crecca
- Red-crested pochard, Netta rufina (A)
- Canvasback, Aythya valisineria (A)
- Redhead, Aythya americana (A)
- Common pochard, Aythya ferina
- Ring-necked duck, Aythya collaris (A)
- Ferruginous duck, Aythya nyroca (A)
- Baer's pochard, Aythya baeri
- Tufted duck, Aythya fuligula
- Greater scaup, Aythya marila
- Lesser scaup, Aythya affinis (A)
- Steller's eider, Polysticta stelleri
- King eider, Somateria spectabilis (A)
- Common eider, Somateria mollissima (A)
- Harlequin duck, Histrionicus histrionicus
- Surf scoter, Melanitta perspicillata (A)
- White-winged scoter, Melanitta deglandi (A)
- Stejneger's scoter, Melanitta stejnegeri
- Black scoter, Melanitta americana
- Long-tailed duck, Clangula hyemalis
- Bufflehead, Bucephala albeola (A)
- Common goldeneye, Bucephala clangula
- Smew, Mergellus albellus
- Hooded merganser, Lophodytes cucullatus (A)
- Common merganser, Mergus merganser
- Red-breasted merganser, Mergus serrator
- Scaly-sided merganser, Mergus squamatus (A)

== Pheasants, grouse, and allies ==
Order: Galliformes Family: Phasianidae

Phasianidae consists of the pheasants and their allies. These are terrestrial species, variable in size but generally plump with broad relatively short wings. Many species are gamebirds or have been domesticated as a food source for humans.

- Hazel grouse, Tetrastes bonasia
- Rock ptarmigan, Lagopus muta
- Copper pheasant, Phasianus soemmerringi (E)
- Green pheasant, Phasianus versicolor (E)
- Indian peafowl, Pavo cristatus (I)
- Japanese quail, Coturnix japonica
- Chinese bamboo-partridge, Bambusicola thoracicus (I)
- Taiwan bamboo-partridge, Bambusicola sonorivox (I)

== Grebes ==
Order: Podicipediformes Family: Podicipedidae

Grebes are small to medium-large freshwater diving birds. They have lobed toes and are excellent swimmers and divers. However, they have their feet placed far back on the body, making them quite ungainly on land.

- Little grebe, Tachybaptus ruficollis
- Horned grebe, Podiceps auritus
- Red-necked grebe, Podiceps grisegena
- Great crested grebe, Podiceps cristatus
- Eared grebe, Podiceps nigricollis

== Pigeons and doves ==
Order: Columbiformes Family: Columbidae

Pigeons and doves are stout-bodied birds with short necks and short slender bills with a fleshy cere.

- Rock dove, Columba livia (I)
- Stock dove, Columba oenas (A)
- Japanese wood-pigeon, Columba janthina
- Ryūkyū pigeon, Columba jouyi (E) (extinct)
- Bonin pigeon, Columba versicolor (E) (extinct)
- Oriental turtle-dove, Streptopelia orientalis
- Eurasian collared-dove, Streptopelia decaocta
- Red collared-dove, Streptopelia tranquebarica (A)
- Asian emerald dove, Chalcophaps indica
- White-bellied green-pigeon, Treron sieboldii
- Whistling green-pigeon, Treron formosae
- Black-chinned fruit-dove, Ptilinopus leclancheri (A)

== Sandgrouse ==
Order: Pterocliformes Family: Pteroclidae

Sandgrouse have small, pigeon like heads and necks, but sturdy compact bodies. They have long pointed wings and sometimes tails and a fast direct flight. Flocks fly to watering holes at dawn and dusk. Their legs are feathered down to the toes.

- Pallas's sandgrouse, Syrrhaptes paradoxus (A)

== Bustards ==
Order: Otidiformes Family: Otididae

Bustards are large terrestrial birds mainly associated with dry open country and steppes in the Old World. They are omnivorous and nest on the ground. They walk steadily on strong legs and big toes, pecking for food as they go. They have long broad wings with "fingered" wingtips and striking patterns in flight. Many have interesting mating displays.

- Great bustard, Otis tarda (A)
- Little bustard, Tetrax tetrax (A)

== Cuckoos ==
Order: Cuculiformes Family: Cuculidae

The family Cuculidae includes cuckoos, roadrunners and anis. These birds are of variable size with slender bodies, long tails and strong legs.

- Lesser coucal, Centropus bengalensis (A)
- Chestnut-winged cuckoo, Clamator coromandus (A)
- Asian koel, Eudynamys scolopaceus (A)
- Long-tailed koel, Urodynamis taitensis (A)
- Plaintive cuckoo, Cacomantis merulinus (A)
- Large hawk-cuckoo, Hierococcyx sparverioides (A)
- Northern hawk-cuckoo, Hierococcyx hyperythrus
- Lesser cuckoo, Cuculus poliocephalus
- Indian cuckoo, Cuculus micropterus (A)
- Common cuckoo, Cuculus canorus
- Oriental cuckoo, Cuculus optatus

== Nightjars and allies ==
Order: Caprimulgiformes Family: Caprimulgidae

Nightjars are medium-sized nocturnal birds that usually nest on the ground. They have long wings, short legs and very short bills. Most have small feet, of little use for walking, and long pointed wings. Their soft plumage is camouflaged to resemble bark or leaves.

- Gray nightjar, Caprimulgus jotaka

== Swifts ==
Order: Caprimulgiformes Family: Apodidae

Swifts are small birds which spend the majority of their lives flying. These birds have very short legs and never settle voluntarily on the ground, perching instead only on vertical surfaces. Many swifts have long swept-back wings which resemble a crescent or boomerang.

- White-throated needletail, Hirundapus caudacutus
- Himalayan swiftlet, Aerodramus brevirostris (A)
- Pacific swift, Apus pacificus
- House swift, Apus nipalensis

== Rails, gallinules, and coots ==
Order: Gruiformes Family: Rallidae

Rallidae is a large family of small to medium-sized birds which includes the rails, crakes, coots and gallinules. Typically they inhabit dense vegetation in damp environments near lakes, swamps or rivers. In general they are shy and secretive birds, making them difficult to observe. Most species have strong legs and long toes which are well adapted to soft uneven surfaces. They tend to have short, rounded wings and to be weak fliers.

- Brown-cheeked rail, Rallus indicus
- Corn crake, Crex crex (A)
- Slaty-breasted rail, Lewinia striata (A)
- Okinawa rail, Gallirallus okinawae (E)
- Spotted crake, Porzana porzana
- Eurasian moorhen, Gallinula chloropus
- Eurasian coot, Fulica atra
- White-browed crake, Poliolimnas cinereus (Ex)
- Watercock, Gallicrex cinerea
- White-breasted waterhen, Amaurornis phoenicurus
- Slaty-legged crake, Rallina eurizonoides
- Ruddy-breasted crake, Zapornia fusca
- Band-bellied crake, Zapornia paykullii (A)
- Baillon's crake, Zapornia pusilla (A)
- Swinhoe's rail, Coturnicops exquisitus (A)

== Cranes ==
Order: Gruiformes Family: Gruidae

Cranes are large, long-legged and long-necked birds. Unlike the similar-looking but unrelated herons, cranes fly with necks outstretched, not pulled back. Most have elaborate and noisy courting displays or "dances".

- Demoiselle crane, Anthropoides virgo (A)
- Siberian crane, Leucogeranus leucogeranus (A)
- Sandhill crane, Antigone canadensis (A)
- White-naped crane, Antigone vipio
- Common crane, Grus grus
- Hooded crane, Grus monacha
- Red-crowned crane, Grus japonensis

== Stilts and avocets ==
Order: Charadriiformes Family: Recurvirostridae

Recurvirostridae is a family of large wading birds, which includes the avocets and stilts. The avocets have long legs and long up-curved bills. The stilts have extremely long legs and long, thin, straight bills.

- Black-winged stilt, Himantopus himantopus
- Pied stilt, Himantopus leucocephalus (A)
- Pied avocet, Recurvirostra avosetta (A)

== Oystercatchers ==
Order: Charadriiformes Family: Haematopodidae

The oystercatchers are large and noisy plover-like birds, with strong bills used for smashing or prising open molluscs.

- Eurasian oystercatcher, Haematopus ostralegus

== Plovers and lapwings ==
Order: Charadriiformes Family: Charadriidae

The family Charadriidae includes the plovers, dotterels and lapwings. They are small to medium-sized birds with compact bodies, short, thick necks and long, usually pointed, wings. They are found in open country worldwide, mostly in habitats near water.

- Black-bellied plover, Pluvialis squatarola
- European golden-plover, Pluvialis apricaria (A)
- American golden-plover, Pluvialis dominica (A)
- Pacific golden-plover, Pluvialis fulva
- Northern lapwing, Vanellus vanellus
- Gray-headed lapwing, Vanellus cinereus
- Lesser sand-plover, Charadrius mongolus
- Greater sand-plover, Charadrius leschenaultti
- Kentish plover, Charadrius alexandrinus
- Common ringed plover, Charadrius hiaticula
- Semipalmated plover, Charadrius semipalmatus (A)
- Long-billed plover, Charadrius placidus
- Little ringed plover, Charadrius dubius
- Oriental plover, Charadrius veredus (A)
- Eurasian dotterel, Charadrius morinellus (A)

== Painted-snipes ==
Order: Charadriiformes Family: Rostratulidae

Painted-snipe are short-legged, long-billed birds similar in shape to the true snipes, but more brightly colored.

- Greater painted-snipe, Rostratula benghalensis

== Jacanas ==
Order: Charadriiformes Family: Jacanidae

The jacanas are a group of tropical waders in the family Jacanidae. They are found throughout the tropics. They are identifiable by their huge feet and claws which enable them to walk on floating vegetation in the shallow lakes that are their preferred habitat.

- Pheasant-tailed jacana, Hydrophasianus chirurgus (A)

== Sandpipers and allies ==
Order: Charadriiformes Family: Scolopacidae

Scolopacidae is a large diverse family of small to medium-sized shorebirds including the sandpipers, curlews, godwits, shanks, tattlers, woodcocks, snipes, dowitchers and phalaropes. The majority of these species eat small invertebrates picked out of the mud or soil. Variation in length of legs and bills enables multiple species to feed in the same habitat, particularly on the coast, without direct competition for food.

- Bristle-thighed curlew Numenius tahitiensis (A)
- Whimbrel, Numenius phaeopus
- Little curlew, Numenius minutus (A)
- Far Eastern curlew, Numenius madagascariensis
- Slender-billed curlew, Numenius tenuirostris (A)
- Eurasian curlew, Numenius arquata
- Bar-tailed godwit, Limosa lapponica
- Black-tailed godwit, Limosa limosa
- Hudsonian godwit, Limosa haemastica (A)
- Ruddy turnstone, Arenaria interpres
- Great knot, Calidris tenuirostris
- Red knot, Calidris canutus
- Ruff, Calidris pugnax
- Broad-billed sandpiper, Calidris falcinellus
- Sharp-tailed sandpiper, Calidris acuminata
- Stilt sandpiper, Calidris himantopus (A)
- Curlew sandpiper, Calidris ferruginea
- Temminck's stint, Calidris temminckii
- Long-toed stint, Calidris subminuta
- Spoon-billed sandpiper, Calidris pygmea (A)
- Red-necked stint, Calidris ruficollis
- Sanderling, Calidris alba
- Dunlin, Calidris alpina
- Rock sandpiper, Calidris ptilocnemis
- Baird's sandpiper, Calidris bairdii (A)
- Little stint, Calidris minuta (A)
- Least sandpiper, Calidris minutilla (A)
- White-rumped sandpiper, Calidris fuscicollis (A)
- Buff-breasted sandpiper, Calidris subruficollis (A)
- Pectoral sandpiper, Calidris melanotos
- Western sandpiper, Calidris mauri (A)
- Asian dowitcher, Limnodromus semipalmatus (A)
- Short-billed dowitcher, Limnodromus griseus (A)
- Long-billed dowitcher, Limnodromus scolopaceus
- Jack snipe, Lymnocryptes minimus (A)
- Eurasian woodcock, Scolopax rusticola
- Amami woodcock, Scolopax mira (E)
- Solitary snipe, Gallinago solitaria
- Latham's snipe, Gallinago hardwickii
- Common snipe, Gallinago gallinago
- Pin-tailed snipe, Gallinago stenura
- Swinhoe's snipe, Gallinago megala
- Terek sandpiper, Xenus cinereus
- Wilson's phalarope, Phalaropus tricolor (A)
- Red-necked phalarope, Phalaropus lobatus
- Red phalarope, Phalaropus fulicarius
- Common sandpiper, Actitis hypoleucos
- Spotted sandpiper, Actitis macularius (A)
- Green sandpiper, Tringa ochropus
- Gray-tailed tattler, Tringa brevipes
- Wandering tattler, Tringa incana (A)
- Spotted redshank, Tringa erythropus
- Greater yellowlegs, Tringa melanoleuca (A)
- Common greenshank, Tringa nebularia
- Nordmann's greenshank, Tringa guttifer (A)
- Lesser yellowlegs, Tringa flavipes (A)
- Marsh sandpiper, Tringa stagnatilis
- Wood sandpiper, Tringa glareola
- Common redshank, Tringa totanus

== Buttonquails ==
Order: Charadriiformes Family: Turnicidae

The buttonquails are small, drab, running birds which resemble the true quails. The female is the brighter of the sexes and initiates courtship. The male incubates the eggs and tends the young.

- Barred buttonquail, Turnix suscitator

== Pratincoles and coursers ==
Order: Charadriiformes Family: Glareolidae

Glareolidae is a family of wading birds comprising the pratincoles, which have short legs, long pointed wings and long forked tails, and the coursers, which have long legs, short wings and long, pointed bills which curve downwards.

- Oriental pratincole, Glareola maldivarum

== Skuas and jaegers ==
Order: Charadriiformes Family: Stercorariidae

The family Stercorariidae are, in general, medium to large birds, typically with gray or brown plumage, often with white markings on the wings. They nest on the ground in temperate and arctic regions and are long-distance migrants.

- South polar skua, Stercorarius maccormicki
- Pomarine jaeger, Stercorarius pomarinus
- Parasitic jaeger, Stercorarius parasiticus
- Long-tailed jaeger, Stercorarius longicaudus

== Auks, murres, and puffins ==
Order: Charadriiformes Family: Alcidae

Alcids are superficially similar to penguins due to their black-and-white colors, their upright posture and some of their habits, however they are not related to the penguins and differ in being able to fly. Auks live on the open sea, only deliberately coming ashore to nest.

- Dovekie, Alle alle (A)
- Common murre, Uria aalge
- Thick-billed murre, Uria lomvia
- Razorbill, Alca torda (A)
- Pigeon guillemot, Cepphus columba
- Spectacled guillemot, Cepphus carbo
- Long-billed murrelet, Brachyramphus perdix
- Ancient murrelet, Synthliboramphus antiquus
- Japanese murrelet, Synthliboramphus wumizusume
- Parakeet auklet, Aethia psittacula
- Least auklet, Aethia pusilla
- Whiskered auklet, Aethia pygmaea (A)
- Crested auklet, Aethia cristatella
- Rhinoceros auklet, Cerorhinca monocerata
- Horned puffin, Fratercula corniculata (A)
- Tufted puffin, Fratercula cirrhata

== Gulls, terns, and skimmers ==
Order: Charadriiformes Family: Laridae

Laridae is a family of medium to large seabirds, the gulls, terns and skimmers. Gulls are typically gray or white, often with black markings on the head or wings. They have stout, longish bills and webbed feet. Terns are a group of generally medium to large seabirds typically with gray or white plumage, often with black markings on the head. Most terns hunt fish by diving but some pick insects off the surface of fresh water. Terns are generally long-lived birds, with several species known to live in excess of 30 years. Skimmers are a small family of tropical tern-like birds. They have an elongated lower mandible which they use to feed by flying low over the water surface and skimming the water for small fish.

- Black-legged kittiwake, Rissa tridactyla
- Red-legged kittiwake, Rissa brevirostris (A)
- Ivory gull, Pagophila eburnea (A)
- Sabine's gull, Xema sabini (A)
- Saunders's gull, Saundersilarus saundersi
- Slender-billed gull, Chroicocephalus genei (A)
- Bonaparte's gull, Chroicocephalus philadelphia (A)
- Silver gull, Chroicocephalus novaehollandiae (A)
- Black-headed gull, Chroicocephalus ridibundus
- Brown-headed gull, Chroicocephalus brunnicephalus (A)
- Little gull, Hydrocoloeus minutus (A)
- Ross's gull, Rhodostethia rosea (A)
- Laughing gull, Leucophaeus atricilla (A)
- Franklin's gull, Leucophaeus pipixcan (A)
- Relict gull, Ichthyaetus relictus (A)
- Pallas's gull, Ichthyaetus ichthyaetus (A)
- Black-tailed gull, Larus crassirostris
- Common gull, Larus canus
- Short-billed gull, Larus brachyrhynchus (A)
- Ring-billed gull, Larus delawarensis (A)
- Herring gull, Larus argentatus
- Caspian gull, Larus cachinnans (A)
- Iceland gull, Larus glaucoides (A)
- Lesser black-backed gull, Larus fuscus (A)
- Slaty-backed gull, Larus schistisagus
- Glaucous-winged gull, Larus glaucescens
- Glaucous gull, Larus hyperboreus
- Brown noddy, Anous stolidus
- Black noddy, Anous minutus (A)
- Blue-gray noddy, Anous ceruleus (A)
- White tern, Gygis alba (A)
- Sooty tern, Onychoprion fuscatus
- Gray-backed tern, Onychoprion lunatus (A)
- Bridled tern, Onychoprion anaethetus
- Aleutian tern, Onychoprion aleuticus (A)
- Little tern, Sternula albifrons
- Least tern, Sternula antillarum (A)
- Gull-billed tern, Gelochelidon nilotica (A)
- Caspian tern, Hydroprogne caspia (A)
- Black tern, Chlidonias niger (A)
- White-winged tern, Chlidonias leucopterus
- Whiskered tern, Chlidonias hybrida
- Roseate tern, Sterna dougallii
- Black-naped tern, Sterna sumatrana
- Common tern, Sterna hirundo
- Arctic tern, Sterna paradisaea (A)
- Greater crested tern, Thalasseus bergii
- Lesser crested tern, Thalasseus bengalensis (A)
- Chinese crested tern, Thalasseus bernsteini (A)

== Tropicbirds ==
Order: Phaethontiformes Family: Phaethontidae

Tropicbirds are slender white birds of tropical oceans, with exceptionally long central tail feathers. Their heads and long wings have black markings.

- White-tailed tropicbird, Phaethon lepturus (A)
- Red-tailed tropicbird, Phaethon rubricauda

== Loons ==
Order: Gaviiformes Family: Gaviidae

Loons, known as divers in Europe, are a group of aquatic birds found in many parts of North America and northern Europe. They are the size of a large duck or small goose, which they somewhat resemble when swimming, but to which they are completely unrelated.

- Red-throated loon, Gavia stellata
- Arctic loon, Gavia arctica
- Pacific loon, Gavia pacifica
- Common loon, Gavia immer (A)
- Yellow-billed loon, Gavia adamsii

== Albatrosses ==
Order: Procellariiformes Family: Diomedeidae

The albatrosses are among the largest of flying birds, and the great albatrosses from the genus Diomedea have the largest wingspans of any extant birds.

- Laysan albatross, Phoebastria immutabilis
- Black-footed albatross, Phoebastria nigripes
- Short-tailed albatross, Phoebastria albatrus

== Southern storm-petrels ==
Order: Procellariiformes Family: Oceanitidae

The southern storm-petrels are the smallest seabirds, relatives of the petrels, feeding on planktonic crustaceans and small fish picked from the surface, typically while hovering. The flight is fluttering and sometimes bat-like. Until 2018, this family's species were included with the other storm-petrels in family Hydrobatidae.

- Black-bellied storm-petrel, Fregetta tropica (A)
- Wilson's storm-petrel, Oceanites oceanicus (A)

== Northern storm-petrels ==
Order: Procellariiformes Family: Hydrobatidae

The northern storm-petrels are relatives of the petrels and are the smallest seabirds. They feed on planktonic crustaceans and small fish picked from the surface, typically while hovering. The flight is fluttering and sometimes bat-like.

- Fork-tailed storm-petrel, Hydrobates furcatus
- Leach's storm-petrel, Hydrobates leucorhous
- Swinhoe's storm-petrel, Hydrobates monorhis
- Band-rumped storm-petrel, Hydrobates castro
- Matsudaira's storm-petrel, Hydrobates matsudairae
- Tristram's storm-petrel, Hydrobates tristrami

== Shearwaters and petrels ==
Order: Procellariiformes Family: Procellariidae

The procellariids are the main group of medium-sized "true petrels", characterized by united nostrils with medium septum and a long outer functional primary.

- Northern fulmar, Fulmarus glacialis
- Kermadec petrel, Pterodroma neglecta (A)
- Murphy's petrel, Pterodroma ultima (A)
- Providence petrel, Pterodroma solandri (A)
- Mottled petrel, Pterodroma inexpectata (A)
- Juan Fernández petrel, Pterodroma externa (A)
- Hawaiian petrel, Pterodroma sandwichensis (A)
- White-necked petrel, Pterodroma cervicalis (A)
- Bonin petrel, Pterodroma hypoleuca
- Black-winged petrel, Pterodroma nigripennis (A)
- Stejneger's petrel, Pterodroma longirostris (A)
- Bulwer's petrel, Bulweria bulwerii
- Tahiti petrel, Pseudobulweria rostrata (A)
- Streaked shearwater, Calonectris leucomelas
- Pink-footed shearwater, Ardenna creatopus (A)
- Flesh-footed shearwater, Ardenna carneipes
- Wedge-tailed shearwater, Ardenna pacifica
- Buller's shearwater, Ardenna bulleri (A)
- Sooty shearwater, Ardenna grisea
- Short-tailed shearwater, Ardenna tenuirostris
- Christmas shearwater, Puffinus nativitatis (A)
- Manx shearwater, Puffinus puffinus (A)
- Bannerman's shearwater, Puffinus bannermani
- Newell's shearwater, Puffinus newelli (A)
- Bryan's shearwater, Puffinus bryani
- Tropical shearwater, Puffinus bailloni

== Storks ==
Order: Ciconiiformes Family: Ciconiidae

Storks are large, long-legged, long-necked, wading birds with long, stout bills. Storks are mute, but bill-clattering is an important mode of communication at the nest. Their nests can be large and may be reused for many years. Many species are migratory.

- Black stork, Ciconia nigra (A)
- Oriental stork, Ciconia boyciana

== Frigatebirds ==
Order: Suliformes Family: Fregatidae

Frigatebirds are large seabirds usually found over tropical oceans. They are large, black-and-white or completely black, with long wings and deeply forked tails. The males have colored inflatable throat pouches. They do not swim or walk and cannot take off from a flat surface. Having the largest wingspan-to-body-weight ratio of any bird, they are essentially aerial, able to stay aloft for more than a week.

- Lesser frigatebird, Fregata ariel (A)
- Great frigatebird, Fregata minor (A)

== Boobies and gannets ==
Order: Suliformes Family: Sulidae

The sulids comprise the gannets and boobies. Both groups are medium to large coastal seabirds that plunge-dive for fish.

- Masked booby, Sula dactylatra
- Nazca booby, Sula granti (A)
- Brown booby, Sula leucogaster
- Red-footed booby, Sula sula

== Cormorants and shags ==
Order: Suliformes Family: Phalacrocoracidae

Phalacrocoracidae is a family of medium to large coastal, fish-eating seabirds that includes cormorants and shags. Plumage coloration varies, with the majority having mainly dark plumage, some species being black-and-white and a few being colorful.

- Red-faced cormorant, Urile urile
- Pelagic cormorant, Urile pelagicus
- Great cormorant, Phalacrocorax carbo
- Japanese cormorant, Phalacrocorax capillatus

== Pelicans ==
Order: Pelecaniformes Family: Pelecanidae

Pelicans are large water birds with a distinctive pouch under their beak. As with other members of the order Pelecaniformes, they have webbed feet with four toes.

- Great white pelican, Pelecanus onocrotalus (A)
- Spot-billed pelican, Pelecanus philippensis (A)
- Dalmatian pelican, Pelecanus crispus (A)

== Herons, egrets, and bitterns ==
Order: Pelecaniformes Family: Ardeidae

The family Ardeidae contains the herons, egrets, and bitterns. Herons and egrets are medium to large wading birds with long necks and legs. Bitterns tend to be shorter necked and more wary. Members of Ardeidae fly with their necks retracted, unlike other long-necked birds such as storks, ibises and spoonbills.

- Great bittern, Botaurus stellaris
- Yellow bittern, Ixobrychus sinensis
- Schrenk's bittern, Ixobrychus eurythmus
- Cinnamon bittern, Ixobrychus cinnamomeus
- Black bittern, Ixobrychus flavicollis (A)
- Gray heron, Ardea cinerea
- Purple heron, Ardea purpurea
- Great egret, Ardea alba
- Intermediate egret, Ardea intermedia
- Chinese egret, Egretta eulophotes
- Little egret, Egretta garzetta
- Pacific reef-heron, Egretta sacra
- Cattle egret, Bubulcus ibis
- Indian pond-heron, Ardeola grayii (A)
- Chinese pond-heron, Ardeola bacchus
- Javan pond-heron, Ardeola speciosa (A)
- Striated heron, Butorides striata
- Black-crowned night-heron, Nycticorax nycticorax
- Nankeen night-heron, Nycticorax caledonicus (extirpated)
- Japanese night-heron, Gorsachius goisagi
- Malayan night heron, Gorsachius melanolophus

== Ibises and spoonbills ==
Order: Pelecaniformes Family: Threskiornithidae

Threskiornithidae is a family of large terrestrial and wading birds which includes the ibises and spoonbills. They have long, broad wings with 11 primary and about 20 secondary feathers. They are strong fliers and despite their size and weight, very capable soarers.

- Glossy ibis, Plegadis falcinellus (A)
- Black-headed ibis, Threskiornis melanocephalus (A)
- Crested ibis, Nipponia nippon (reintroduced)
- Eurasian spoonbill, Platalea leucorodia
- Black-faced spoonbill, Platalea minor

== Osprey ==
Order: Accipitriformes Family: Pandionidae

The family Pandionidae contains only one species, the osprey. The osprey is a medium-large raptor which is a specialist fish-eater with a worldwide distribution.

- Osprey, Pandion haliaetus

== Hawks, eagles, and kites ==
Order: Accipitriformes Family: Accipitridae

Accipitridae is a family of birds of prey, which includes hawks, eagles, kites, harriers and Old World vultures. These birds have powerful hooked beaks for tearing flesh from their prey, strong legs, powerful talons and keen eyesight.

- Black-winged kite, Elanus caeruleus (A)
- Oriental honey-buzzard, Pernis ptilorhynchus
- Cinereous vulture, Aegypius monachus (A)
- Crested serpent-eagle, Spilornis cheela
- Mountain hawk-eagle, Nisaetus nipalensis
- Greater spotted eagle, Clanga clanga (A)
- Imperial eagle, Aquila heliaca
- Golden eagle, Aquila chrysaetos
- Gray-faced buzzard, Butastur indicus
- Eurasian marsh-harrier, Circus aeruginosus (A)
- Eastern marsh-harrier, Circus spilonotus
- Hen harrier, Circus cyaneus
- Northern harrier, Circus hudsonius (A)
- Pallid harrier, Circus macrourus (A)
- Pied harrier, Circus melanoleucos (A)
- Chinese sparrowhawk, Accipiter soloensis
- Japanese sparrowhawk, Accipiter gularis
- Eurasian sparrowhawk, Accipiter nisus
- Eurasian goshawk, Accipiter gentilis
- Black kite, Milvus migrans
- Brahminy kite, Haliastur indus (A)
- Bald eagle, Haliaeetus leucocephalus (A)
- White-tailed eagle, Haliaeetus albicilla
- Steller's sea-eagle, Haliaeetus pelagicus
- Rough-legged hawk, Buteo lagopus
- Eastern buzzard, Buteo japonicus
- Upland buzzard, Buteo hemilasius (A)

== Barn-owls ==
Order: Strigiformes Family: Tytonidae

Barn-owls are medium to large owls with large heads and characteristic heart-shaped faces. They have long strong legs with powerful talons.

- Australasian grass-owl, Tyto longimembris (A)

== Owls ==
Order: Strigiformes Family: Strigidae

The owls are small to large solitary nocturnal birds of prey. They have large forward-facing eyes and ears, a hawk-like beak and a conspicuous circle of feathers around each eye called a facial disk.

- Collared scops-owl, Otus lettia (A)
- Japanese scops-owl, Otus semitorques
- Ryūkyū scops-owl, Otus elegans
- Oriental scops-owl, Otus sunia
- Eurasian eagle-owl, Bubo bubo (A)
- Snowy owl, Bubo scandiacus (A)
- Blakiston's fish-owl, Ketupa blakistoni
- Ural owl, Strix uralensis
- Long-eared owl, Asio otus
- Short-eared owl, Asio flammeus
- Boreal owl, Aegolius funereus
- Northern boobook, Ninox japonica

== Hoopoes ==
Order: Bucerotiformes Family: Upupidae

Hoopoes have black, white and orangey-pink coloring with a long crest on their head, the plumage of which sweeps backward at rest but can be flexed to an erect position.

- Eurasian hoopoe, Upupa epops

== Kingfishers ==
Order: Coraciiformes Family: Alcedinidae

Kingfishers are medium-sized birds with large heads, long, pointed bills, short legs and stubby tails.

- Common kingfisher, Alcedo atthis
- Black-backed dwarf-kingfisher, Ceyx erithaca (A)
- Ruddy kingfisher, Halcyon coromanda
- White-throated kingfisher, Halcyon smyrnensis (A)
- Black-capped kingfisher, Halcyon pileata (A)
- Guam kingfisher, Todirhamphus cinnamominus (extirpated)
  - Ryukyu kingfisher, Todiramphus cinnamominus miyakoensis (extinct)
- Collared kingfisher, Todirhamphus chloris (A)
- Crested kingfisher, Megaceryle lugubris

== Bee-eaters ==
Order: Coraciiformes Family: Meropidae

The bee-eaters are a group of coraciiform birds in the family Meropidae. They are characterized by richly colored plumage, slender bodies and usually elongated central tail feathers. All are colorful and have long downturned bills and pointed wings, which give them a swallow-like appearance when seen from afar.

- Blue-tailed bee-eater, Merops philippinus (A)
- Rainbow bee-eater, Merops ornatus (A)

== Rollers ==
Order: Coraciiformes Family: Coraciidae

Rollers resemble crows in size and build, but are more closely related to the kingfishers and bee-eaters. They share the colorful appearance of those groups with blues and browns predominating. The two inner front toes are connected, but the outer toe is not.

- Dollarbird, Eurystomus orientalis

== Woodpeckers ==
Order: Piciformes Family: Picidae

Woodpeckers are small to medium-sized birds with chisel-like beaks, short legs, stiff tails and long tongues used for capturing insects. Some species have feet with two toes pointing forward and two backward, while several species have only three toes. Many woodpeckers have the habit of tapping noisily on tree trunks with their beaks.

- Eurasian wryneck, Jynx torquilla
- Eurasian three-toed woodpecker, Picoides tridactylus (A)
- Japanese pygmy woodpecker, Yungipicus kizuki
- Rufous-bellied woodpecker, Dendrocopos hyperythrus (A)
- Okinawa woodpecker, Dendrocopos noguchii (E)
- White-backed woodpecker, Dendrocopos leucotos
  - Amami woodpecker, Dendrocopos leucotos owstoni (E)
- Great spotted woodpecker, Dendrocopos major
- Lesser spotted woodpecker, Dryobates minor
- Japanese woodpecker, Picus awokera (E)
- Gray-headed woodpecker, Picus canus
- White-bellied woodpecker, Dryocopus javensis (A)
- Black woodpecker, Dryocopus martius

== Falcons and caracaras ==
Order: Falconiformes Family: Falconidae

Falconidae is a family of diurnal birds of prey. They differ from hawks, eagles and kites in that they kill with their beaks instead of their talons.

- Lesser kestrel, Falco naumanni (A)
- Eurasian kestrel, Falco tinnunculus
- Amur falcon, Falco amurensis (A)
- Merlin, Falco columbarius
- Eurasian hobby, Falco subbuteo
- Saker falcon, Falco cherrug (A)
- Gyrfalcon, Falco rusticolus
- Peregrine falcon, Falco peregrinus

== Old World parrots ==
Order: Psittaciformes Family: Psittaculidae

Characteristic features of parrots include a strong curved bill, an upright stance, strong legs, and clawed zygodactyl feet. Many parrots are vividly colored, and some are multi-colored. In size they range from 8 cm (3.1 in) to 1 m (3.3 ft) in length. Old World parrots are found from Africa east across south and southeast Asia and Oceania to Australia and New Zealand.

- Alexandrine parakeet, Psittacula eupatria (I)
- Rose-ringed parakeet, Psittacula krameri (I)
- Red-breasted Parakeet, Psittacula alexandri (I)
- Budgerigar, Melopsittacus undulatus (I)

== Pittas ==
Order: Passeriformes Family: Pittidae

Pittas are medium-sized by passerine standards and are stocky, with fairly long, strong legs, short tails and stout bills. Many, but not all, are brightly colored. They spend the majority of their time on wet forest floors, eating snails, insects and similar invertebrates.

- Fairy pitta, Pitta nympha
- Hooded pitta, Pitta sordida (A)

== Cuckooshrikes ==
Order: Passeriformes Family: Campephagidae

The cuckooshrikes are small to medium-sized passerine birds. They are predominantly grayish with white and black, although some species are brightly colored.

- Ryūkyū minivet, Pericrocotus tegimae (E)
- Ashy minivet, Pericrocotus divaricatus
- Black-winged cuckooshrike, Lalage melaschistos (A)

== Old World orioles ==
Order: Passeriformes Family: Oriolidae

The Old World orioles are colorful passerine birds. They are not related to the New World orioles.

- Black-naped oriole, Oriolus chinensis

== Woodswallows ==
Order: Passeriformes Family: Artamidae

The woodswallows are soft-plumaged, somber-colored passerine birds. They are smooth, agile flyers with moderately large, semi-triangular wings.

- White-breasted woodswallow, Artamus leucorhynchus (A)

== Drongos ==
Order: Passeriformes Family: Dicruridae

The drongos are mostly black or dark gray in color, sometimes with metallic tints. They have long forked tails, and some Asian species have elaborate tail decorations. They have short legs and sit very upright when perched, like a shrike. They flycatch or take prey from the ground.

- Black drongo, Dicrurus macrocercus (A)
- Ashy drongo, Dicrurus leucophaeus (A)
- Hair-crested drongo, Dicrurus hottentottus (A)

== Monarch flycatchers ==
Order: Passeriformes Family: Monarchidae

The monarch flycatchers are small to medium-sized insectivorous passerines which hunt by gleaning, hovering or flycatching.

- Black-naped monarch, Hypothymis azurea (A)
- Japanese paradise-flycatcher, Terpsiphone atrocaudata

== Shrikes ==
Order: Passeriformes Family: Laniidae

Shrikes are passerine birds known for their habit of catching other birds and small animals and impaling the uneaten portions of their bodies on thorns. A typical shrike's beak is hooked, like a bird of prey.

- Tiger shrike, Lanius tigrinus
- Bull-headed shrike, Lanius bucephalus
- Red-backed shrike, Lanius collurio (A)
- Isabelline shrike, Lanius isabellinus (A)
- Brown shrike, Lanius cristatus
- Long-tailed shrike, Lanius schach (A)
- Northern shrike, Lanius borealis
- Chinese gray shrike, Lanius sphenocercus (A)

== Crows, jays, and magpies ==
Order: Passeriformes Family: Corvidae

The family Corvidae includes crows, ravens, jays, choughs, magpies, treepies, nutcrackers and ground jays. Corvids are above average in size among the Passeriformes, and some of the larger species show high levels of intelligence.

- Eurasian jay, Garrulus glandarius
- Lidth's jay, Garrulus lidthi (E)
- Azure-winged magpie, Cyanopica cyana
- Oriental magpie, Pica serica
- Eurasian nutcracker, Nucifraga caryocatactes
- Eurasian jackdaw, Corvus monedula (A)
- Daurian jackdaw, Corvus dauuricus
- Rook, Corvus frugilegus
- Carrion crow, Corvus corone
- Large-billed crow, Corvus macrorhynchos
- Common raven, Corvus corax

== Tits, chickadees, and titmice ==
Order: Passeriformes Family: Paridae

The Paridae are mainly small stocky woodland species with short stout bills. Some have crests. They are adaptable birds, with a mixed diet including seeds and insects.

- Coal tit, Periparus ater
- Yellow-bellied tit, Pardaliparus venustulus (A)
- Iriomote tit, Sittiparus olivaceus (E)
- Varied tit, Sittiparus varius
- Owston's tit, Sittiparus owstoni (E)
- Marsh tit, Poecile palustris
- Willow tit, Poecile montanus
- Azure tit, Cyanistes cyanus (A)
- Cinereous tit, Parus cinereus

== Penduline-tits ==
Order: Passeriformes Family: Remizidae

The penduline-tits are a group of small passerine birds related to the true tits. They are insectivores.

- Chinese penduline-tit, Remiz consobrinus

== Larks ==
Order: Passeriformes Family: Alaudidae

Larks are small terrestrial birds with often extravagant songs and display flights. Most larks are fairly dull in appearance. Their food is insects and seeds.

- Horned lark, Eremophila alpestris (A)
- Greater short-toed lark, Calandrella brachydactyla (A)
- Mongolian short-toed lark, Calandrella dukhunensis (A)
- Bimaculated lark, Melanocorypha bimaculata (A)
- Mongolian lark, Melanocorypha mongolica (A)
- Asian short-toed lark, Alaudala cheleensis (A)
- Eurasian skylark, Alauda arvensis
  - Japanese skylark, Alauda arvensis japonica (E)

== Bearded reedling ==
Order: Passeriformes Family: Panuridae

A single species formerly placed in the Old World babbler family.

- Bearded reedling, Panurus biarmicus (A)

== Cisticolas and allies ==
Order: Passeriformes Family: Cisticolidae

The Cisticolidae are warblers found mainly in warmer southern regions of the Old World. They are generally very small birds of drab brown or gray appearance found in open country such as grassland or scrub.

- Plain prinia, Prinia inornata (A)
- Zitting cisticola, Cisticola juncidis

== Reed warblers and allies ==
Order: Passeriformes Family: Acrocephalidae

The members of this family are usually rather large for "warblers". Most are rather plain olivaceous brown above with much yellow to beige below. They are usually found in open woodland, reedbeds, or tall grass. The family occurs mostly in southern to western Eurasia and surroundings, but it also ranges far into the Pacific, with some species in Africa.

- Thick-billed warbler, Arundinax aedon (A)
- Booted warbler, Iduna caligata (A)
- Icterine warbler, Hippolais icterina (A)
- Black-browed reed warbler, Acrocephalus bistrigiceps
- Streaked reed warbler, Acrocephalus sorghophilus (A)
- Sedge warbler, Acrocephalus schoenobaenus (A)
- Paddyfield warbler, Acrocephalus agricola (A)
- Manchurian reed warbler, Acrocephalus tangorum (A)
- Blyth's reed warbler, Acrocephalus dumetorum (A)
- Oriental reed warbler, Acrocephalus orientalis

== Grassbirds and allies ==
Order: Passeriformes Family: Locustellidae

Locustellidae are a family of small insectivorous songbirds found mainly in Eurasia, Africa, and the Australian region. They are smallish birds with tails that are usually long and pointed, and tend to be drab brownish or buffy all over.

- Sakhalin grasshopper warbler, Helopsaltes amnicola
- Marsh grassbird, Helopsaltes pryeri
- Pallas's grasshopper warbler, Helopsaltes certhiola (A)
- Middendorff's grasshopper warbler, Helopsaltes ochotensis
- Pleske's grasshopper warbler, Helopsaltes pleskei
- Lanceolated warbler, Locustella lanceolata

== Swallows ==
Order: Passeriformes Family: Hirundinidae

The family Hirundinidae is adapted to aerial feeding. They have a slender streamlined body, long pointed wings and a short bill with a wide gape. The feet are adapted to perching rather than walking, and the front toes are partially joined at the base.

- Tree swallow, Tachycineta bicolor (A)
- Gray-throated martin, Riparia chinensis (A)
- Bank swallow, Riparia riparia
- Barn swallow, Hirundo rustica
- Pacific swallow, Hirundo tahitica
- Red-rumped swallow, Cecropis daurica
- Common house-martin, Delichon urbicum (A)
- Asian house-martin, Delichon dasypus

== Bulbuls ==
Order: Passeriformes Family: Pycnonotidae

Bulbuls are medium-sized songbirds. Some are colorful with yellow, red or orange vents, cheeks, throats or supercilia, but most are drab, with uniform olive-brown to black plumage. Some species have distinct crests.

- Red-whiskered bulbul, Pycnonotus jocosus (I)
- Light-vented bulbul, Pycnonotus sinensis
- Brown-eared bulbul, Hypsipetes amaurotis

== Leaf warblers ==
Order: Passeriformes Family: Phylloscopidae

Leaf warblers are a family of small insectivorous birds found mostly in Eurasia and ranging into Wallacea and Africa. The species are of various sizes, often green-plumaged above and yellow below, or more subdued with greyish-green to greyish-brown colours.

- Wood warbler, Phylloscopus sibilatrix (A)
- Yellow-browed warbler, Phylloscopus inornatus
- Chinese leaf warbler, Phylloscopus yunnanensis (A)
- Pallas's leaf warbler, Phylloscopus proregulus (A)
- Radde's warbler, Phylloscopus schwarzi (A)
- Tickell's leaf warbler, Phylloscopus affinis (A)
- Dusky warbler, Phylloscopus fuscatus (A)
- Willow warbler, Phylloscopus trochilus (A)
- Common chiffchaff, Phylloscopus collybita (A)
- Eastern crowned warbler, Phylloscopus coronatus
- Ijima's leaf warbler, Phylloscopus ijimae
- Two-barred warbler, Phylloscopus plumbeitarsus (A)
- Pale-legged leaf warbler, Phylloscopus tenellipes (A)
- Sakhalin leaf warbler, Phylloscopus borealoides
- Japanese leaf warbler, Phylloscopus xanthodryas
- Arctic warbler, Phylloscopus borealis
- Kamchatka leaf warbler, Phylloscopus examinandus
- Sulphur-breasted warbler, Phylloscopus ricketti (A)
- Claudia's leaf warbler, Phylloscopus claudiae (A)

== Bush warblers and allies ==
Order: Passeriformes Family: Scotocercidae

The members of this family are found throughout Africa, Asia, and Polynesia. Their taxonomy is in flux, and some authorities place some genera in other families.

- Asian stubtail, Urosphena squameiceps
- Japanese bush warbler, Horornis diphone
- Manchurian bush warbler, Horornis borealis (A)

== Long-tailed tits ==
Order: Passeriformes Family: Aegithalidae

Long-tailed tits are a group of small passerine birds with medium to long tails. They make woven bag nests in trees. Most eat a mixed diet which includes insects.

- Long-tailed tit, Aegithalos caudatus

== Sylviid warblers, parrotbills, and allies ==
Order: Passeriformes Family: Sylviidae

The family Sylviidae is a group of small insectivorous passerine birds. They mainly occur as breeding species, as the common name implies, in Europe, Asia and, to a lesser extent, Africa. Most are of generally undistinguished appearance, but many have distinctive songs.

- Lesser whitethroat, Curruca curruca (A)
- Greater whitethroat, Curruca communis (A)

== White-eyes, yuhinas, and allies ==
Order: Passeriformes Family: Zosteropidae

The white-eyes are small and mostly undistinguished, their plumage above being generally some dull color like greenish-olive, but some species have a white or bright yellow throat, breast or lower parts, and several have buff flanks. As their name suggests, many species have a white ring around each eye.

- Bonin white-eye, Apalopteron familiare (E)
- Chestnut-flanked white-eye, Zosterops erythropleurus (A)
- Warbling white-eye, Zosterops japonicus

== Laughingthrushes and allies ==
Order: Passeriformes Family: Leiothrichidae

The members of this family are diverse in size and colouration, though those of genus Turdoides tend to be brown or greyish. The family is found in Africa, India, and southeast Asia.

- Red-billed leiothrix, Leiothrix lutea (I)
- Chinese hwamei, Garrulax canorus (I)
- Moustached laughingthrush, Ianthocincla cineracea (I)
- White-browed laughingthrush, Pterorhinus sannio (I)

== Kinglets ==
Order: Passeriformes Family: Regulidae

The kinglets, also called crests, are a small group of birds often included in the Old World warblers, but frequently given family status because they also resemble the titmice.

- Ruby-crowned kinglet, Corthylio calendula (A)
- Goldcrest, Regulus regulus

== Nuthatches ==
Order: Passeriformes Family: Sittidae

Nuthatches are small woodland birds. They have the unusual ability to climb down trees head first, unlike other birds which can only go upwards. Nuthatches have big heads, short tails and powerful bills and feet.

- Eurasian nuthatch, Sitta europaea

== Treecreepers ==
Order: Passeriformes Family: Certhiidae

Treecreepers are small woodland birds, brown above and white below. They have thin pointed down-curved bills, which they use to extricate insects from bark. They have stiff tail feathers, like woodpeckers, which they use to support themselves on vertical trees.

- Eurasian treecreeper, Certhia familiaris

== Wrens ==
Order: Passeriformes Family: Troglodytidae

The wrens are mainly small and inconspicuous except for their loud songs. These birds have short wings and thin down-turned bills. Several species often hold their tails upright. All are insectivorous.

- Eurasian wren, Troglodytes troglodytes

== Dippers ==
Order: Passeriformes Family: Cinclidae

Dippers are a group of perching birds whose habitat includes aquatic environments in the Americas, Europe and Asia.

- Brown dipper, Cinclus pallasii

== Starlings ==
Order: Passeriformes Family: Sturnidae

Starlings are small to medium-sized passerine birds. Their flight is strong and direct and they are very gregarious. Their preferred habitat is fairly open country. They eat insects and fruit. Plumage is typically dark with a metallic sheen.

- Asian glossy starling, Aplonis panayensis (A)
- European starling, Sturnus vulgaris
- Rosy starling, Pastor roseus (A)
- Daurian starling, Agropsar sturninus (A)
- Chestnut-cheeked starling, Agropsar philippensis
- Siamese pied starling, Gracupica floweri; (I)
- White-shouldered starling, Sturnia sinensis
- Red-billed starling, Spodiopsar sericeus (A)
- White-cheeked starling, Spodiopsar cineraceus
- Common myna, Acridotheres tristis (I)
- Bank myna, Acridotheres ginginianus (I)
- Javan myna, Acridotheres javanicus (A)
- Crested myna, Acridotheres cristatellus (I)

== Thrushes and allies ==
Order: Passeriformes Family: Turdidae

The thrushes are a group of passerine birds that occur mainly in the Old World. They are plump, soft plumaged, small to medium-sized insectivores or sometimes omnivores, often feeding on the ground. Many have attractive songs.

- White's thrush, Zoothera aurea
- Scaly thrush, Zoothera dauma
- Amami thrush, Zoothera major (E)
- Bonin thrush, Zoothera terrestris (E) extinct
- Gray-cheeked thrush, Catharus minimus (A)
- Siberian thrush, Geokichla sibirica
- Chinese thrush, Turdus mupinensis (A)
- Mistle thrush, Turdus viscivorus (A)
- Song thrush, Turdus philomelos (A)
- Redwing, Turdus iliacus (A)
- Chinese blackbird, Turdus mandarinus (A)
- American robin, Turdus migratorius (A)
- Japanese thrush, Turdus cardis
- Gray-backed thrush, Turdus hortulorum (A)
- Eyebrowed thrush, Turdus obscurus
- Brown-headed thrush, Turdus chrysolaus
- Izu thrush, Turdus celaenops (E)
- Pale thrush, Turdus pallidus
- Fieldfare, Turdus pilaris (A)
- Black-throated thrush, Turdus atrogularis (A)
- Red-throated thrush, Turdus ruficollis (A)
- Dusky thrush, Turdus eunomus
- Naumann's thrush, Turdus naumanni (A)

== Old World flycatchers ==
Order: Passeriformes Family: Muscicapidae

Old World flycatchers are a large group of small passerine birds native to the Old World. They are mainly small arboreal insectivores. The appearance of these birds is highly varied, but they mostly have weak songs and harsh calls.

- Gray-streaked flycatcher, Muscicapa griseisticta
- Dark-sided flycatcher, Muscicapa sibirica
- Ferruginous flycatcher, Muscicapa ferruginea (A)
- Asian brown flycatcher, Muscicapa dauurica
- Spotted flycatcher, Muscicapa striata (A)
- Oriental magpie-robin, Copsychus saularis (A)
- Fujian niltava, Niltava davidi (A)
- Vivid niltava, Niltava vivida (A)
- Blue-and-white flycatcher, Cyanoptila cyanomelana
- Zappey's flycatcher, Cyanoptila cumatilis (A)
- Verditer flycatcher, Eumyias thalassinus (A)
- European robin, Erithacus rubecula (A)
- Rufous-tailed robin, Larvivora sibilans
- Japanese robin, Larvivora akahige
- Izu robin, Larvivora tanensis (E)
- Ryūkyū robin, Larvivora komadori (E)
- Okinawa robin, Larvivora namiyei (E)
- Siberian blue robin, Larvivora cyane
- Bluethroat, Luscinia svecica (A)
- Siberian rubythroat, Calliope calliope
- Himalayan rubythroat, Calliope pectoralis (A)
- Chinese rubythroat, Calliope tschebaiewi (A)
- White-tailed robin, Myiomela leucura (A)
- Red-flanked bluetail, Tarsiger cyanurus
- Yellow-rumped flycatcher, Ficedula zanthopygia
- Green-backed flycatcher, Ficedula elisae (A)
- Narcissus flycatcher, Ficedula narcissina
- Ryukyu flycatcher, Ficedula owstoni
- Mugimaki flycatcher, Ficedula mugimaki
- Taiga flycatcher, Ficedula albicilla (A)
- Red-breasted flycatcher, Ficedula parva (A)
- European pied flycatcher, Ficedula hypoleuca (A)
- Blue-fronted redstart, Phoenicurus frontalis (A)
- Plumbeous redstart, Phoenicurus fuliginosus (A)
- Rufous-backed redstart, Phoenicurus erythronotus (A)
- Common redstart, Phoenicurus phoenicurus (A)
- Black redstart, Phoenicurus ochruros (A)
- Daurian redstart, Phoenicurus auroreus
- White-throated rock-thrush, Monticola gularis (A)
- Blue rock-thrush, Monticola solitarius
- Whinchat, Saxicola rubetra (A)
- Amur stonechat, Saxicola stejnegeri
- Pied bushchat, Saxicola caprata (A)
- Gray bushchat, Saxicola ferreus (A)
- Northern wheatear, Oenanthe oenanthe (A)
- Isabelline wheatear, Oenanthe isabellina (A)
- Desert wheatear, Oenanthe deserti (A)
- Eastern black-eared wheatear, Oenanthe melanoleuca (A)
- Pied wheatear, Oenanthe pleschanka (A)

== Waxwings ==
Order: Passeriformes Family: Bombycillidae

The waxwings are a group of birds with soft silky plumage and unique red tips to some of the wing feathers. In the Bohemian and cedar waxwings, these tips look like sealing wax and give the group its name. These are arboreal birds of northern forests.

- Bohemian waxwing, Bombycilla garrulus
- Japanese waxwing, Bombycilla japonica

== Weavers and allies ==
Order: Passeriformes Family: Ploceidae

Weavers are a group of small passerine birds related to the finches. These are seed-eating birds with rounded conical bills, most of which breed in sub-Saharan Africa, with fewer species in tropical Asia. Weavers get their name from the large woven nests many species make. They are gregarious birds which often breed colonially.

- Lesser masked-weaver, Ploceus intermedius (I)
- Northern red bishop, Euplectes franciscanus (I)

== Waxbills and allies ==
Order: Passeriformes Family: Estrildidae

The estrildid finches are small passerine birds of the Old World tropics and Australasia. They are gregarious and often colonial seed eaters with short thick but pointed bills. They are all similar in structure and habits, but have a wide variation in plumage colors and patterns.

- Java sparrow, Padda oryzivora (I)
- Scaly-breasted munia, Lonchura punctulata (I)
- White-rumped munia, Lonchura striata (I)
- Chestnut munia, Lonchura atricapilla (I)
- White-headed munia, Lonchura maja (I)
- Orange-cheeked waxbill, Estrilda melpoda (I)
- Black-rumped waxbill, Estrilda troglodytes (I)
- Red avadavat, Amandava amandava (I)

== Indigobirds ==
Order: Passeriformes Family: Viduidae

The Viduidae is a family of small passerine birds native to Africa that includes indigobirds and whydahs. All species are brood parasites which lay their eggs in the nests of estrildid finches. Species usually have black or indigo predominating in their plumage.

- Pin-tailed whydah, Vidua macroura (I)
- Eastern paradise-whydah, Vidua paradisaea (I)

== Accentors ==
Order: Passeriformes Family: Prunellidae

The accentors are in the only bird family, Prunellidae, which is completely endemic to the Palearctic. They are small, fairly drab species superficially similar to sparrows.

- Alpine accentor, Prunella collaris
- Siberian accentor, Prunella montanella (A)
- Japanese accentor, Prunella rubida

== Old World sparrows ==
Order: Passeriformes Family: Passeridae

Old World sparrows are small passerine birds. In general, sparrows tend to be small, plump, brown or gray birds with short tails and short powerful beaks. Sparrows are seed eaters, but they also consume small insects.

- House sparrow, Passer domesticus (A)
- Russet sparrow, Passer cinnamomeus
- Eurasian tree sparrow, Passer montanus

== Wagtails and pipits ==
Order: Passeriformes Family: Motacillidae

Motacillidae is a family of small passerine birds with medium to long tails. They include the wagtails, longclaws and pipits. They are slender, ground feeding insectivores of open country.

- Forest wagtail, Dendronanthus indicus (A)
- Gray wagtail, Motacilla cinerea
- Western yellow wagtail, Motacilla flava (A)
- Eastern yellow wagtail, Motacilla tschutschensis
- Citrine wagtail, Motacilla citreola (A)
- Japanese wagtail, Motacilla grandis
- White wagtail, Motacilla alba
- Richard's pipit, Anthus richardi
- Blyth's pipit, Anthus godlewskii (A)
- Meadow pipit, Anthus pratensis (A)
- Rosy pipit, Anthus roseatus (A)
- Tree pipit, Anthus trivialis (A)
- Olive-backed pipit, Anthus hodgsoni
- Pechora pipit, Anthus gustavi (A)
- Red-throated pipit, Anthus cervinus
- Water pipit, Anthus spinoletta (A)
- Siberian pipit, Anthus japonicus

== Finches, euphonias, and allies ==
Order: Passeriformes Family: Fringillidae

Finches are seed-eating passerine birds, that are small to moderately large and have a strong beak, usually conical and in some species very large. All have twelve tail feathers and nine primaries. These birds have a bouncing flight with alternating bouts of flapping and gliding on closed wings, and most sing well.

- Common chaffinch, Fringilla coelebs (A)
- Brambling, Fringilla montifringilla
- Hawfinch, Coccothraustes coccothraustes
- Yellow-billed grosbeak, Eophona migratoria
- Japanese grosbeak, Eophona personata
- Common rosefinch, Carpodacus erythrinus (A)
- Bonin grosbeak, Carpodacus ferreorostris (E) extinct
- Long-tailed rosefinch, Carpodacus sibiricus
- Pallas's rosefinch, Carpodacus roseus
- Pine grosbeak, Pinicola enucleator
- Eurasian bullfinch, Pyrrhula pyrrhula
- Asian rosy-finch, Leucosticte arctoa
- Oriental greenfinch, Chloris sinica
- Common redpoll, Acanthis flammea
- Hoary redpoll, Acanthis hornemanni (A)
- Red crossbill, Loxia curvirostra
- White-winged crossbill, Loxia leucoptera (A)
- Eurasian siskin, Spinus spinus

== Longspurs and snow buntings ==
Order: Passeriformes Family: Calcariidae

The Calcariidae are a group of passerine birds that had been traditionally grouped with the New World sparrows, but differ in a number of respects and are usually found in open grassy areas.

- Lapland longspur, Calcarius lapponicus
- Snow bunting, Plectrophenax nivalis

== Old World buntings ==
Order: Passeriformes Family: Emberizidae

The emberizids are a large family of seed-eating birds with distinctively shaped bills. Many emberizid species have distinctive head patterns.

- Crested bunting, Emberiza lathami (A)
- Black-headed bunting, Emberiza melanocephala (A)
- Red-headed bunting, Emberiza bruniceps (A)
- Chestnut-eared bunting, Emberiza fucata
- Meadow bunting, Emberiza cioides
- Yellowhammer, Emberiza citrinella (A)
- Pine bunting, Emberiza leucocephalos
- Gray-necked bunting, Emberiza buchanani (A)
- Ortolan bunting, Emberiza hortulana (A)
- Yellow-throated bunting, Emberiza elegans
- Ochre-rumped bunting, Emberiza yessoensis
- Pallas's bunting, Emberiza pallasi (A)
- Reed bunting, Emberiza schoeniclus
- Yellow-breasted bunting, Emberiza aureola
- Little bunting, Emberiza pusilla
- Rustic bunting, Emberiza rustica
- Yellow bunting, Emberiza sulphurata
- Masked bunting, Emberiza personata
- Chestnut bunting, Emberiza rutila
- Yellow-browed bunting, Emberiza chrysophrys
- Tristram's bunting, Emberiza tristrami
- Gray bunting, Emberiza variabilis

== New World sparrows ==
Order: Passeriformes Family: Passerellidae

Until 2017, these species were considered part of the family Emberizidae. Most of the species are known as sparrows, but these birds are not closely related to the Old World sparrows which are in the family Passeridae. Many of these have distinctive head patterns.

- Fox sparrow, Passerella iliaca (A)
- White-crowned sparrow, Zonotrichia leucophrys (A)
- Golden-crowned sparrow, Zonotrichia atricapilla (A)
- Savannah sparrow, Passerculus sandwichensis (A)
- Song sparrow, Melospiza melodia (A)

== New World warblers ==
Order: Passeriformes Family: Parulidae

The New World warblers are a group of small often colorful passerine birds restricted to the New World. Most are arboreal, but some are more terrestrial. Most members of this family are insectivores.

- Common yellowthroat, Geothlypis trichas (A)
- Yellow warbler, Setophaga petechia (A)
- Yellow-rumped warbler, Setophaga coronata (A)
- Wilson's warbler, Cardellina pusilla (A)

== Tanagers and allies ==
Order: Passeriformes Family: Thraupidae

The tanagers are a large group of small to medium-sized passerine birds restricted to the New World, mainly in the tropics. Many species are brightly colored. They are seed eaters, but their preference tends towards fruit and nectar.

- Red-crested cardinal, Paroaria coronata (I)

== See also ==
- Lists of birds by region
- List of animals in Japan
