= List of Important Bird Areas in Japan =

This list of Important Bird Areas in Japan details the 7 Endemic Bird Areas (固有鳥類生息地域, Koyū chōrui seisoku chiiki) (EBAs) and 194 Important Bird and Biodiversity Areas (重要野鳥生息地, Jōyō yachō seisoku-chi) (IBAs), including 69 Marine IBAs, identified by BirdLife International and its domestic partner the Wild Bird Society of Japan as of April 2022.

== Endemic Bird Areas ==
Name	Prefecture	Altitude	Area	Restricted-range species	Image	Coords.	Code	Ref.
Izu Islands 伊豆諸島; Izu shotō	Tokyo	0–800 metres (0–2,625 ft)	300 square kilometres (120 sq mi)	Japanese wood pigeon, Japanese night heron, Ijima's leaf warbler, Izu thrush (Columba janthina, Gorsachius goisagi, Phylloscopus ijimae, Turdus celaenops)		34°44′N 139°24′E	146	
Ogasawara Islands 小笠原諸島; Ogasawara shotō	Tokyo	0–400 metres (0–1,312 ft)	73 square kilometres (28 sq mi)	Bonin white-eye, Bonin grosbeak, Japanese wood pigeon, Bonin wood pigeon, Bonin thrush (Apalopteron familiare, Carpodacus ferreorostris, Columba janthina, Columba versicolor, Zoothera terrestris)		26°59′N 142°13′E	147	
Nansei Shoto 南西諸島; Nansei shotō	Kagoshima, Okinawa	0–1,900 metres (0–6,234 ft)	4,500 square kilometres (1,700 sq mi)	Japanese wood pigeon, Ryukyu wood pigeon, Okinawa woodpecker, Amami jay, Okinawa rail, Ryukyu robin, Ryukyu scops owl, Ryukyu minivet, Amami woodcock, Ryukyu kingfisher, Ryukyu green pigeon, Amami thrush (Columba janthina, Columba jouyi, Dendrocopos noguchii, Garrulus lidthi, Hypotaenidia okinawae, Larvivora komadori, Otus elegans, Pericrocotus tegimae, Scolopax mira, Todiramphus cinnamominus, Treron formosae, Zoothera major)		30°20′N 130°31′E	148	

=== Secondary areas ===
Name	Prefecture	Altitude	Area	Restricted-range species	Image	Coords.	Code	Ref.
Central Honshu lowland forests 本州中部低地林; Honshū chūbu teichi-rin				Japanese night heron (Gorsachius goisagi)			s089	
Central Honshu montane forests 本州中部山岳林; Honshū chūbu sangaku-rin				Yellow bunting (Emberiza sulphurata)			s090	
Iwo Islands 硫黄列島; Iō rettō	Tokyo			Japanese wood pigeon (Columba janthina)			s091	
Japanese and Korean offshore islands 日本・韓国の離島; Nihon・Kankoku no ritō				Japanese wood pigeon (Columba janthina)			s092	

== Important Bird Areas ==
Name	Prefecture	Municipality	Altitude	Area	Criteria	Trigger species	Image	Coords.	Code	Ref.
Rishiri island 利尻島; Rishiri-tō	Hokkaidō	Rishiri, Rishirifuji	0–1,700 metres (0–5,577 ft)	17,544 hectares (43,350 acres)	A3, A4i	Black-tailed gull, Japanese robin (Larus crassirostris, Larvivora akahige)		45°10′N 141°14′E	JP001	
Lake Koetoi-Onuma 声問大沼; Koetoi-ōnuma	Hokkaidō	Wakkanai	0–5 metres (0–16 ft)	830 hectares (2,100 acres)	A4i	Tundra swan (Cygnus columbianus)		45°22′N 141°45′E	JP002	
Sarobetsu marsh サロベツ原野; Sarobetsu-genya	Hokkaidō	Horonobe, Teshio, Toyotomi, Wakkanai	0–10 metres (0–33 ft)	15,000 hectares (37,000 acres)	A4i	Bean goose (Anser fabalis)		45°06′N 141°41′E	JP003	
Lake Kuccharo クッチャロ湖; Kutcharo-ko	Hokkaidō	Hamatonbetsu	0–5 metres (0–16 ft)	2,803 hectares (6,930 acres)	A4i, A4iii	Tundra swan (Cygnus columbianus)		45°08′N 142°18′E	JP004	
Esashi, Menashidomari 枝幸・目梨泊; Esashi・Menashidomari	Hokkaidō	Esashi	0–15 metres (0–49 ft)	5 hectares (12 acres)	A4i	Black-tailed gull (Larus crassirostris)		45°02′N 142°31′E	JP005	
Teuri Island 天売島; Teuri-tō	Hokkaidō	Haboro	0–85 metres (0–279 ft)	546 hectares (1,350 acres)	A4i, A4ii, A4iii	Rhinoceros auklet, Black-tailed gull, Slaty-backed gull (Cerorhinca monocerata, Larus crassirostris, Larus schistisagus)		44°25′N 141°19′E	JP006	
Lakes Komuke and Shibunotsunai コムケ湖・シブノツナイ湖; Komuke-ko・Shibunotsunai-ko	Hokkaidō	Monbetsu, Yūbetsu	0–5 metres (0–16 ft)	1,516 hectares (3,750 acres)	A4i	Northern pintail, Red-necked stint, Eurasian wigeon, Eurasian whimbrel (Anas acuta, Calidris ruficollis, Mareca penelope, Numenius phaeopus)		44°15′N 143°31′E	JP007	
Lakes Notoro and Abashiri 能取湖・網走湖; Notoro-ko・Abashiri-ko	Hokkaidō	Abashiri, Ōzora	0–10 metres (0–33 ft)	16,000 hectares (40,000 acres)	A1, A3, A4i	Latham's snipe, Red-crowned crane, Grey-tailed tattler (Gallinago hardwickii, Grus japonensis, Tringa brevipes)		44°03′N 144°10′E	JP008	
Abukuma River 阿武隈川; Abukuma-gawa	Fukushima	Date, Fukushima	0–420 metres (0–1,378 ft)	660 hectares (1,600 acres)	A4i	Northern pintail (Anas acuta)		37°46′N 140°30′E	JP065	

== See also ==
- List of birds of Japan
- List of endemic birds of Japan
- List of Ramsar sites in Japan
- Yamashina Institute for Ornithology
