= List of endemic birds of Japan =

This article is one of a series providing information about endemism among birds in the world's various zoogeographic zones. For an overview of this subject see Endemism in birds.

== Patterns of endemism ==
Japan has no endemic families. It has one endemic genus: Apalopteron, which contains the Bonin white-eye. The extinct Bonin grosbeak was formerly considered the only member of the genus Chaunoproctus, but taxonomic analysis supports it as being a basal member of the rosefinch genus Carpodacus.

== Endemic Bird Areas ==
Birdlife International has defined the following Endemic Bird Areas (EBAs) in Japan:

- Izu Islands
- Ogasawara Islands
- Nansei Shoto

The following have been designated as secondary areas:

- Central Honshu lowland forests
- Central Honshu montane forests
- Iwo Islands
- Other islands

== List of species ==
The following is a list of bird species endemic to Japan:

=== Resident endemics ===
Common name	Binomial	Family	Distribution	Status	Notes
Copper pheasant	Syrmaticus soemmerringii	Phasianidae	Honshu, Kyushu, and Shikoku		
Green pheasant	Phasianus versicolor	Phasianidae	Honshu, Kyushu, and Shikoku		Introduced to Hawaii. National bird of Japan.
Japanese woodpecker	Picus awokera	Picidae	Honshu and Kyushu		
Okinawa woodpecker	Dendrocopos noguchii	Picidae	Okinawa		
Amami woodpecker	Dendrocopos (leucotos) owstoni	Picidae	Amami Ōshima		Generally considered a subspecies of the white-backed woodpecker, but some consider it distinct.
Bonin wood pigeon	Columba versicolor	Columbidae	Nakodo-jima and Chichi-jima in the Bonin Islands		Last seen in 1889.
Ryukyu wood pigeon	Columba jouyi	Columbidae	Various islets throughout the Ryukyu Islands		Last reliably seen in 1936.
Ryukyu green pigeon	Treron permagnus permagnus/medioximus	Columbidae	Permagnus: Yakushima, Amami-Oshima, Okinawa Medioximus: Ishigaki, Iriomote, Yonaguni		
Okinawa rail	Gallirallus okinawae	Rallidae	Okinawa		
Amami woodcock	Scolopax mira	Scolopacidae	Amami Oshima, Okinawa and Tokunoshima		
Lidth's jay	Garrulus lidthi	Corvidae	Amami Ōshima and Tokunoshima		
Ryukyu minivet	Pericrocotus tegimae	Campephagidae	Formerly the Ryukyu Islands, though have recently self-colonized Kyushu, Shikoku, and Honshu		
Owston's tit	Sittiparus owstoni	Paridae	Miyakejima, Mikurajima and Hachijojima		
Iriomote tit	Sittiparus olivaceus	Paridae	Yaeyama Islands		
Bonin thrush	Zoothera terrestris	Turdidae	Chichijima in the Ogasawara Islands		Last seen in 1828.
Izu thrush	Turdus celaenops	Turdidae	Izu and Tokara Islands		
Izu robin	Larvivora (akahige) tanensis	Muscicapidae	Izu Islands		Generally considered a subspecies of the Japanese robin, but some consider it distinct.
Ryukyu robin	Larvivora komadori	Muscicapidae	Tokara Islands, Tanegashima, Okinoerabujima, Tokunoshima		
Okinawa robin	Larvivora namiyei	Muscicapidae	Okinawa		
Ryukyu flycatcher	Ficedula owstoni	Muscicapidae	Ryukyu Islands		
Bonin white-eye	Apalopteron familiare	Zosteropidae	Hahajima formerly throughout Bonin		
Bonin grosbeak	Carpodacus ferreorostris	Fringillidae	Chichijima in the Ogasawara Islands		Last reported in 1828.
Bonin greenfinch	Chloris kittlitzi	Fringillidae	Hahajima and South Iwo Jima		

=== Breeding endemics ===
Common name	Binomial	Family	Distribution	Status	Notes
Matsudaira's storm-petrel	Oceanodroma matsudairae	Hydrobatidae	Volcano Islands (breeding), Indian Ocean (wintering)		
Short-tailed albatross	Phoebastria albatrus	Diomedeidae	Senkaku Islands, Muko-jima, and Tori-shima (breeding), broader Pacific Ocean (wintering). Extirpated as a breeder on most of the other Bonin Islands as well as the non-Japanese Marshall Islands. Also formerly bred on Bermuda in prehistoric times.		
Bryan's shearwater	Puffinus bryani	Procellaridae	Bonin Islands (breeding), Pacific Ocean around the Hawaiian Islands (wintering).		
Bannerman's shearwater	Puffinus bannermani	Procellaridae	Volcano Islands (breeding), Pacific Ocean around Ogasawara Group (wintering)		
Ijima's leaf-warbler	Phylloscopus ijimae	Phylloscopidae	Izu Islands and Tokara Islands (breeding), Honshu, Kyushu, Nansei-shoto, the Philippines, and Taiwan (wintering)		
Japanese leaf warbler	Phylloscopus xanthodryas	Phylloscopidae	All of Japan except Hokkaido (breeding), Taiwan and Southeast Asia (wintering)		
Yellow bunting	Emberiza sulphurata	Emberizidae	Northern Japan barring Hokkaido (breeding), southern Japan, Taiwan, and the Philippines (wintering)		
