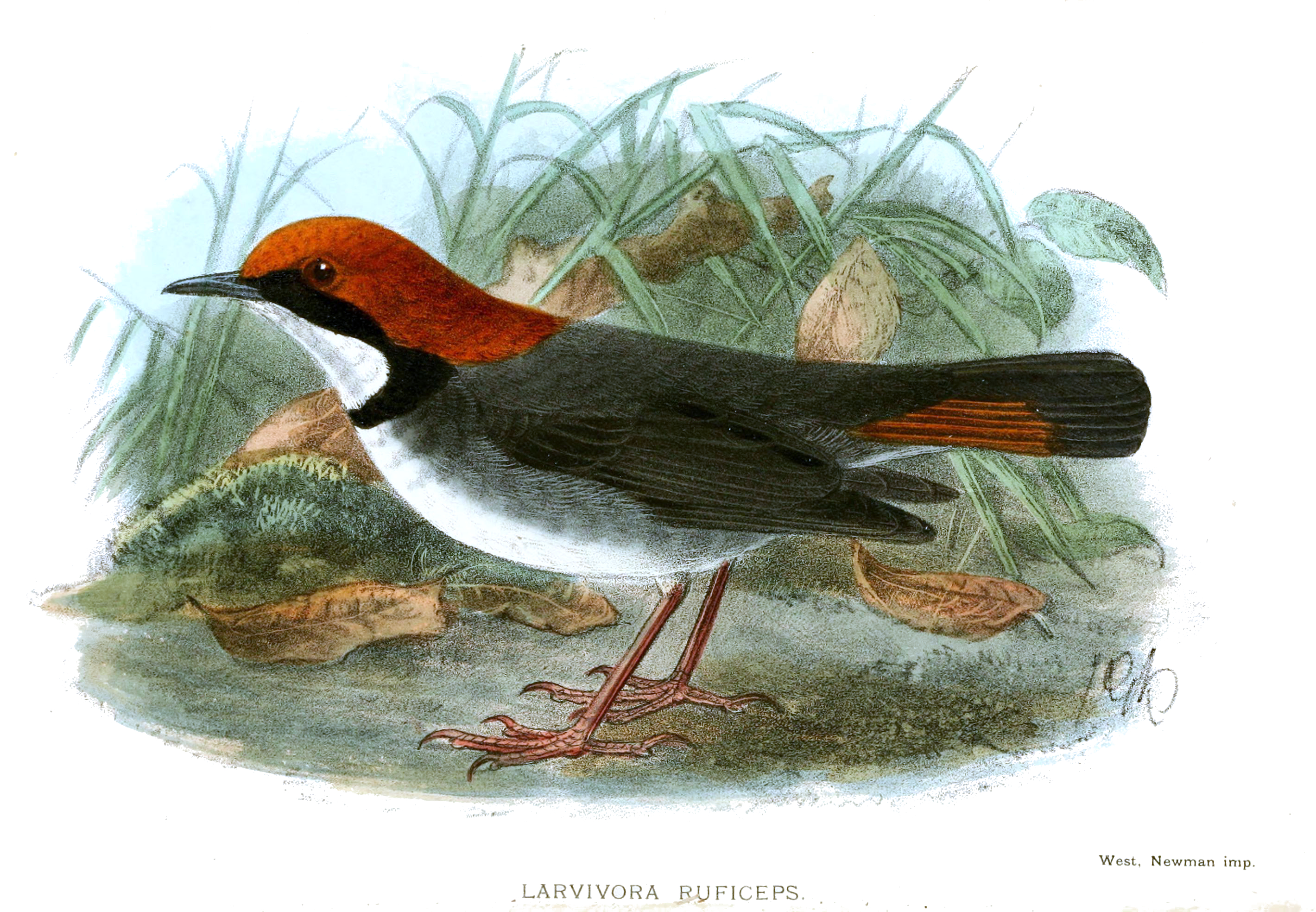

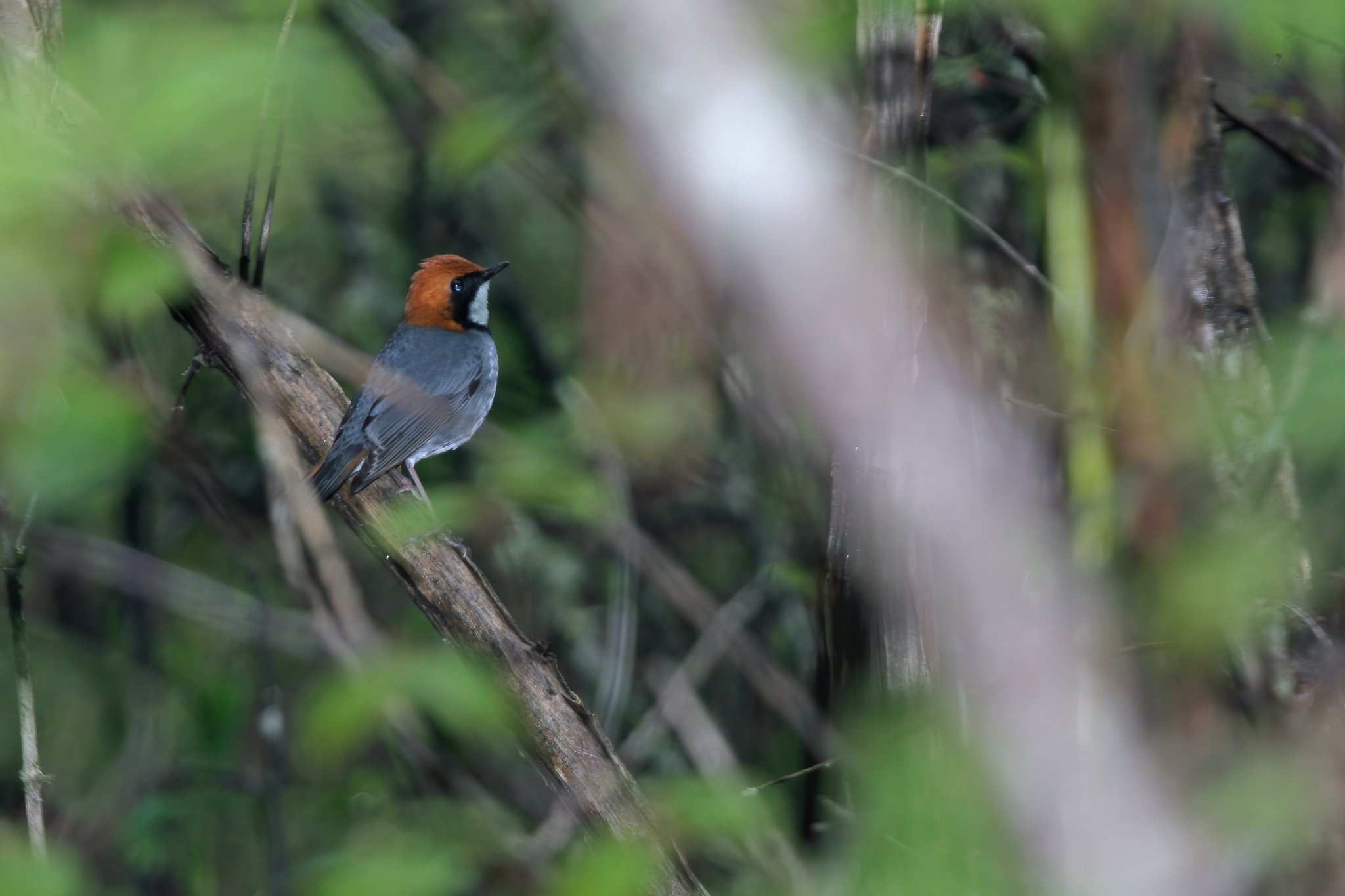

Conservation status
- Endangered (IUCN 3.1)

Scientific classification
- Kingdom: Animalia
- Phylum: Chordata
- Class: Aves
- Order: Passeriformes
- Family: Muscicapidae
- Genus: Larvivora
- Species: L. ruficeps

Binomial name
- Larvivora ruficeps Hartert, 1907

Synonyms
- Luscinia ruficeps

= Rufous-headed robin =

Species of bird

The rufous-headed robin (Larvivora ruficeps) is a species of passerine bird in the family Muscicapidae. It is found in central China. Its natural habitats are temperate forests and temperate shrubland. This poorly known species is thought to be threatened by habitat loss.

== Taxonomy ==
The rufous-headed robin was previously placed in the genus Luscinia. A molecular phylogenetic study published in 2010 found that Luscinia was not monophyletic. The genus was therefore split and several species including rufous-headed robin were moved to the reinstated genus Larvivora.

Within the genus Larvivora the rufous-headed robin is genetically most closely related to the rufous-tailed robin (Larvivora sibilans). These two species form a sister group to a clade comprising the Japanese robin (Larvivora akahige) and the Ryukyu robin (Larvivora komadori).

== Description ==
This is a small robin (average length 15 cm) with an orange-rufous head, a black face, and a white throat with black bordering. Back, upper breast and flanks are grey, most of the belly and underparts are white. The tail is black with rufous fringes and blackish tips to the outer feathers. The song is powerful and clearly phrased, and most similar to that of the Ryukyu robin.

== Distribution and habitat ==
The species has been recorded from only seven confirmed or probable breeding sites in the Qin Mountains of Sichuan and southern Shaanxi, and is also known from a very few scattered migrant records. While good population estimates are absent, it is assumed to have a very localized distribution and a small total population size of no more than 1,500-3,800 individuals.

It inhabits mixed coniferous and deciduous forest and scrubland in a very narrow altitude band (2,400-2,800 m above sea level), apparently making use of successional scrub in valley bottom areas subject to flash-floods.

Using known breeding records of the rufous-headed robin, ecological niche modeling predicts that there should be suitable habitats for this species in north and central Sichuan, south Gansu, south Shaanxi and south-east Tibet.

== Conservation ==
Populations of the rufous-headed robin appear to be on the decline. The species was classified by the IUCN as Vulnerable until 2012 and was uplisted to Endangered in 2013, based on the rarity of recent sightings, which is taken to indicate an ongoing population decline. The main threats are believed to be habitat loss and degradation, likely exacerbated to an unknown degree by the capture of live specimens for the caged bird trade.
