= Hokkaido Seabird Center =

- 北海道海鳥センター
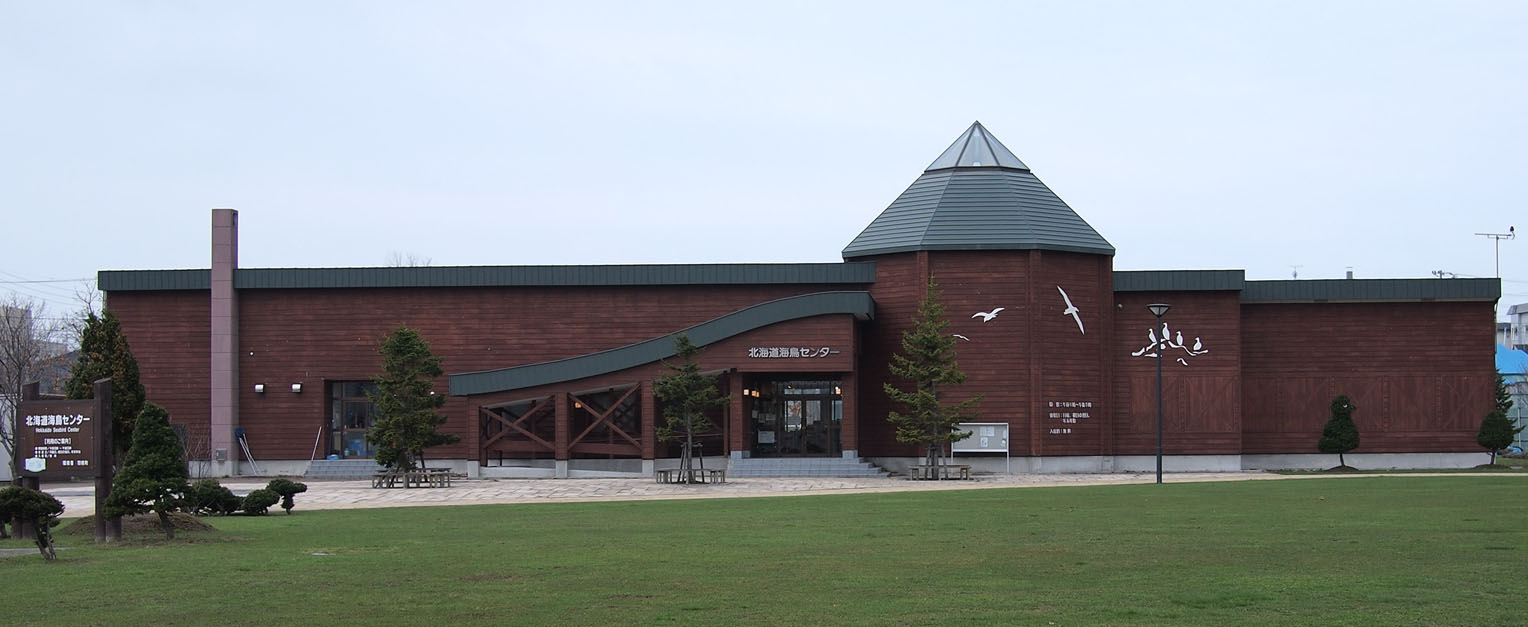
- Interactive map of the Hokkaido Seabird Center area

General information
- Location: Haboro, Hokkaido, Japan
- Coordinates: 44°21′55″N 141°42′30″E
- Opened: 1997

Website
- Official website (ja)

The Hokkaido Seabird Center (北海道海鳥センター, Hokkaidō Umidori Sentā) is a seabird research, conservation, and public engagement facility in Haboro, Hokkaido, Japan. The centre opened in 1997 and is operated by the Ministry of the Environment in conjunction with the municipality. There is a particular focus on common guillemots (Uria aalge) and Teuri Island.

== See also ==
- List of Important Bird Areas in Japan
- Ornithological Society of Japan
