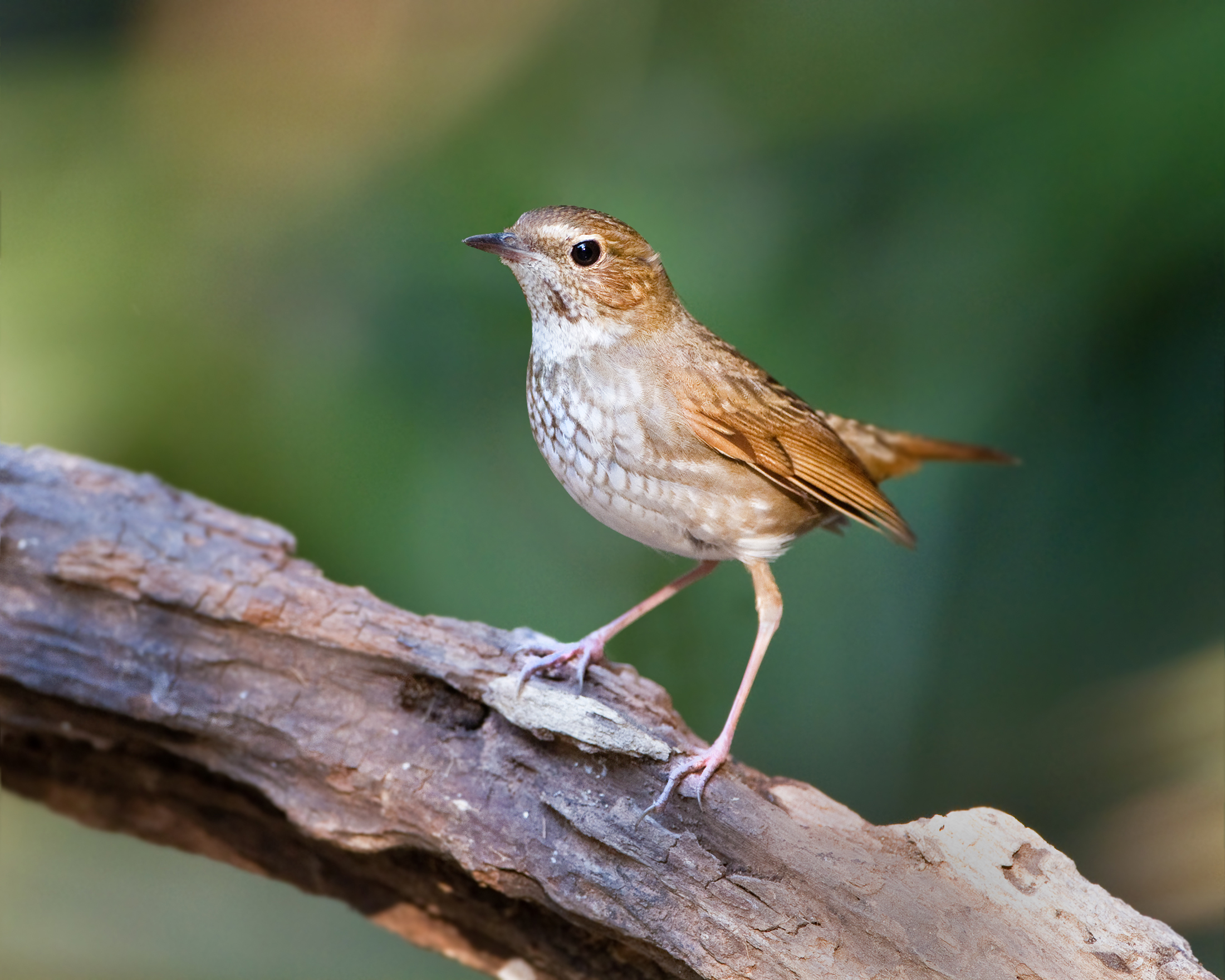
- In Khao Yai National Park, Pak Chong, Thailand

Conservation status
- Least Concern (IUCN 3.1)

Scientific classification
- Kingdom: Animalia
- Phylum: Chordata
- Class: Aves
- Order: Passeriformes
- Family: Muscicapidae
- Genus: Larvivora
- Species: L. sibilans

Binomial name
- Larvivora sibilans R. Swinhoe, 1863

Synonyms
- Erythacus sibilans Luscinia sibilans

= Rufous-tailed robin =

Species of bird

The rufous-tailed robin (Larvivora sibilans) is a small passerine bird. Its breeding range extends from southern Siberia and the Sea of Okhotsk to southern China and southeastern Asia.

It has a number of alternative English names: pseudorobin, red-tailed robin, Swinhoe's red-tailed robin, Swinhoe's robin, Swinhoe's pseudorobin, Swinhoe's nightingale or whistling nightingale.

== Taxonomy ==
The rufous-tailed robin was previously placed in the genus Luscinia. A large molecular phylogenetic study published in 2010 found that Luscinia was not monophyletic. The genus was therefore split and several species including rufous-tailed robin were moved to the reinstated genus Larvivora. The rufous-tailed robin is genetically most closely related to the rufous-headed robin (Larvivora ruficeps). These two species form a sister group to a clade containing the Japanese robin (Larvivora akahige) and the Ryukyu robin (Larvivora komadori).

The genus name Larvivora comes from the Neo-Latin larva meaning caterpillar and -vorus meaning eating (vorace to devour), and sibilans is Latin for "whistling".

== Morphology ==
The rufous-tailed robin is much the same size as the European robin at 14 cm (5.5 in) length. It is plain greyish brown above and grey to white below, with circular pale markings on its heavily mottled throat and breast. It has a bright rufous rump and tail. The flanks are buff and there is whitish ring round the eye and a pronounced buffish cheek stripe. The tip of the lower mandible is slightly upturned. The beak is brownish-black and the legs pinkish-grey. The sexes generally look alike but the females may be marginally paler. Juveniles are similar to the adults but tinged with ochre and with dark edges to the upper plumage. At first glance this bird could be confused with the American Catharus thrushes such as veery and hermit thrush.

The male rufous-tailed robin sings by day, but also by night during the breeding season. The song consists of several similar phrases, being loud cascading trills starting at a high pitch and ending lower, rather like the neigh of a horse. Calls include whistles when the bird is alarmed and a jangling "chok-chok" when the parents have young to care for.

== Distribution and habitat ==
The rufous-tailed robin is a migratory insectivorous species breeding in forests in the taiga of northeastern Asia and south to Mongolia, and wintering in Southeast Asia and southern China. It is a rare vagrant to Western Europe. The first record for this bird in Europe was on Fair Isle, Scotland in October 2004. Another was seen in Poland in January 2006. More recently, it was seen in Norfolk, England in October 2011 and again in September 2013, and in Denmark in October 2012.

It is a bird of coniferous woodlands and damp broad-leafed woodland with fallen trees and thick undergrowth, particularly spruce and fir with willow, alder, birch, poplar and bird cherry. It is mainly a lowland species but sometimes occurs at altitudes of up to 1,200 m (4,000 ft) above sea level. In its winter quarters it is found in forests, in areas with scattered trees, scrubland, parks and gardens.

== Behaviour ==
This is an elusive bird and difficult to spot as it lurks among concealing branches, remaining stationary for considerable periods. It is terrestrial in its habits and insectivorous, mainly feeding on ants, beetles, spiders and other invertebrates. It often flicks its tail in a characteristic way.

Breeding takes place in June or July. The nest is cup-shaped and is often in a hole in a tree or on a stump and usually quite near the ground. It is made from dead leaves, grasses and moss and lined with finer materials. There are usually five or six eggs, either plain pale blue or blueish-grey irregularly blotched with brown. Migration southwards starts soon after the nestlings are reared, in late August in Russia and a few weeks later in Korea. The birds arrive in the vicinity of Hong Kong in November and also overwinter in Thailand, Laos and Vietnam. In the spring they move northwards again, reaching Korea in May and Russia by early June.

== Status ==
The rufous-tailed robin is considered by the IUCN to be of least concern. This is because it has an extremely large range, appears to be quite common within that range and the population seems to be stable.
