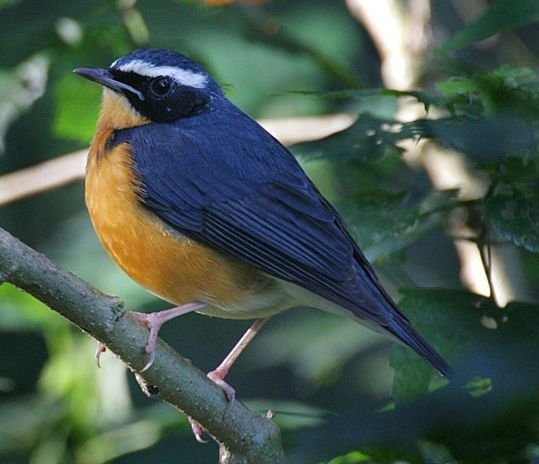
- Indian blue robin (Larvivora brunnea)

Scientific classification
- Kingdom: Animalia
- Phylum: Chordata
- Class: Aves
- Order: Passeriformes
- Family: Muscicapidae
- Subfamily: Saxicolinae
- Genus: Larvivora; Hodgson, 1837

Type species
- Larvivora cyana Hodgson, 1837

= Larvivora =

Genus of birds

Larvivora is a genus of small passerine birds belonging to the Old World flycatcher family Muscicapidae that occur in central and eastern Asia.

The species in this genus were all previously classified in other genera. A large molecular phylogenetic study published on 2010 found that the genera Luscinia and Erithacus as defined by Edward C. Dickinson in 2003 were not monophyletic. The genus Larvivora with the type species Larvivora cyane was reinstated to accommodate a well-defined clade. Although the rufous-headed robin was not included in the phylogenetic study, it was moved to the resurrected genus due to its structural, song and behavioural similarities with the Indian blue robin and the Siberian blue robin.

The genus Larvivora had been introduced by the British naturalist Brian Houghton Hodgson in 1837. Hodgson listed two species in the genus but did not specify the type. In 1840 the English zoologist George Gray designated the type as Motacilla cyane Pallas, 1776, the Siberian blue robin. The word Larvivora comes from the Neo-Latin larva meaning caterpillar and -vorus meaning eating (vorace to devour).

The genus includes the following 8 species:

- Indian blue robin, (Larvivora brunnea) (formerly in Luscinia)
- Siberian blue robin, (Larvivora cyane) (formerly in Luscinia)
- Rufous-tailed robin, (Larvivora sibilans) (formerly in Luscinia)
- Ryukyu robin, (Larvivora komadori) (formerly in Erithacus)
- Okinawa robin, (Larvivora namiyei)
- Japanese robin, (Larvivora akahige) (formerly in Erithacus)
- Izu robin (Larvivora tanensis) (split from L. akahige)
- Rufous-headed robin, (Larvivora ruficeps) (formerly in Luscinia)
