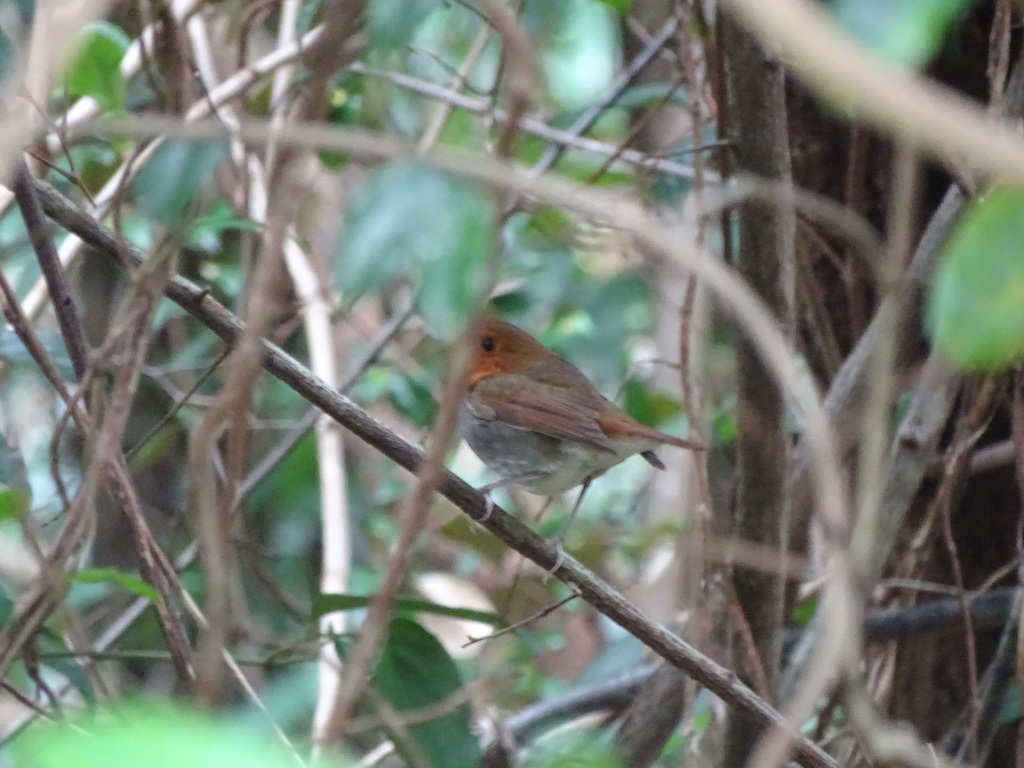

Conservation status
- Vulnerable (IUCN 3.1)

Scientific classification
- Kingdom: Animalia
- Phylum: Chordata
- Class: Aves
- Order: Passeriformes
- Family: Muscicapidae
- Genus: Larvivora
- Species: L. tanensis

Binomial name
- Larvivora tanensis (Kuroda, Nm, 1923)

= Izu robin =

Species of bird

The Izu robin (Larvivora tanensis) is a small passerine bird in the Old World flycatcher family Muscicapidae that is endemic to the Izu Islands of Japan.

The Izu robin was formerly treated as a subspecies of the Japanese robin (Larvivora akahige). It was split from the Japanese robin based mainly on the differences in vocalization.
