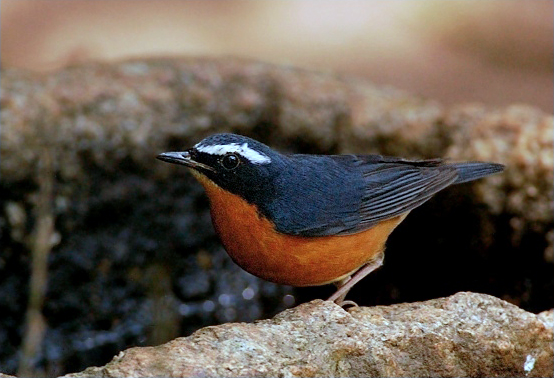

Conservation status
- Least Concern (IUCN 3.1)

Scientific classification
- Kingdom: Animalia
- Phylum: Chordata
- Class: Aves
- Order: Passeriformes
- Family: Muscicapidae
- Genus: Larvivora
- Species: L. brunnea

Binomial name
- Larvivora brunnea Hodgson, 1837
- breeding range overwintering range

Synonyms
- Erithacus brunneus Larvivora brunnea Tarsiger brunnea Larvivora wickhami Luscinia brunnea

= Indian blue robin =

Species of bird

The Indian blue robin (Larvivora brunnea) is a small bird found in the Indian subcontinent. Formerly considered a thrush, it is now considered one of the Old World flycatchers in the family Muscicapidae. It was earlier also called the Indian blue chat. It is migratory, breeding in the forests along the Himalayas of Nepal, India, Myanmar and Bangladesh. They winter in the hill forests of the Western Ghats of India and in Sri Lanka.

== Taxonomy ==
The Indian blue robin was described by Hodgson who placed it in a new genus Larvivora but it was later placed in the genus Luscinia. A large-sample molecular phylogenetic study published in 2010 found that Luscinia was not monophyletic. The genus was therefore split and several species including Indian blue robin were moved to the reinstated genus Larvivora. Larvivora is a sister of the species Brachypteryx cruralis, Brachypteryx leucophrys and Brachypteryx hyperythra.

== Description ==
The Indian blue robin is similar in size to the related bluethroat at 15 cm long. The adult male has blue upperparts and rufous underparts. A bright white supercilium contrasts with a black mask that continues down the neck. The lower belly and undertail are also whitish. The female is olive brown above and buff below with a light eye-ring and rufescent rump. The breast and flanks are buffy.

Young birds are dark brown with buff spots.

== Distribution ==
The nominate race breeds from Eastern Afghanistan to the eastern Himalayas. Race wickhami (Stuart Baker, 1916) breeds in the Chin Hills of western Myanmar and is said to be non-migratory.

== Behaviour and ecology ==
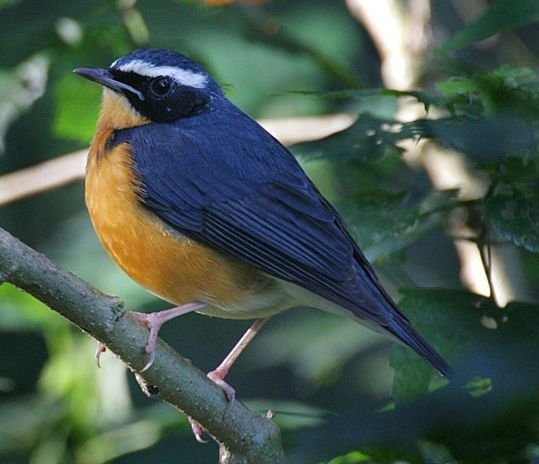
Indian blue robin, Male

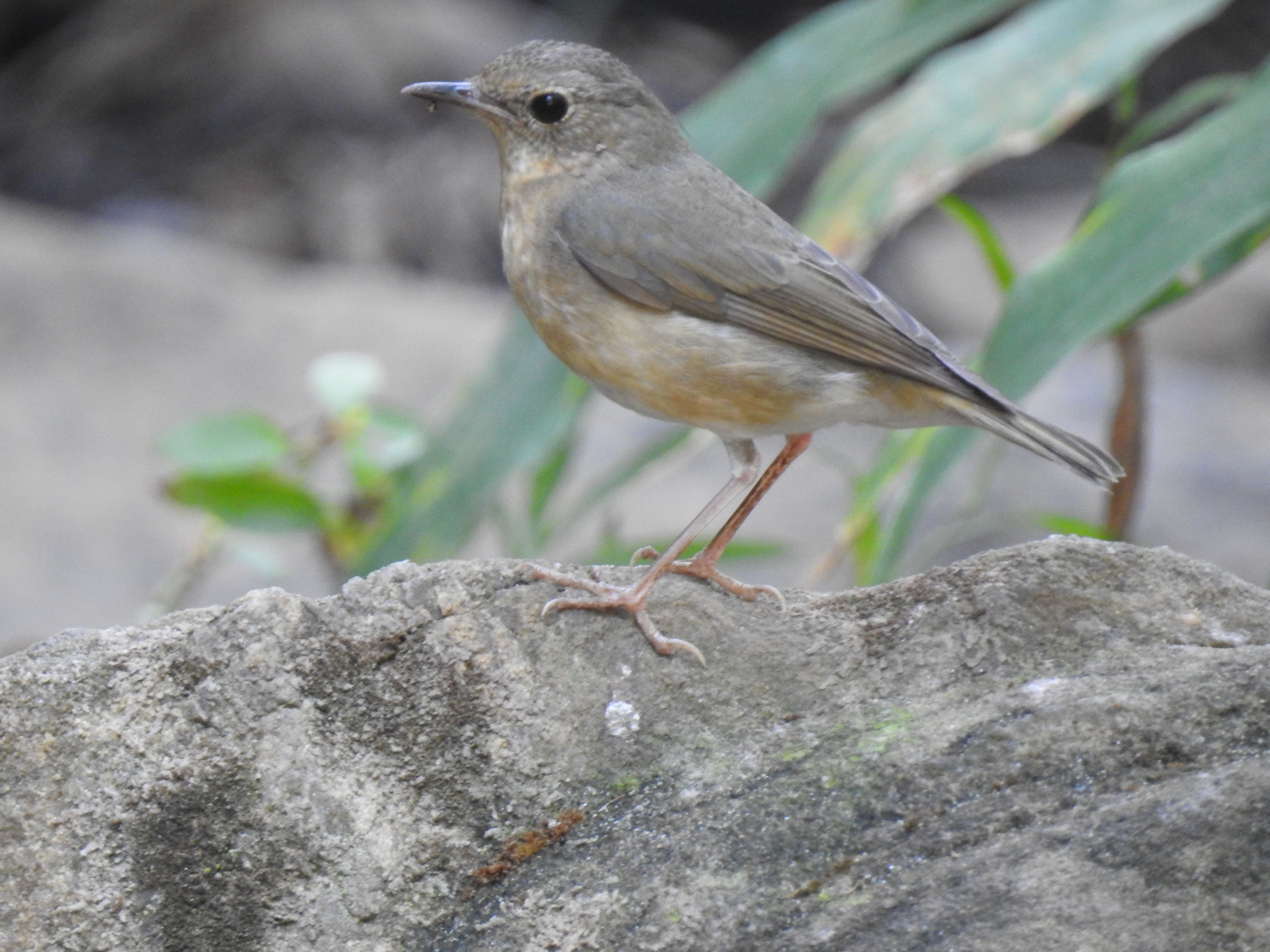
Indian blue robin, Female

The Indian blue robin is insectivorous and feeds mainly on the ground. It skulks in undergrowth and hops on the ground, frequently flicking and fanning its tail. The breeding season is May to July and the nest is a large cup of vegetation placed on the ground between the roots of large fir tree or in depression. The nest is lined with roots, hair and down. The usual clutch is 4 light blue eggs. Only the female is believed to incubate but both sexes take part feeding the young. The cuckoo Cuculus canorus has been recorded in old literature as a brood parasite of the species.

These birds arrive in the Himalayan breeding grounds in May and leave in September. Southward migration begins in August. During the migratory season they may be found as passage migrants all over peninsular India. In winter they are found mainly in the hill forests of southern India, the Western Ghats and in Sri Lanka. They arrive in mid-September and leave the winter quarters in mid-April. Males appeared to be commoner than females in a survey conducted in the Nilgiris suggesting either differences in the timing of migration of males and females or variation in wintering areas. At Point Calimere they have been regularly trapped during October and November on their return migration from Sri Lanka but rarely on the southward migration with suggestions that they may follow different routes.

The habitat in which they are found is usually dense and dark forest with undergrowth and leaf litter. They sing and call in their winter grounds. The song consists of a sudden and sharp series of whistles ending in a rapid series of notes. They also utter a sharp and low clicking alarm note.
