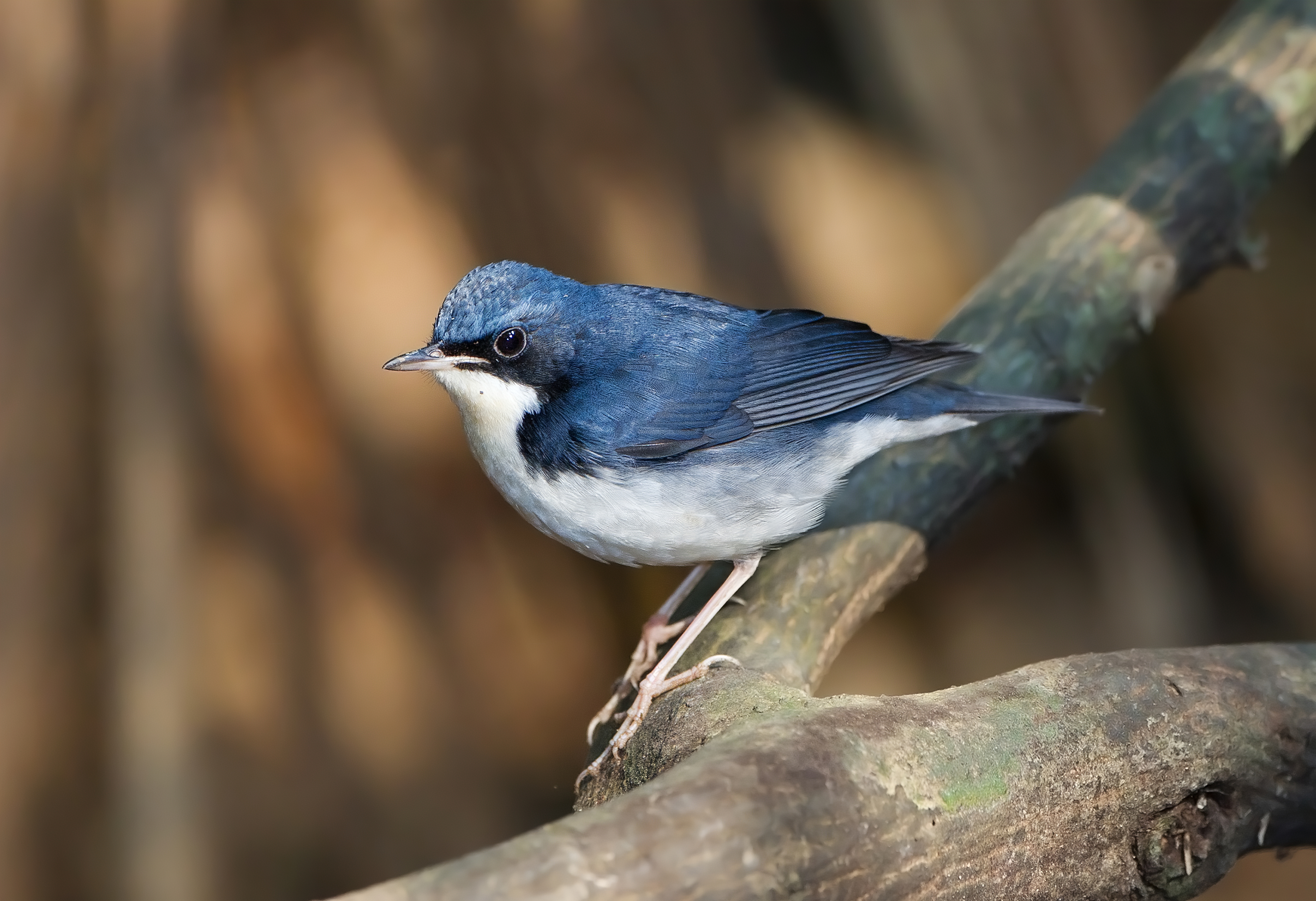
- Male
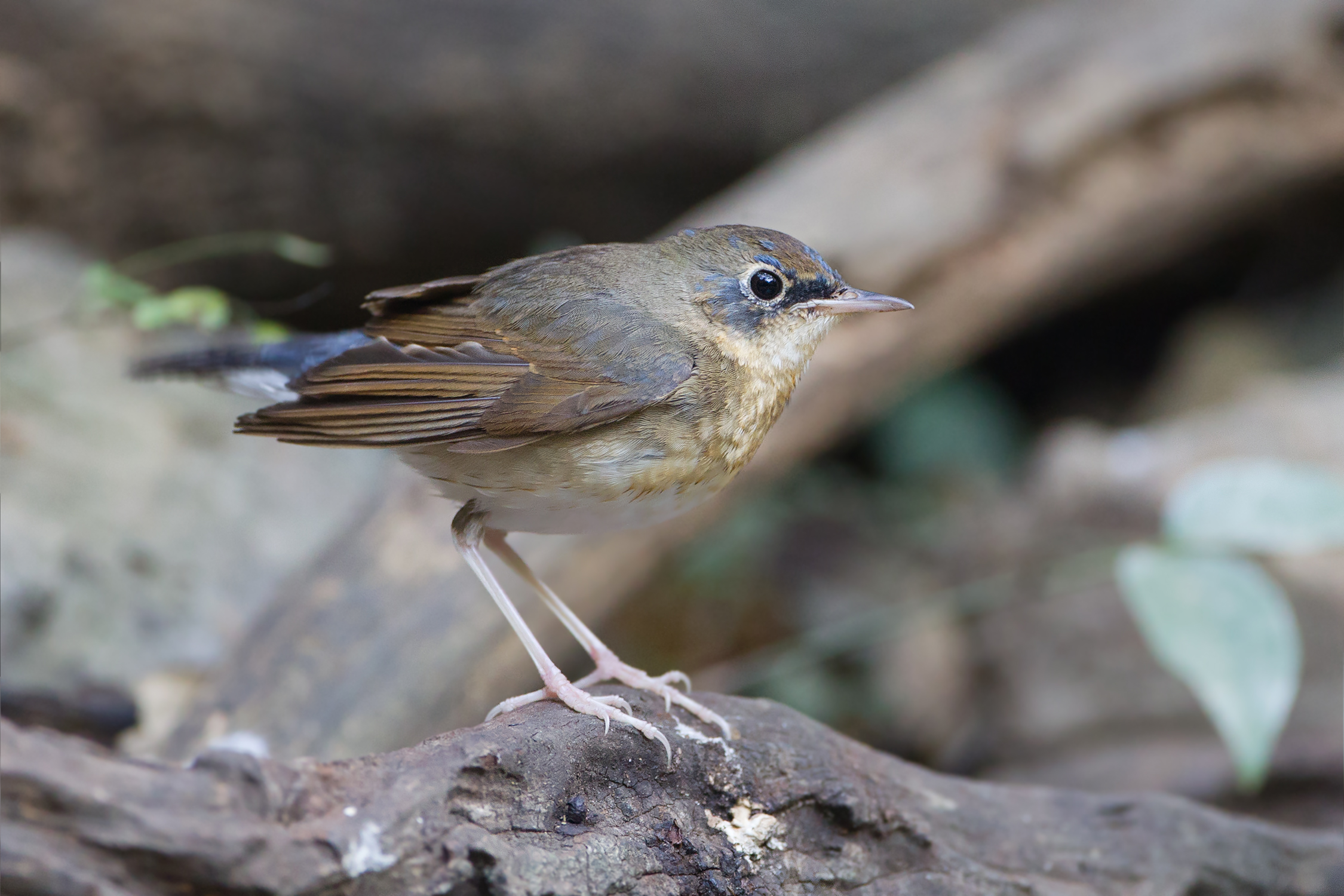
- Juvenile

Conservation status
- Least Concern (IUCN 3.1)

Scientific classification
- Kingdom: Animalia
- Phylum: Chordata
- Class: Aves
- Order: Passeriformes
- Family: Muscicapidae
- Genus: Larvivora
- Species: L. cyane

Binomial name
- Larvivora cyane (Pallas, 1776)

Synonyms
- Luscinia cyanea (lapsus); Luscinia cyane

= Siberian blue robin =

Species of bird

The Siberian blue robin (Larvivora cyane) is a small passerine bird that was formerly classified as a member of the thrush family, Turdidae, but is now more generally considered to belong to the Old World flycatcher family, Muscicapidae. It and similar small European species are often called chats. Recent research suggests that this species and some other East Asian members of Luscinia should be classified in a new genus, together with the Japanese and Ryūkyū robins. The genus name Larvivora comes from the Neo-Latin larva meaning caterpillar and -vorus meaning eating (vorace to devour), and cyane is Latin for "dark-blue".

This bird is a migratory insectivorous species breeding in the eastern Palearctic from Siberia and northern Mongolia, northeastern China, Korea and across to Japan. It winters in southern and south-eastern Asia and Indonesia.

The breeding habitat is coniferous forest with dense understory, often beside rivers or at woodland edges. It feeds on the ground but is very 'skulking'. In winter, this bird also tends to stay in dense vegetation.

This species is a very rare vagrant to Europe, and has vagrant status even as far east as Pakistan.

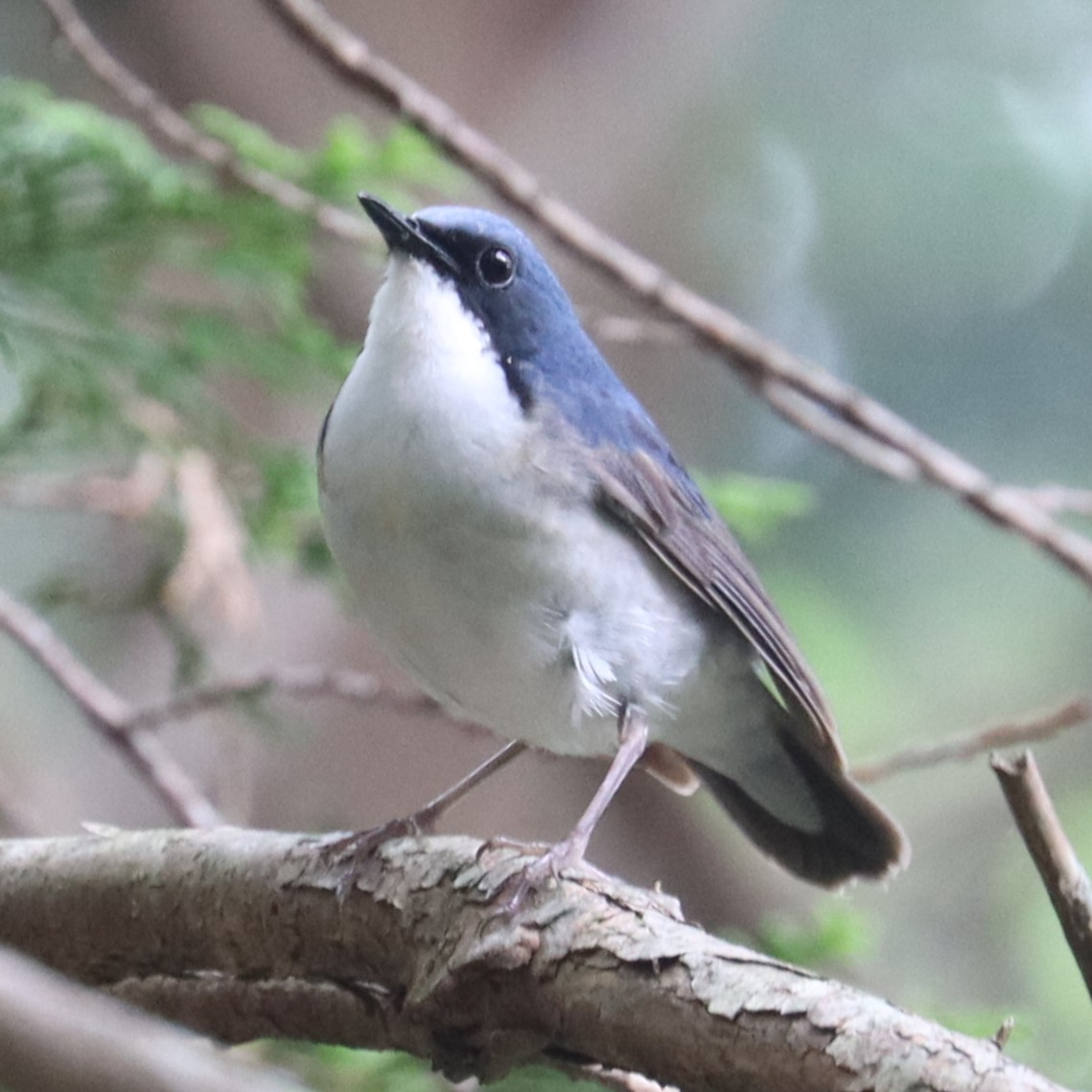
Male in Kiso Mountains, Nakatsugawa, Gifu Prefecture, Japan.

The Siberian blue robin was previously placed in the genus Luscinia. A large molecular phylogenetic study published in 2010 found that Luscinia was not monophyletic. The genus was therefore split and several species including the Siberian blue robin were moved to the reinstated genus Larvivora.
