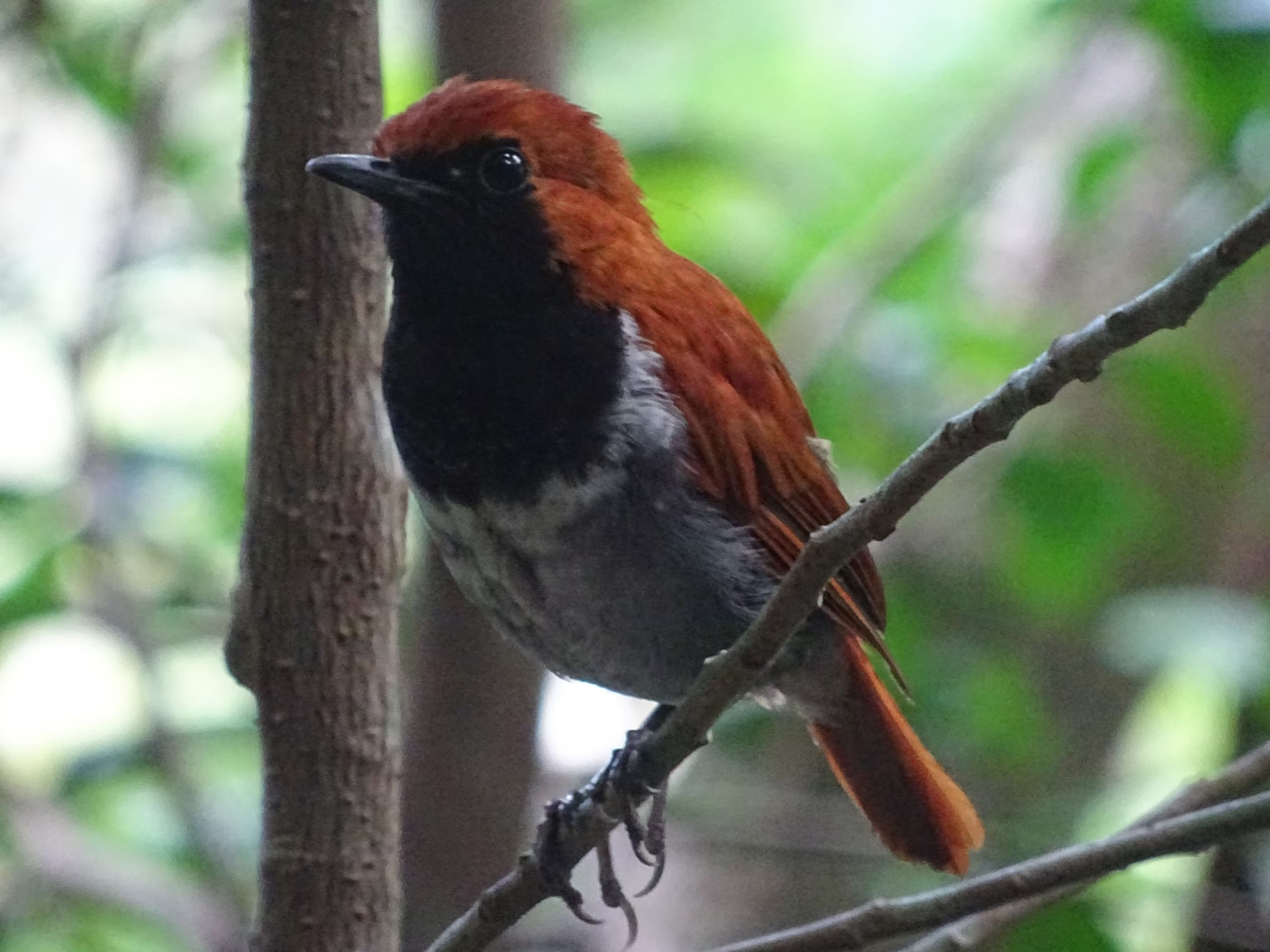

Conservation status
- Least Concern (IUCN 3.1)

Scientific classification
- Kingdom: Animalia
- Phylum: Chordata
- Class: Aves
- Order: Passeriformes
- Family: Muscicapidae
- Genus: Larvivora
- Species: L. namiyei

Binomial name
- Larvivora namiyei (Stejneger, 1887)

= Okinawa robin =

Species of bird

The Okinawa robin (Larvivora namiyei) is a passerine bird endemic to Okinawa of Japan. It previously was considered a subspecies of the Ryukyu robin (Larvivora komadori ).

== Behavior ==
Sometimes forages for food near the ground. Predation by invasive species such as the small Indian mongoose negatively impacts the Okinawa Robin.
