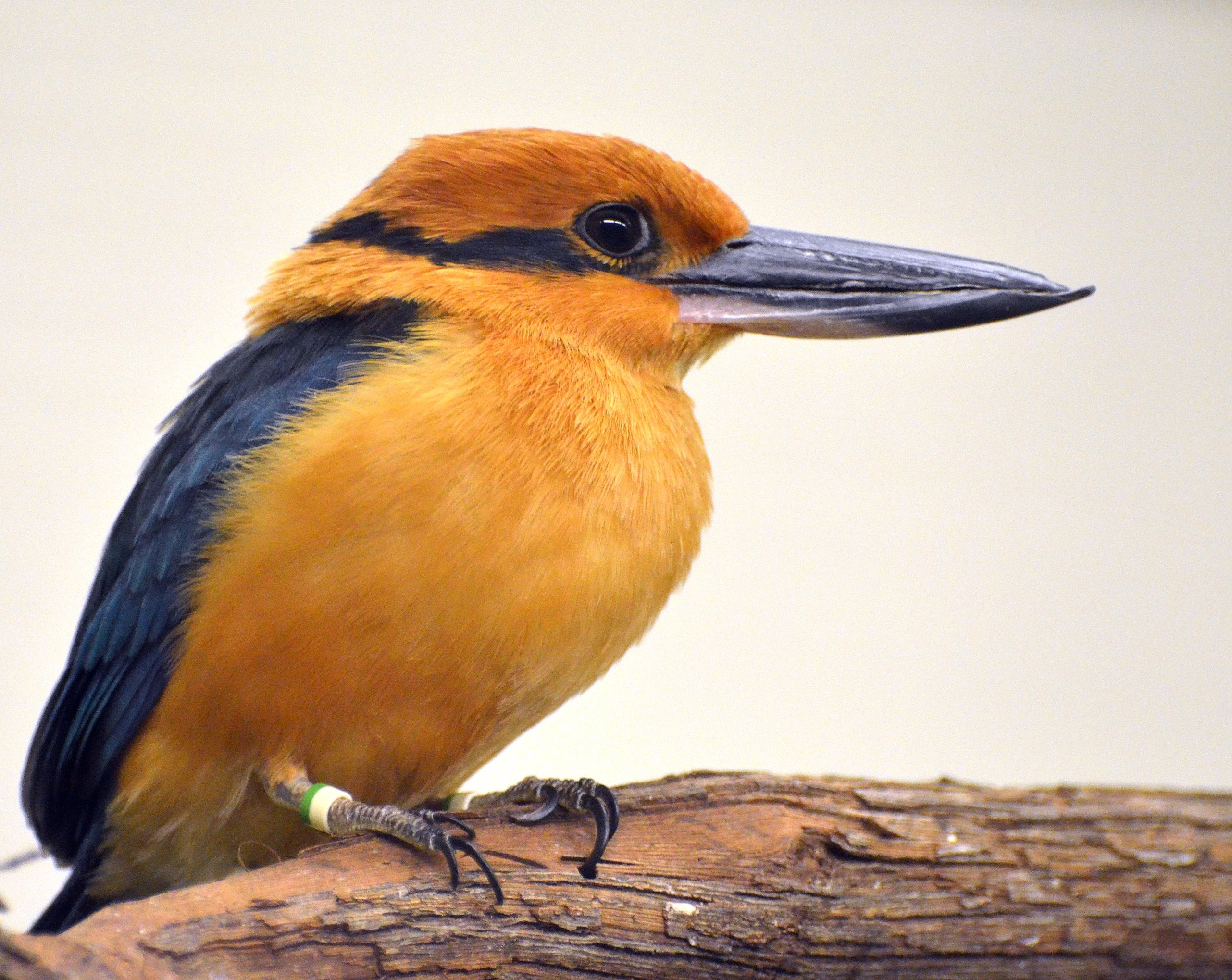
- Guam kingfisher (Todiramphus cinnamominus), of whom the Ryukyu kingfisher (T. c. miyakoensis) is expected to be a subspecies

Conservation status
- Extinct (late 19th century)

Scientific classification
- Kingdom: Animalia
- Phylum: Chordata
- Class: Aves
- Order: Coraciiformes
- Family: Alcedinidae
- Subfamily: Halcyoninae
- Genus: Todiramphus
- Species: T. cinnamominus
- Subspecies: †T. c. miyakoensis

Trinomial name
- †Todiramphus cinnamominus miyakoensis (Kuroda, 1919)

Synonyms
- Halcyon miyakoensis (protonym) Kuroda, 1919; Todiramphus miyakoensis

= Ryukyu kingfisher =

Subspecies of bird

The Ryukyu kingfisher (Todiramphus cinnamominus miyakoensis) is an enigmatic taxon of tree kingfisher. It is extinct and is only known from a single specimen. Its taxonomic status is doubtful; it is most likely a subspecies of the Guam kingfisher, which would make its scientific name Todiramphus cinnamominus miyakoensis. As the specimen is at the Yamashina Institute for Ornithology, the question could be resolved using DNA sequence analysis; at any rate, the Guam kingfisher is almost certainly the closest relative of the Ryukyu bird. The IUCN considers this bird a subspecies and has hence struck it from its redlist.

The one known bird, probably a male, was according to its label collected on Miyako-jima, the main island of the Miyako group, Ryūkyū Shotō, on February 5, 1887. While it is often and correctly stated that specimen labels may be incorrect or misleading, the locality, to the northwest of the extant populations of Todiramphus cinnamominus, seems sound in a biogeographical sense. At least the specimen labels of Ryukyu collections by later Japanese collectors are usually very reliable; whether this is true for earlier collection too is not known.

The only differences between the Miyako-jima bird and males of the Guam kingfisher (the nominate subspecies of the Micronesian kingfisher; presently only surviving in captivity) are the former's lack of a black nape band and the red feet (black in Guam birds). The bill color is unknown due to damage to the specimen, and supposed differences in the proportion of the remiges are almost certainly an artifact of specimen preparation. Indeed, the specimen was not recognized as distinct until some 30 years after its collection.

If the bird was indeed a resident of the Miyako group (and as there was better habitat on neighboring Irabu-jima, it is probable that it would have been found there too), it became extinct in the late 19th century. While this seems early, the population must have always been small as there never was much habitat available in historic times. Thorough research in the early 20th century failed to find the bird again; the reasons for the disappearance of the population likely include land clearance and draining of wetlands for agriculture.
