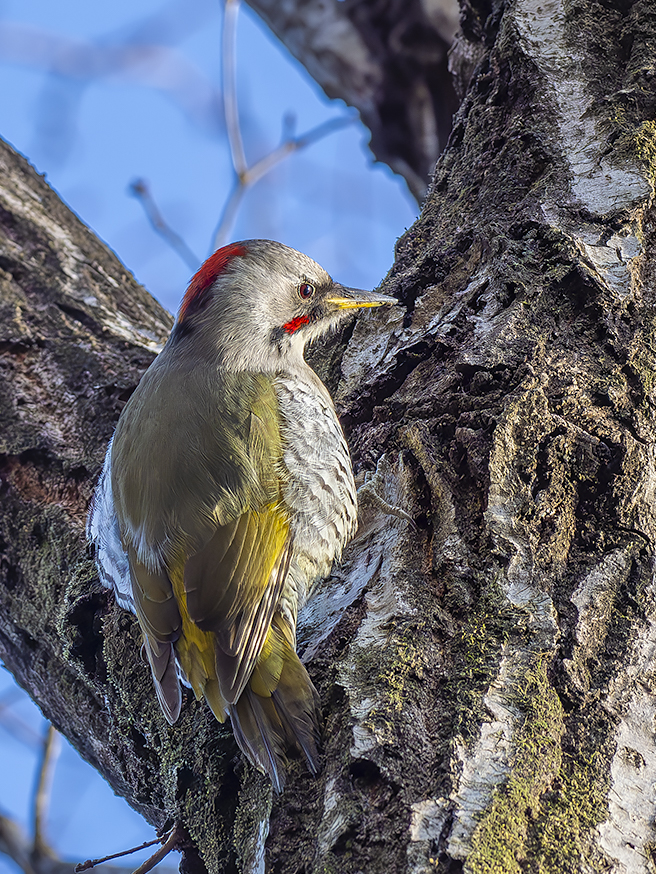
- Female, Gumma-ken, Japan

Conservation status
- Least Concern (IUCN 3.1)

Scientific classification
- Kingdom: Animalia
- Phylum: Chordata
- Class: Aves
- Order: Piciformes
- Family: Picidae
- Genus: Picus
- Species: P. awokera

Binomial name
- Picus awokera Temminck, 1836

= Japanese green woodpecker =

Species of bird

The Japanese green woodpecker or Japanese woodpecker (Picus awokera) is a medium-sized woodpecker similar and closely related to the European green woodpecker, but endemic to Japan.

== Description ==
This species reaches about 30 cm in length, with bright green wings and tail, a red or black mustache and crown (as opposed to the black face of the green woodpecker), gray head, neck, and chest, and white underparts with black markings. The bill is yellow, the legs and feet are light gray colored. The iris is red.

== Vocalizations ==
This woodpecker is loudly before and after the breeding season. Their known calls are an individually, loud and whip-crack-similar pijo, and a ket, ket with two syllables. They also drum, and these drumrolls are very fast and long.

== Distribution and habitat ==
This woodpecker is found in most big islands of Japan, and also smaller islands like Tobishima, Awashima, Sado and Tsushima. The total distribution area is as big as 281.000 km^{2}.

Japanese green woodpeckers live in the north in open mixed forests, in the south in warm-temperate evergreen forests, but also in parks and gardens. They avoid older coniferous monocultures. The species is in their occurrence limited to hilly landscapes and lower mountain regions and most frequently seen in altitudes between 300 and 1400m, sometimes it's found in lowlands or in altitudes of up to 2000m.

== Food and feeding ==
The foraging is mostly in the middle tree layer at heights between 2 and 10m on larger branches, but also on twigs, sometimes also on the ground. This species eats ants from the genera Lasius, Formica, Camponotus and Crematogaster, in addition to bugs, beetles, beetle larvae and spiders. Its menu also includes fruits, berries, seeds, resin and nectar.

== Breeding ==
Japanese green woodpeckers live in pairs. The breeding season is in April to June. They nest in cavities of trees as deep as two to four meters, and the females lay seven or eight eggs.

== Taxonomy ==
The Japanese green woodpecker is divided into at least three subspecies:

- Picus awokera awokera, the nominate subspecies, found on Honshū
- Picus awokera horii, native to Kyūshū
- Picus awokera takatsukasae, thriving in Tanegashima and Yakushima

The binomial is a reference to the Japanese name of the species, aogera.

== Conservation Status ==
Informations of the woodpecker's overall population are not available, but it's common and the population is stable. The IUCN has listed the woodpecker's conservation status as Least concern.
