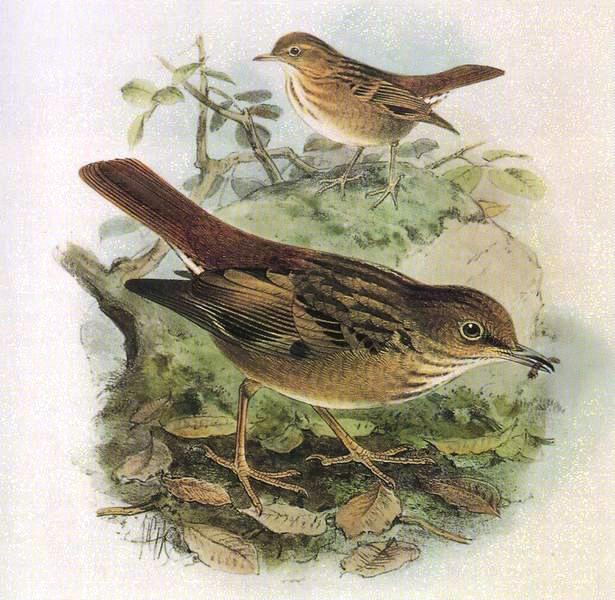

Conservation status
- Extinct (c.1830s) (IUCN 3.1)

Scientific classification
- Kingdom: Animalia
- Phylum: Chordata
- Class: Aves
- Order: Passeriformes
- Family: Turdidae
- Genus: Zoothera
- Species: †Z. terrestris

Binomial name
- †Zoothera terrestris (Kittlitz, 1830)

Synonyms
- Turdus terrestris Kittlitz, 1830; Geocichla terrestris Bonaparte, 1850; Cichlopasser terrestris Bonaparte, 1854

= Bonin thrush =

Extinct species of bird

The Bonin thrush (Zoothera terrestris), also known as Kittlitz's thrush or the Bonin Islands thrush, is an extinct species of Asian thrush. It is sometimes separated as the only species of the genus Cichlopasser. The only place where this bird was found was Chichi-jima in the Ogasawara Islands; it might conceivably have inhabited Anijima and Otōtojima, but this has not been borne out by observations or specimens. The species was only once observed by a naturalist, its discoverer Heinrich von Kittlitz. He encountered the thrush in the coastal woods where it usually kept to the ground; it may have been ground-nesting. The only specimens ever taken are in the Naturalis in Leiden (1), the Naturhistorisches Museum in Vienna (1), the Senckenbergmuseum in Frankfurt (1) and in the Zoological Museum, St. Petersburg (2).

== Extinction ==
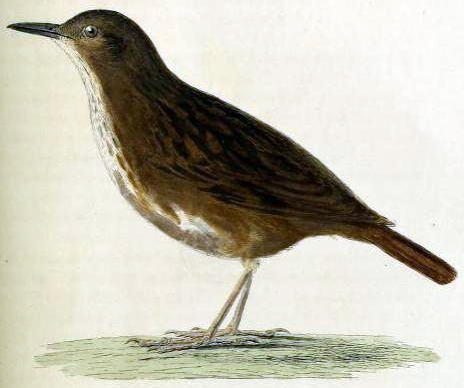
1828 illustration

The Bonin thrush is not among the birds observed or collected by the Beechey Pacific expedition which called at Chichi-jima in 1827. It was only found the following year, when Kittlitz took the five specimens; he considered them common enough around the landing site. It is unknown why Beechey's expedition, which landed at the same location, did not find them.

Following the suggestion of two shipwrecked sailors (who were picked up by Beechey in 1827) that the island would make a good stopover station for whalers, settlement was begun in 1830. When Perry's first mission to Japan called at Chichi-jima in 1853, they did not find the bird again; neither did naturalist William Stimpson of the Rodgers-Ringgold North Pacific Exploring and Surveying Expedition in the following year. Instead, they encountered rats and feral goats, sheep, dogs and cats (feral pigs were already found by Kittlitz and may have been left by Beechey to provision possible future castaways). Just like the Bonin grosbeak, the Bonin thrush probably succumbed soon after 1830 to predation by the introduced mammals and habitat destruction.
