= Ryukyu wood pigeon =

Conservation status
- Extinct (late 1930s) (IUCN 3.1)

Scientific classification
- Kingdom: Animalia
- Phylum: Chordata
- Class: Aves
- Order: Columbiformes
- Family: Columbidae
- Genus: Columba
- Species: †C. jouyi

Binomial name
- †Columba jouyi (Stejneger, 1887)

Synonyms
- Janthoenas jouyi Stejneger, 1887; Carpophaga janthina Seebohm, 1887 (partim)

Extinct species of bird

The Ryukyu wood pigeon (Columba jouyi), otherwise known as the silver-banded or silver-crescented pigeon is an extinct species of dove of the genus Columba. This wood pigeon was endemic to the Laurel forest habitat.

== Distribution ==
It is an extinct species of pigeon that was endemic to islands in the Okinawa archipelago southwest of the Japanese mainland. In the Okinawa group, it has been recorded from Iheyajima, Izenajima, Okinawa proper and the nearby islet Yagachijima. In the Kerama Retto to the west of Okinawa, it was found on Zamamijima, whereas in the Daitō group, some 300 km to the SE of Okinawa, it occurred on both major islets, Kita Daitōjima and Minami Daitōjima. In earlier times, it was most likely found on other islands near Okinawa, such as Iejima. The species' scientific name honors Stejneger's friend, the specimen collector Pierre Louis Jouy.

== Description ==
Leonhard Stejnege, in his 1887 English publication "Description of a New Species of Fruit-Pigeon", describes the species as similar to Columba janthina:

"but with a large whitepatch on the lower hind neck and the anterior portion of the interscapilium; metallic reflections on scapulars and back bronzy-green, not purple as in C. janthina."

Three skins are recorded in the specimen register of three skins in the Natural History Museum at Tring.

== Extinction ==
Like all species of Japanese wood pigeons, the Ryukyu wood pigeon was susceptible to habitat destruction. It required substantial areas of undisturbed subtropical forest to thrive. Iejima, for example, was deforested for settlement and agriculture even before scientific exploration began, which explains the absence of records from this island. The species was last recorded on Okinawa in 1904, probably succumbing to hunting. In the Daitō group, it disappeared after 1936 due to these small islands being completely deforested by settlement and construction activity prior to World War II. It was presumed to continue to exist on the outlying islands in the Okinawa group, but has never been found again.

Theoretically, there is sufficient habitat remaining in the mountains of Okinawa. The military activity during World War II and hunting by the Japanese garrison would probably have yielded sightings, if birds still had existed there. More puzzling is the absence of any records from Tokashikijima in the Kerama Retto, which, despite being small, has still mostly intact forest cover even today; Zamamijima, where the species is known to have occurred is smaller still and situated further away from the Okinawan mainland.
