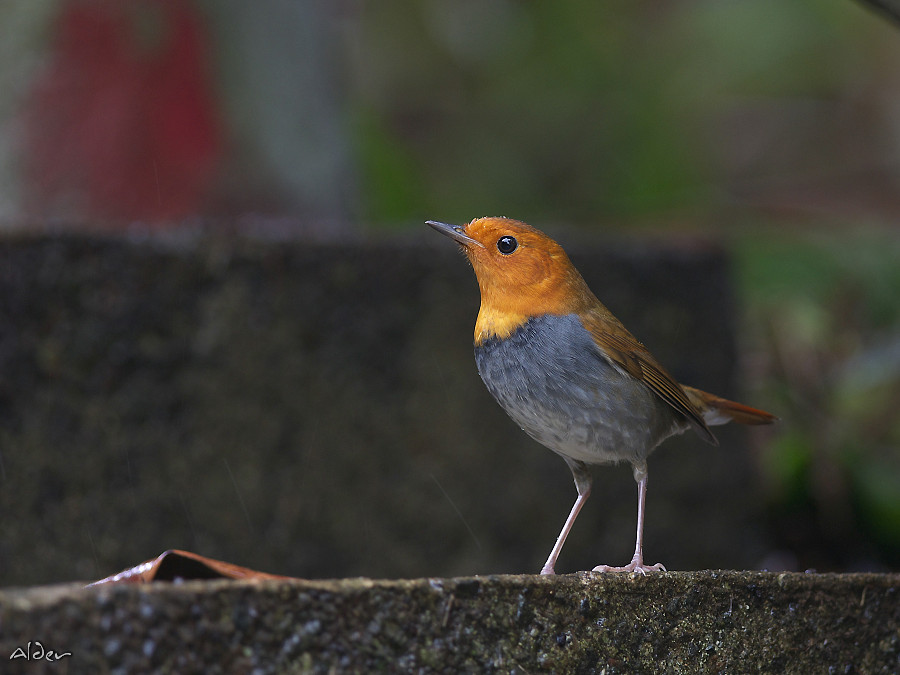

Conservation status
- Least Concern (IUCN 3.1)

Scientific classification
- Kingdom: Animalia
- Phylum: Chordata
- Class: Aves
- Order: Passeriformes
- Family: Muscicapidae
- Genus: Larvivora
- Species: L. akahige

Binomial name
- Larvivora akahige (Temminck, 1835)

Synonyms
- Erithacus akahige Luscinia akahige

= Japanese robin =

Species of bird

The Japanese robin (Larvivora akahige) is a small passerine bird in the family Muscicapidae. This species was formerly named Erithacus akahige, or Komadori. Its range extends from the south of the Kuril and Sakhalin Islands throughout Japan.

The name "Japanese robin" is also sometimes used for the red-billed leiothrix (Leiothrix lutea). The specific name akahige is, somewhat confusingly, the common name of its relative Larvivora komadori in Japanese.

The Japanese robin, together with the Ryukyu robin and the European robin, was previously placed in the genus Erithacus . A 2006 molecular phylogenetic study found that the two east Asian species were more similar to the Siberian blue robin, at the time in Luscinia, than to the European robin. In 2010 a large study confirmed this result and also found that Luscinia was non-monophyletic. The genus Larvivora was therefore resurrected to accommodate a clade containing the Japanese robin, the Ryukyu robin, the Siberian blue robin and several other species that had previously been placed in Luscinia.

== Description ==
The Japanese robin is about 14-15 centimeters in size. This bird species is mainly gray and bright orange. The male Japanese robin is olive brown from the top of the head to rump, with an orange face and neck, and a grey breast and underside. Their tail is reddish-brown, their legs are pinkish brown, and they have a black bill. The female Japanese robin looks very similar to the male, but their orange and brown color characteristics are much duller and less extensive. The juvenile Japanese robin also looks very similar to the adult, but has dark spotting on the breast, pale rufous feathers from crown to mantle, and a rufus buff.

== Habitat ==
The Japanese robin lives in natural habitats such as islands, lakes, mountains, and temperate forests. These habitats are abundant with species of small insects and plants that the Japanese robin eats. More specifically, this species lives in damp, dense, and shady areas such as undergrowth along valleys and streams. Many Japanese robins are located in broadleaf and deciduous forests throughout the Japanese islands of Honshu, Shikoku, Hokkaido and the Sakhalin Islands, and Yakushima, and during the winters in Southeast Asia.

=== Izu Islands ===
The population of Japanese robins on the Izu Islands in southeastern Japan are so geographically remote that they are usually considered a distinguishable subspecies, L. akahige tanensis, from the mainland populations, L. akahige akahige, based on phenotypic characteristics, such as feather colouration. Additionally, while the mainland Japanese robin usually inhabits deciduous and mixed coniferous forests in the summer, the Izu Islands subspecies migrates to lowland, warm-temperature forests instead. Due to the distance between the two populations, gene flow between the two subspecies is rare and inbreeding within the Izu Islands populations is relatively common.

== History ==
The Japanese robin is an abundant species of robin from the islands of Japan. The Japanese robin, along with the Ryukyu robin, can be traced back to 1835 when they were placed into one of the Coenraad Jacob Temminck's works under the name Erithacus akahige. After the 2006 molecular phylogenetic study, the species was placed into a clade under Larvivora, meaning "caterpillar eater," giving it half of its current scientific name.

== Diet ==
The Japanese robin, as hinted by its scientific name meaning "caterpillar eater," is known for feeding on beetles, insects, milled worms, small crickets, fruits, and other small insects. Given their diet, they are considered omnivorous.

== Reproduction ==
The Japanese robin reproduces throughout May and June in central Japan. Their nest typically consists of moss, twigs, dry leaves, ferns, and roots. When the female is ready, she lays about 3-5 eggs of greenish color, one egg per day, and incubates them for roughly 2 weeks. Once born, the young chicks are nurtured for a month, or 31 days, before they leave the nest and become independent. The robin does not mate for life and only finds a partner during the spring mating season.

== Bird song ==
The Japanese robin has a single note that is extremely loud at first, but tones down throughout the song. The robin's call is similar to a telephone ring: well-spaced and simple phrases, along with short chattering. Females tend to sing during nest building and during the incubation period. Males will sing, but their frequency will drastically reduce once eggs have been laid.
