= List of Intangible Cultural Properties of Japan (Hyōgo) =

This list is of the Intangible Cultural Properties of Japan in the Prefecture of Hyōgo.

== National Cultural Properties ==
As of 1 July 2015, four Important Intangible Cultural Properties have been designated, being of national significance.

=== Performing Arts ===
Property	Holder	Comments	Image	Ref.
Classic Rakugo 古典落語 koten rakugo	Nakagawa Kiyoshi (中川清)			
Ningyō Jōruri Bunraku 人形浄瑠璃文楽 ningyō jōruri bunraku	Tsukamoto Kazuo (塚本和男), Hirao Katsuyoshi (平尾勝義)	inscribed on the UNESCO Representative List of the Intangible Cultural Heritage of Humanity		
Gidayū Bushi Shamisen 義太夫節三味線 gidayū bushi shamisen	Miyazaki Kimiko (宮崎 君子)			

=== Craft Techniques ===
Property	Holder	Comments	Image	Ref.
Najio Gampi-shi 名塩雁皮紙; Najio gampi-shi	Tanino Takenobu (谷野武信)			

== Prefectural Cultural Properties ==
As of 1 May 2014, four properties have been designated at a prefectural level.

=== Performing Arts ===
Property	Holder	Comments	Image	Ref.
Sumagoto 須磨琴(一絃琴) sumagoto (ichigenkin)	Koike Miyoko (小池美代子)			

=== Craft Techniques ===
Property	Holder	Comments	Image	Ref.
Arima-fude Technique 有馬筆(書画用)技術; Arima-fude (shoga-yō) gijutsu	Arima-fude Technique Preservation Society (有馬筆(書画用)技術保存会)	doll brushes		
Najio-gami Technique 名塩紙技術; Najio-gami gijutsu	Najio-gami Technique Preservation Society (名塩紙技術保存会)	washi		
Sugihara-gami Technique 杉原紙技術; Sugihara-gami gijutsu	Sugihara-gami Preservation Society (杉原紙保存会)	washi		

== Municipal Cultural Properties ==
As of 1 May 2014, five properties have been designated at a municipal level.

== Intangible Cultural Properties that need measures such as making records ==
As of 1 May 2014, there were two Intangible Cultural Properties that need measures such as making records (記録作成等の措置を講ずべき無形文化財).

=== Craft Techniques ===
Property	Holder	Comments	Image	Ref.
Tanba Cloth 丹波布; Tanba-fu	Tanba Cloth Technique Preservation Society (丹波布技術保存会)	revived in 1954 after production died out at the end of the Meiji period		
Tamba Tachikui Kilns 丹波立杭窯; Tanba tachikui-gama	Tamba Tachikui Kilns Preservation Society (丹波立杭窯保存会)	climbing kilns		
