= W. gracilis =

W. gracilis may refer to:

- Wahlenbergia gracilis, a wildflower species
- Washingtonia gracilis, a palm species in the genus Washingtonia
- Wikstroemia gracilis, a shrub species in the genus Wikstroemia

== See also ==
- Gracilis (disambiguation)
