= Blue (O'Keeffe series) =

1916 series of paintings by Georgia O'Keeffe

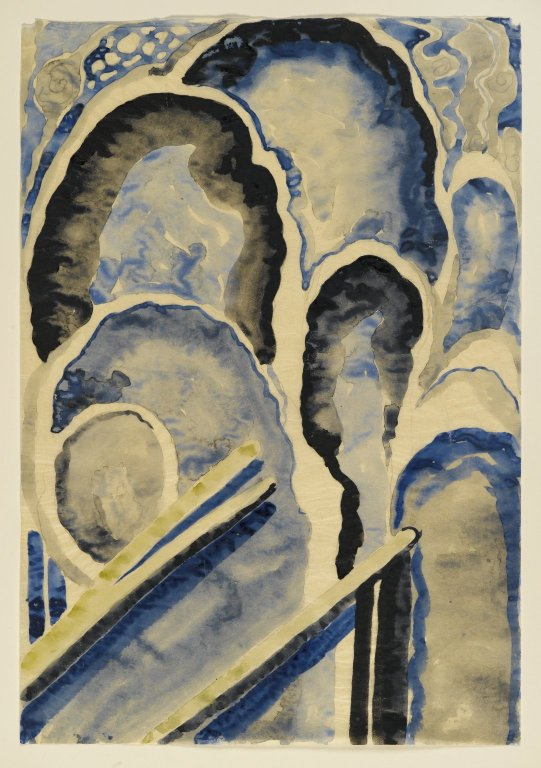
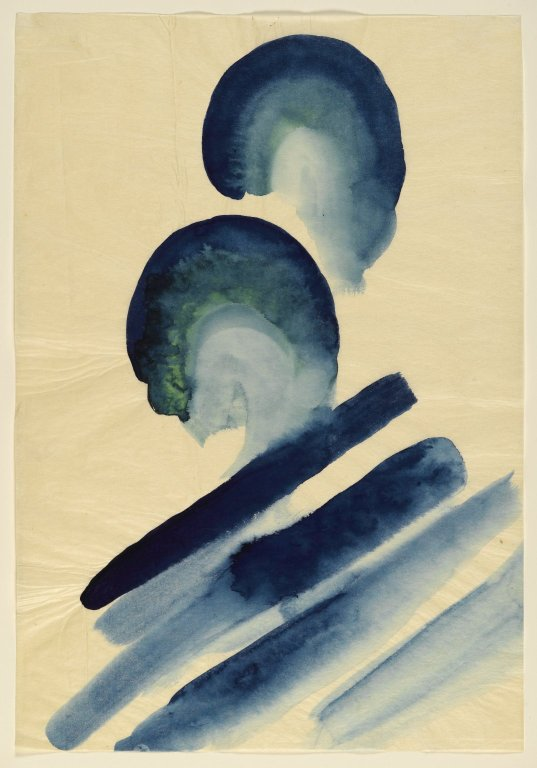
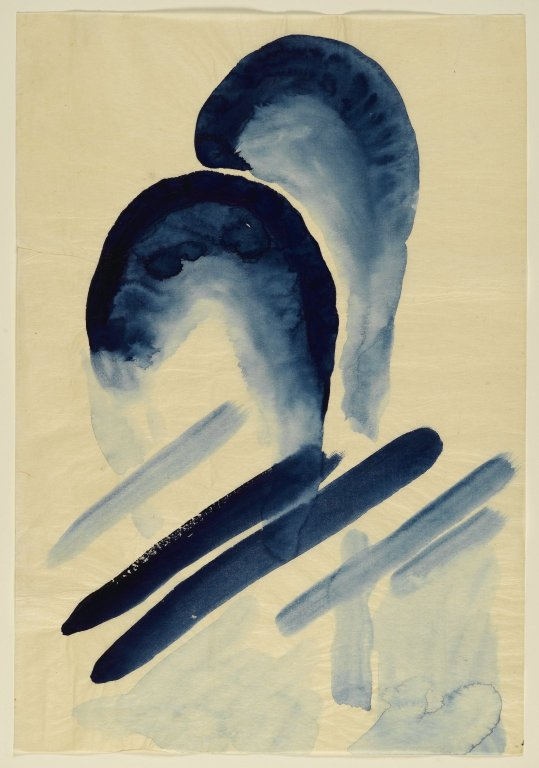
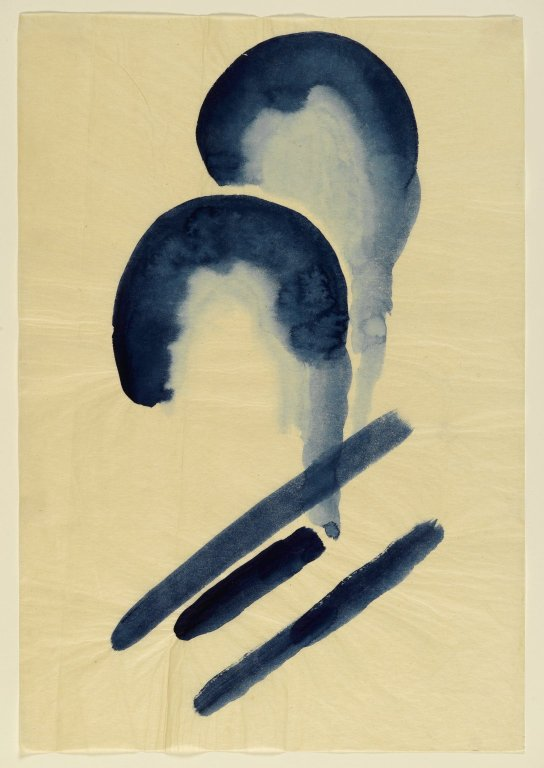
- Top row: Blue #1, Blue #2
- Second row: Blue #3, Blue #4

Blue is the name of four paintings that Georgia O'Keeffe made in 1916. It was one of the sets of watercolors that she made exploring a monochromatic palette with designs that were non-representational of specific objects. The paintings were made on 15 7/8-by-11-inch (40.3 cm × 27.9 cm) sheets of Japanese tissue of the gampi tree.

Blue No. 2 was made in Virginia before O'Keeffe moved to Texas. One opinion is that through Blue No. II, O'Keeffe expresses her personal experience with music. For instance, the shape is like the curves of the neck of the violin, which she was playing during the timeframe. She could also be suggesting emotion felt through music through the use of line and the intense blue color, perhaps influenced by Wassily Kandinsky. Another viewpoint is that it is similar to the lines in charcoal drawing No. 8 Special made in 1916.

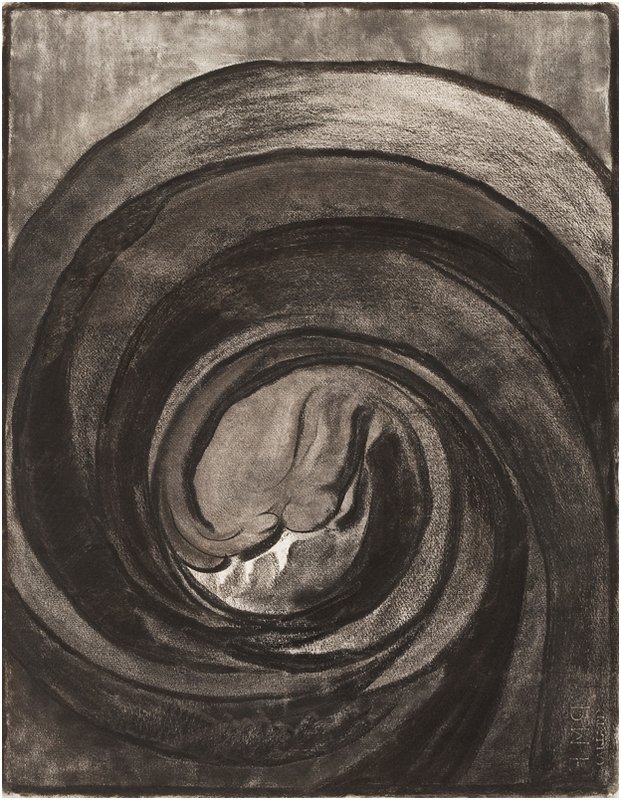
Georgia O'Keeffe, No. 8 Special, charcoal drawing, 1916
