= Gampi =

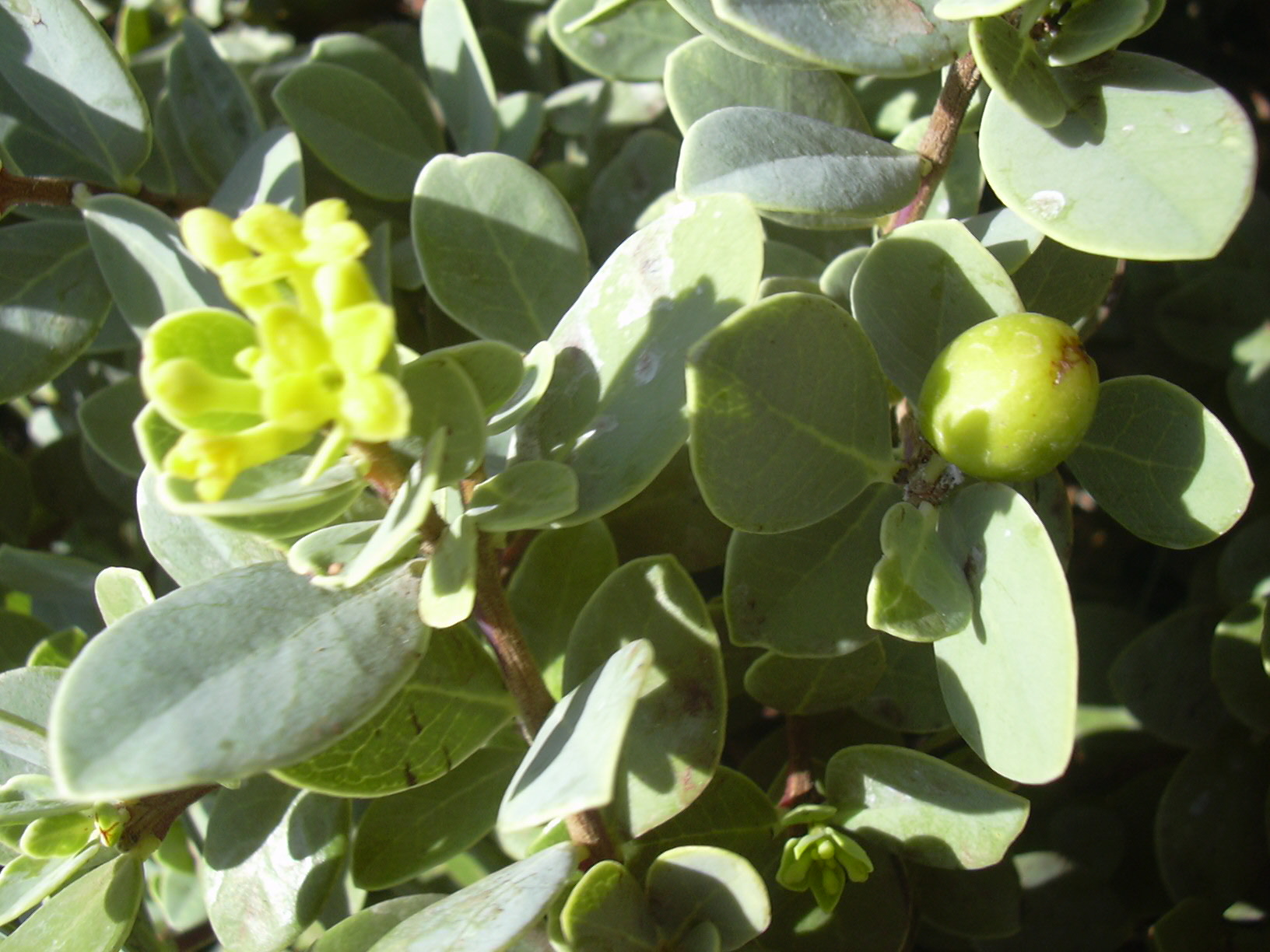
Wikstroemia uva-ursi with unripe fruit

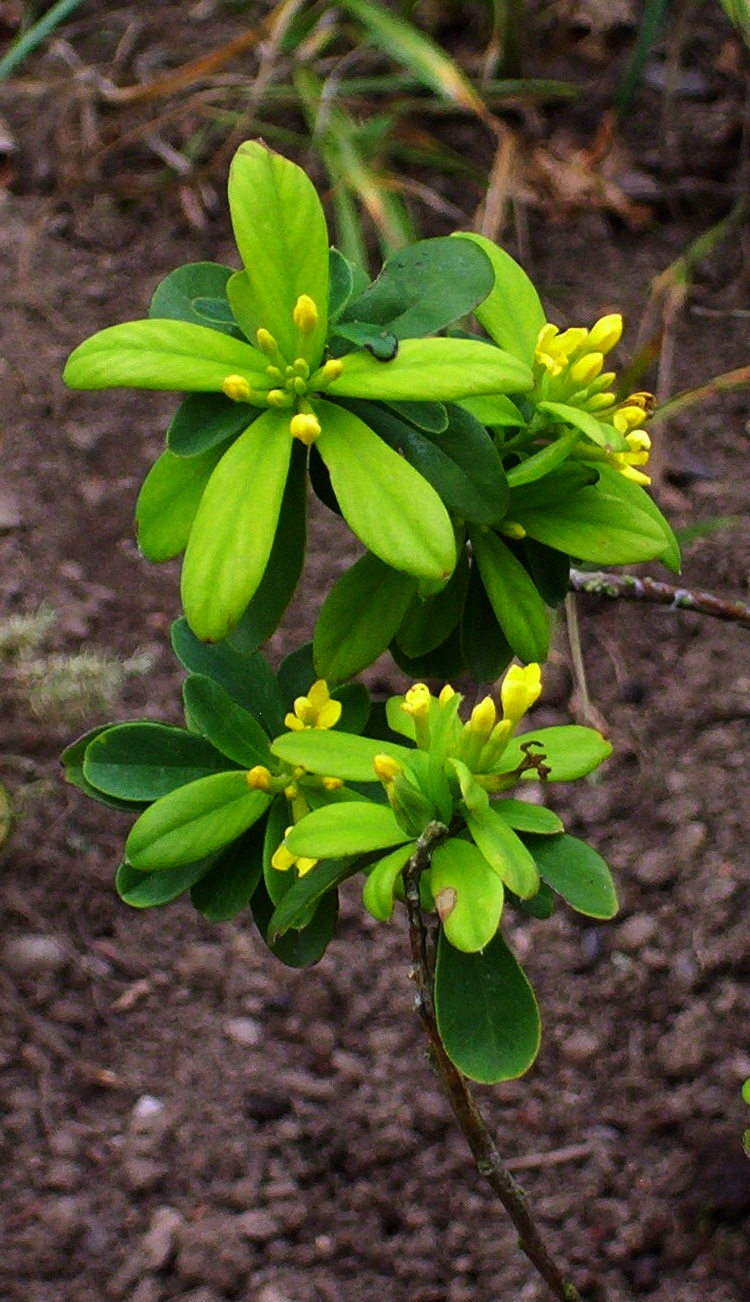
Wikstroemia gemmata

Gampi or ganpi are a group of Japanese shrubs, members of the genus Wikstroemia, some of which have been used for making paper since the 8th century. It is used to make the high quality washi paper, as are the kōzo and mitsumata trees.

Various sources have identified gampi or ganpi as:

- Wikstroemia albiflora Yatabe: known as Miyama ganpi in Japan
- Wikstroemia canescens (Wall.) Meisn. (syn. Diplomorpha canescens): a south Asian plant
- Wikstroemia ganpi (Siebold & Zucc.) Maxim.: known as Ko ganpi in Japan
- Wikstroemia kudoi Makino: Endemic to Kyushu (Yakushima). Known as Shakunan-ganpi in Japan.
- Wikstroemia pauciflora (Franch. & Sav.) Makino: known as Sakura ganpi in Japan
- Wikstroemia pseudoretusa Koidz.: Endemic to the Ogasawara Islands. Known in Japan as Munin-aoganpi.
- Wikstroemia retusa A.Gray: known in Japan as Ao ganpi
- Wikstroemia sikokiana Franch. & Sav. (syn. Diplomorpha sikokiana): known in Japan as Ganpi
- Wikstroemia trichotoma (Thunb.) Makino: used for paper-making in China, Korea and Japan; known as Ki ganpi in Japan.
