= Wikstroemia taiwanensis =

Scientific classification
- Kingdom: Plantae
- Clade: Tracheophytes
- Clade: Angiosperms
- Clade: Eudicots
- Clade: Rosids
- Order: Malvales
- Family: Thymelaeaceae
- Genus: Wikstroemia
- Species: W. taiwanensis

Binomial name
- Wikstroemia taiwanensis C.E. Chang

Species of shrub

Wikstroemia taiwanensis is a shrub in the family Thymelaeaceae.

== Uses ==
It is known to produce a biflavonoid that shows activity against Mycobacterium tuberculosis.
