= Wikstroemia tenuiramis =

Scientific classification
- Kingdom: Plantae
- Clade: Tracheophytes
- Clade: Angiosperms
- Clade: Eudicots
- Clade: Rosids
- Order: Malvales
- Family: Thymelaeaceae
- Genus: Wikstroemia
- Species: W. tenuiramis

Binomial name
- Wikstroemia tenuiramis Miq.

Synonyms
- Wikstroemia acuminata Merr.; Wikstroemia clementis Merr.

Species of tree

Wikstroemia tenuiramis grows as a small tree up to 10 metres (30 ft) tall. Inflorescences bear up to five yellowish or cream-coloured flowers. Fruit is yellow, green or orange. The specific epithet tenuiramis is from the Latin meaning 'thin branches'. Habitat is swamps and forests from sea-level to 1,600 metres (5,200 ft) altitude. W. tenuiramis is found in Sumatra and Borneo.
