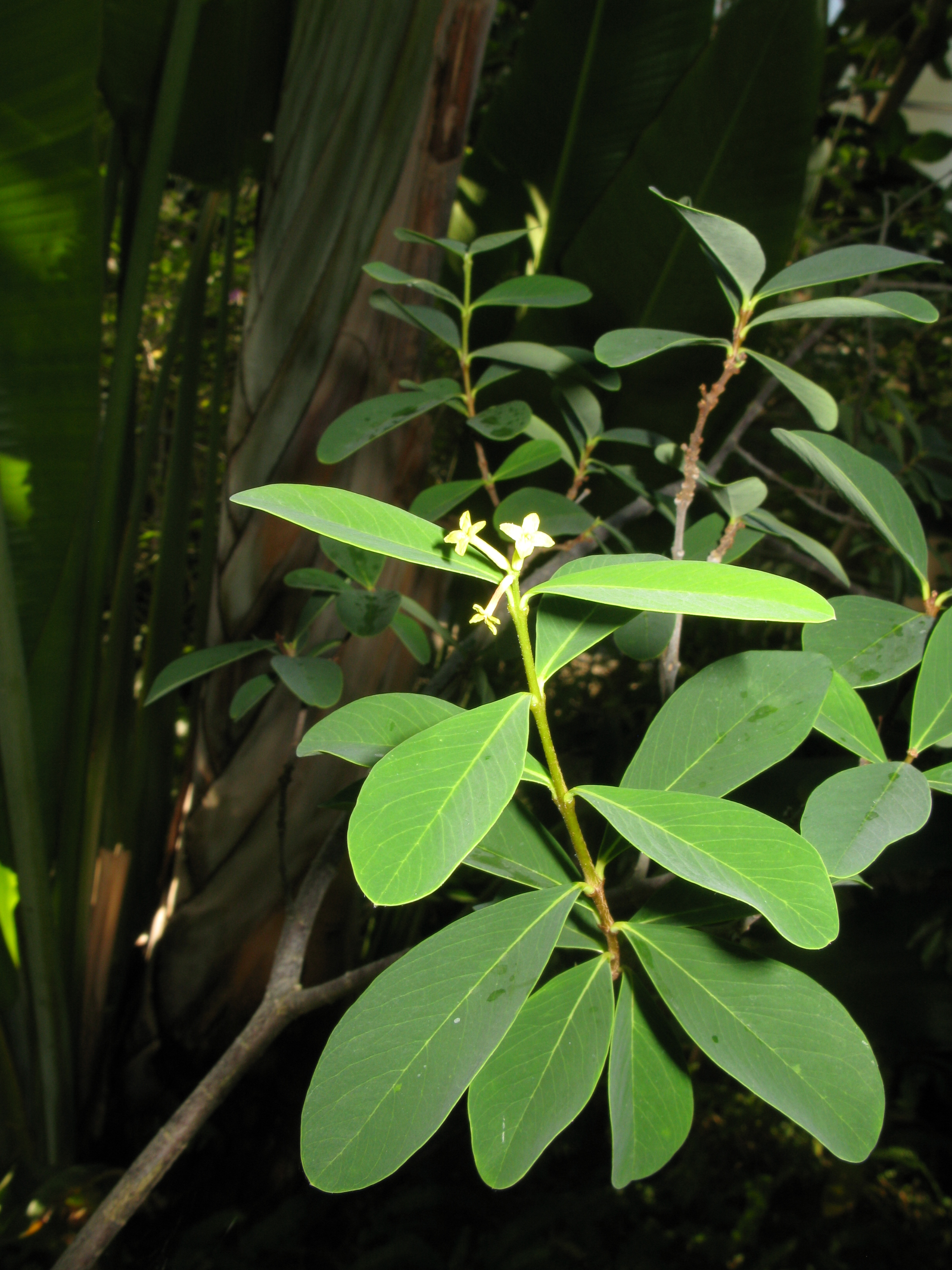

Scientific classification
- Kingdom: Plantae
- Clade: Tracheophytes
- Clade: Angiosperms
- Clade: Eudicots
- Clade: Rosids
- Order: Malvales
- Family: Thymelaeaceae
- Genus: Wikstroemia
- Species: W. pseudoretusa

Binomial name
- Wikstroemia pseudoretusa Koidz.

= Wikstroemia pseudoretusa =

Species of plant

Wikstroemia pseudoretusa is a species of flowering plant in the family Thymelaeaceae that is endemic to the Bonin Islands, Tōkyō Metropolis, Japan.

== Taxonomy ==
The species was first described by Japanese botanist Gen-ichi Koidzumi in 1919. Koidzumi noted its closeness to Wikstroemia retusa.

== Ecology ==
Wikstroemia pseudoretusa seeds an important part of the diet of the Ogaswara greenfinch.

== Conservation status ==
Wikstroemia pseudoretusa is classed as Near Threatened on the Ministry of the Environment Red List.

== See also ==
- Ogasawara subtropical moist forests
- Ogasawara National Park
