= Wikstroemia angustifolia =

Scientific classification
- Kingdom: Plantae
- Clade: Tracheophytes
- Clade: Angiosperms
- Clade: Eudicots
- Clade: Rosids
- Order: Malvales
- Family: Thymelaeaceae
- Genus: Wikstroemia
- Species: W. angustifolia

Binomial name
- Wikstroemia angustifolia Hemsl.

Synonyms
- Daphne hemsleyi Halda

Species of shrub

Wikstroemia angustifolia is a shrub in the family Thymelaeaceae. It is native to China, specifically western Hubei, eastern Sichuan, and southern Shanxi.

== Description ==
The shrub is erect and broomlike and grows from 0.3 to 1.0 m tall. Its branches are slender. It is often found in forest margins, open bushlands, and in on rocks at altitudes of 100–200 m.
