= Wikstroemia elliptica =

Scientific classification
- Kingdom: Plantae
- Clade: Tracheophytes
- Clade: Angiosperms
- Clade: Eudicots
- Clade: Rosids
- Order: Malvales
- Family: Thymelaeaceae
- Genus: Wikstroemia
- Species: W. elliptica

Binomial name
- Wikstroemia elliptica Merr.

Species of shrub

Wikstroemia elliptica is a shrub, of the family Thymelaeaceae. It is native to Guam and Micronesia.

== Description ==
The shrub has smooth reddish bark and small light green leaves. Its flowers bloom yellowish green and bear bright red fruit. It is often found on volcanic and limestone soils and savannah terrain.
