= Wikstroemia paxiana =

Scientific classification
- Kingdom: Plantae
- Clade: Tracheophytes
- Clade: Angiosperms
- Clade: Eudicots
- Clade: Rosids
- Order: Malvales
- Family: Thymelaeaceae
- Genus: Wikstroemia
- Species: W. paxiana

Binomial name
- Wikstroemia paxiana H. Winkler

Species of shrub

Wikstroemia paxiana is a shrub in the family Thymelaeaceae. It is native to China, specifically Sichuan.

== Description ==
The shrub grows up to 0.3 to 0.5 m tall. Its branches are slender and glabrescent. Its drupes are reddish, and around 6 mm wide.
