= Wikstroemia liangii =

Scientific classification
- Kingdom: Plantae
- Clade: Tracheophytes
- Clade: Angiosperms
- Clade: Eudicots
- Clade: Rosids
- Order: Malvales
- Family: Thymelaeaceae
- Genus: Wikstroemia
- Species: W. liangii

Binomial name
- Wikstroemia liangii Merr. & Chun

Species of shrub

Wikstroemia liangii is a shrub, of the family Thymelaeaceae. It is native to China, specifically Hainan.

== Description ==
The shrub grows up to 2.0 m tall. Its branches are reddish-brown and glabrous and it flowers between June and September. It is often found in forest and stream banks.
