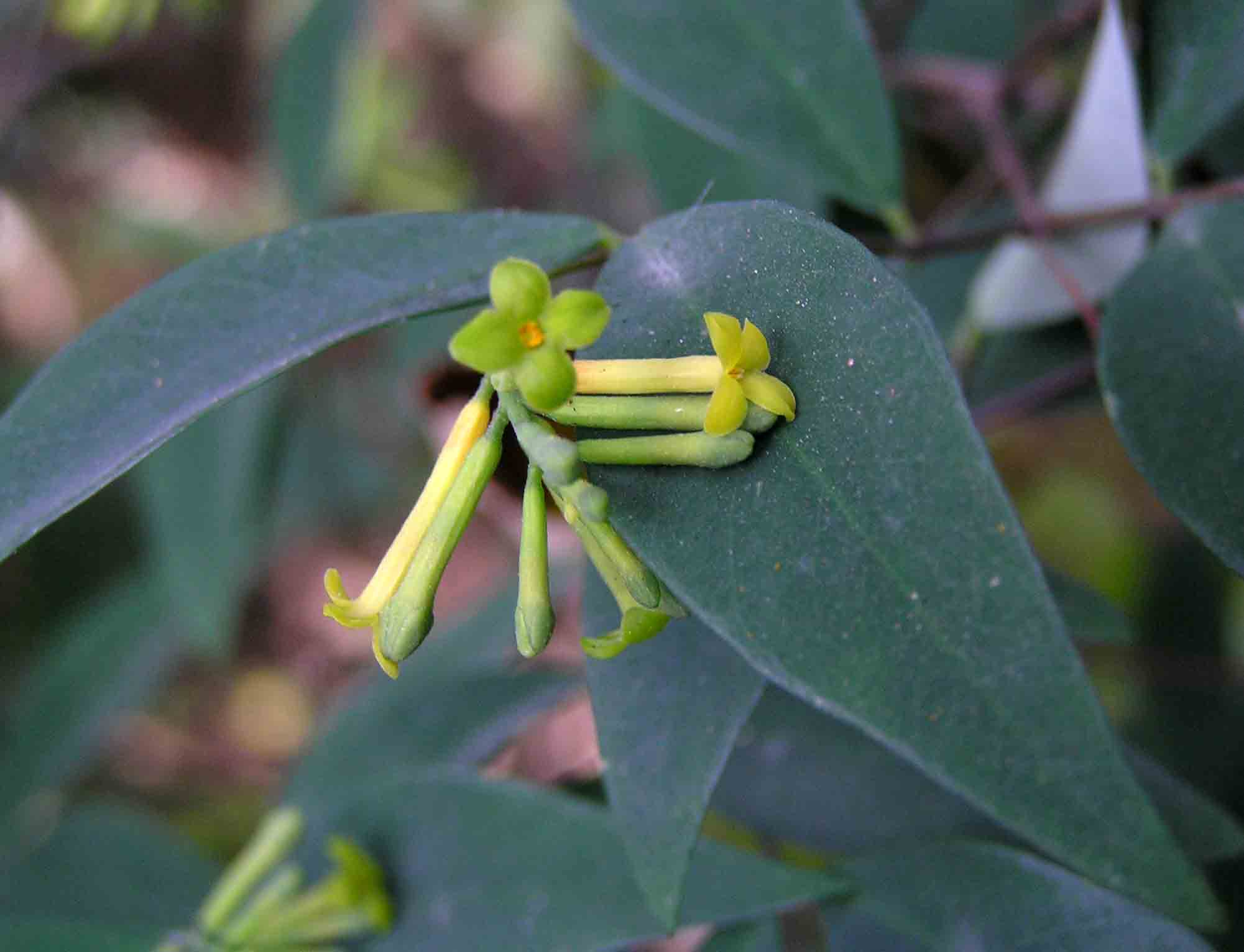

Scientific classification
- Kingdom: Plantae
- Clade: Tracheophytes
- Clade: Angiosperms
- Clade: Eudicots
- Clade: Rosids
- Order: Malvales
- Family: Thymelaeaceae
- Genus: Wikstroemia
- Species: W. nutans

Binomial name
- Wikstroemia nutans Champ.

= Wikstroemia nutans =

Species of shrub

Wikstroemia nutans is a shrub in the family Thymelaeaceae. It is native to Taiwan and China, specifically Fujian, Guangxi, Hainan, Hunan, Jiangxi, and Guangdong.

== Description ==
The shrub grows from 1 to 2 m tall. Its branches are a reddish or grayish-brown color, and its drupes are dark red. It flowers from spring through early summer, and bears fruit from summer through autumn. It is often found in forests, shrubby slopes, valleys, and roadsides at altitudes of 300 to 1500 m.
