= Wikstroemia linoides =

Scientific classification
- Kingdom: Plantae
- Clade: Tracheophytes
- Clade: Angiosperms
- Clade: Eudicots
- Clade: Rosids
- Order: Malvales
- Family: Thymelaeaceae
- Genus: Wikstroemia
- Species: W. linoides

Binomial name
- Wikstroemia linoides Hemsl.

Synonyms
- Daphne linoides (Hemsl.) Halda

Species of shrub

Wikstroemia linoides is a shrub in the family Thymelaeaceae. It is native to China, specifically Hubei, Shaanxi, and Sichuan.

== Description ==
The shrub grows from 0.3 to 0.9 m (12 to 35 in) tall. Its branches are slender. Its flowers and berries are yellow. It can be found on hillsides at altitudes of 680 to 1,600 m (2,230 to 5,250 ft).
