= Wikstroemia ligustrina =

Scientific classification
- Kingdom: Plantae
- Clade: Tracheophytes
- Clade: Angiosperms
- Clade: Eudicots
- Clade: Rosids
- Order: Malvales
- Family: Thymelaeaceae
- Genus: Wikstroemia
- Species: W. ligustrina

Binomial name
- Wikstroemia ligustrina Rehder

Species of shrub

Wikstroemia ligustrina is a shrub, of the family Thymelaeaceae. It is native to China, specifically Hebei, Shaanxi, Shanxi, Sichuan, and Yunnan.

== Description ==
The shrub grows up to 0.5 to 1.5 m tall. Its branches are erect, broom-like and it flowers in autumn. It is often found in forest margins and shrubby slopes at altitudes of 1900 to 2700 m.
