= Wikstroemia stenophylla =

Scientific classification
- Kingdom: Plantae
- Clade: Tracheophytes
- Clade: Angiosperms
- Clade: Eudicots
- Clade: Rosids
- Order: Malvales
- Family: Thymelaeaceae
- Genus: Wikstroemia
- Species: W. stenophylla

Binomial name
- Wikstroemia stenophylla Pritz.

Species of shrub

Wikstroemia stenophylla is a shrub in the family Thymelaeaceae. It is evergreen, and is found in China, specifically Sichuan.

== Description ==
The shrub generally grows to a height of 0.2 to 0.8 meters, but can reach a height of up to 1.3 meters. It flowers during summer and autumn, and grows at altitudes from 1600 to 2500 meters.
