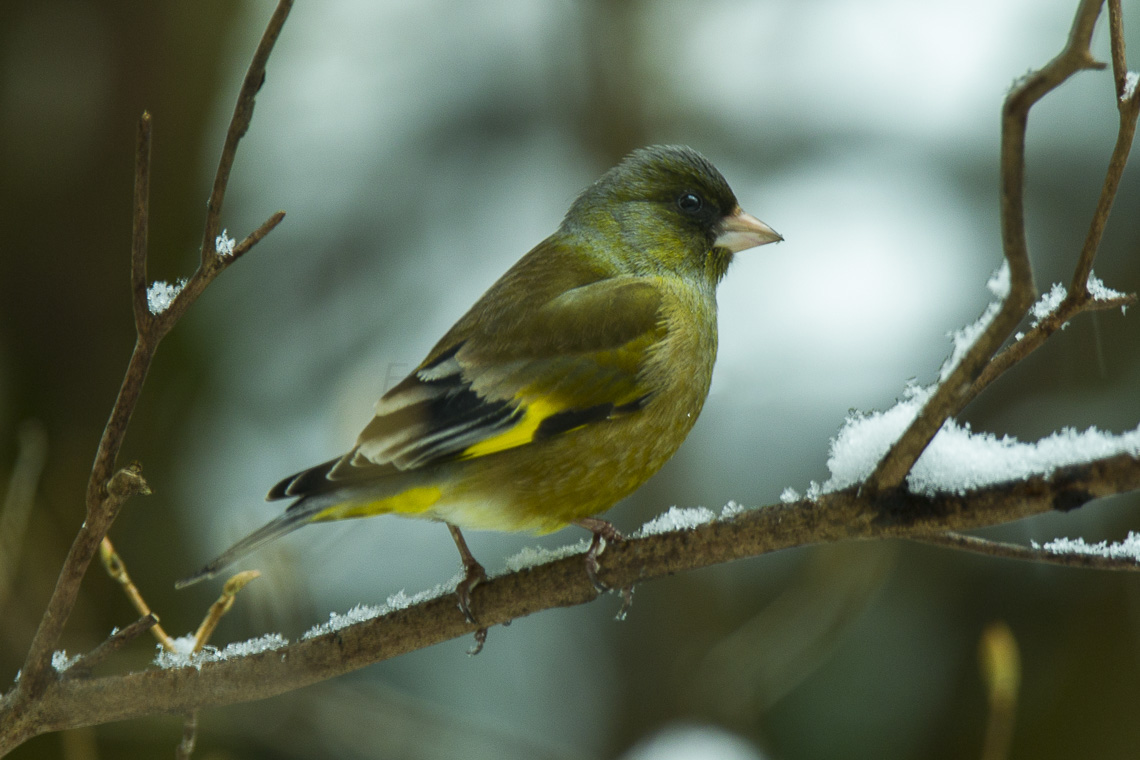

Conservation status
- Least Concern (IUCN 3.1)

Scientific classification
- Kingdom: Animalia
- Phylum: Chordata
- Class: Aves
- Order: Passeriformes
- Family: Fringillidae
- Subfamily: Carduelinae
- Genus: Chloris
- Species: C. sinica

Binomial name
- Chloris sinica (Linnaeus, 1766)

Synonyms
- Fringilla sinica Linnaeus, 1766; Carduelis sinica (Linnaeus, 1766)

= Oriental greenfinch =

Species of bird

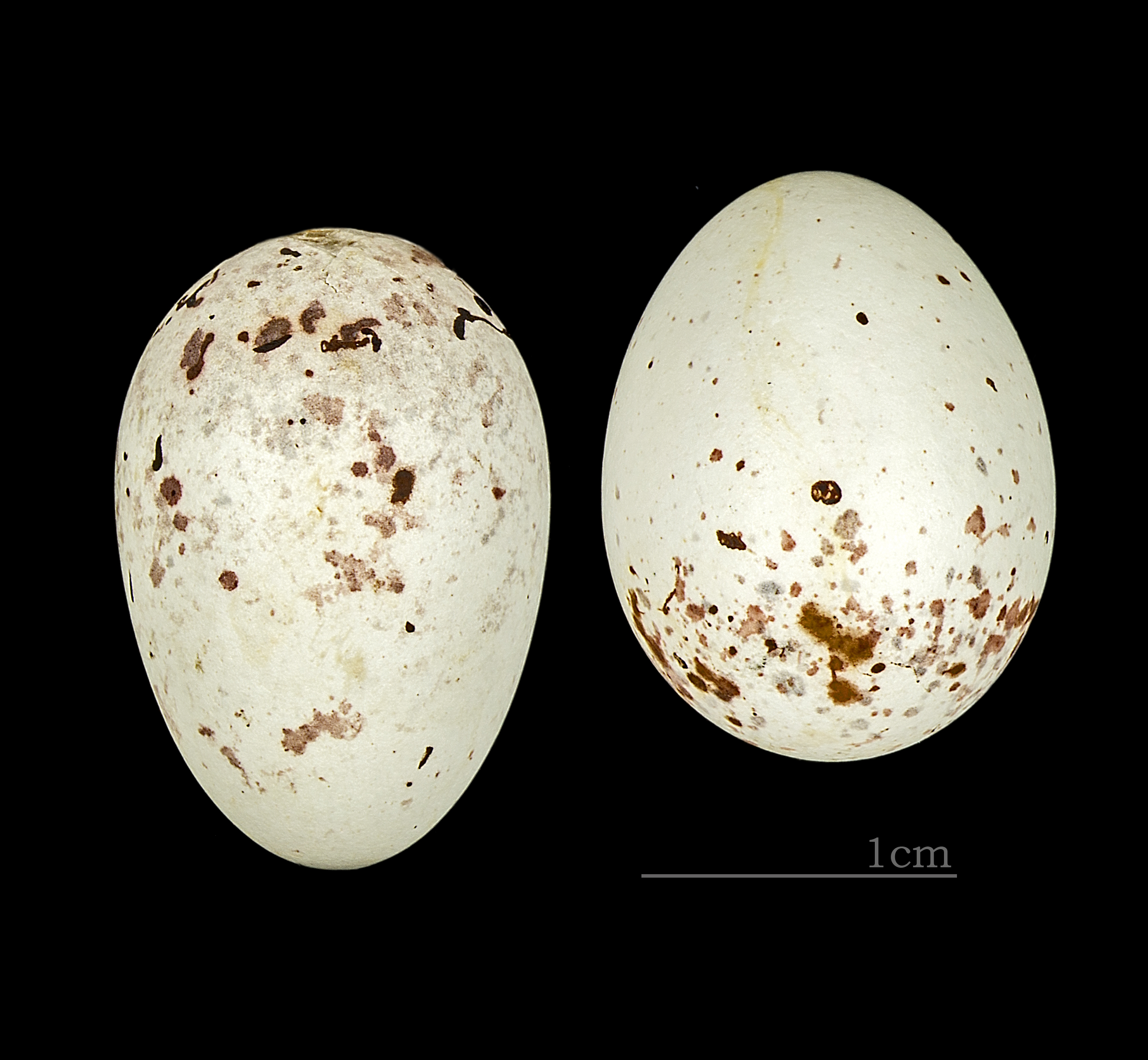
Eggs of Oriental greenfinch MHNT

The Oriental greenfinch (Chloris sinica), also known as the grey-capped greenfinch, is a small passerine bird in the finch family Fringillidae that breeds in broadleaf and conifer woodlands of the East Palearctic.

== Taxonomy ==
In 1760 the French zoologist Mathurin Jacques Brisson included a description of the Oriental greenfinch in his Ornithologie based on a specimen collected in China. He used the French name Le pinçon de la Chine and the Latin Fringilla sinencis. Although Brisson coined Latin names, these do not conform to the binomial system and are not recognised by the International Commission on Zoological Nomenclature. When in 1766 the Swedish naturalist Carl Linnaeus updated his Systema Naturae for the twelfth edition, he added 240 species that had been previously described by Brisson. One of these was the oriental greenfinch. Linnaeus included a brief description, coined the binomial name Fringilla sinica and cited Brisson's work. The type locality was subsequently restricted to Macau in eastern China. The specific name sinica is Medieval Latin for Chinese.

The greenfinches were later placed in the genus Carduelis but when molecular phylogenetic studies found that they were not closely related to the other species in Carduelis, the greenfinches were moved to the resurrected genus Chloris. The genus had been introduced by the French naturalist Georges Cuvier in 1800. The word Chloris is from the Ancient Greek khlōris for a European greenfinch; the specific epithet sinica is Mediaeval Latin for "Chinese".

Five subspecies are now recognised:

- C. s. ussuriensis Hartert, 1903 – Eastern Manchuria to South Ussuriland and Korea
- C. s. kawarahiba (Temminck, 1836) – Kamchatka Peninsula, Kuril Islands, Sakhalin and Hokkaido, Korea(Ulleung Island), winters to Japan
- C. s. minor (Temminck & Schlegel, 1848) – South Japan (Honshu, Shikoku and Kyushu) and Korea (Cheju-Do Island)
- C. s. sinica (Linnaeus, 1766) – Western China (Gansu) to South Manchuria
- C. s. chabarowi (Stegmann, BK 1929) – Inner Mongolia to North Manchuria

The Bonin greenfinch from the Bonin Islands including Iwo Jima, formerly C. s. kittlitzi, is nowadays usually considered a distinct species.

== Description ==
The Oriental greenfinch is a medium-sized finch 12.5 to 14 cm (4.9 to 5.5 in) in length, with a strong bill and a short slightly forked tail. It nests in trees or bushes, laying 3–5 eggs.
