= Wikstroemia alternifolia =

Scientific classification
- Kingdom: Plantae
- Clade: Tracheophytes
- Clade: Angiosperms
- Clade: Eudicots
- Clade: Rosids
- Order: Malvales
- Family: Thymelaeaceae
- Genus: Wikstroemia
- Species: W. alternifolia

Binomial name
- Wikstroemia alternifolia Batalin

Species of shrub

Wikstroemia alternifolia is a shrub, of the family Thymelaeaceae. It is native to China, specifically Gansu and northern Sichuan.

== Description ==
The shrub has white pale branches. It is found on open bushy slopes and rocks at altitudes under 2500 m.
