= Wikstroemia skottsbergiana =

Conservation status
- Critically endangered, possibly extinct (IUCN 3.1)

Scientific classification
- Kingdom: Plantae
- Clade: Tracheophytes
- Clade: Angiosperms
- Clade: Eudicots
- Clade: Rosids
- Order: Malvales
- Family: Thymelaeaceae
- Genus: Wikstroemia
- Species: W. skottsbergiana

Binomial name
- Wikstroemia skottsbergiana Sparre

Species of flowering plant

Wikstroemia skottsbergiana, also called Skottsberg's false ohelo and Skottsberg's wikstroemia, is a species of flowering plant in the family Thymelaeaceae. It is endemic to the island of Kauaʻi in Hawaiʻi, but its range has been severely reduced due to habitat loss. Only one small population of 30 individuals is known, but access to this location has not been permitted to conservationists since 2000, and the habitat surrounding this area has become heavily degraded over the years, raising fears that it may be extinct.
