= Wikstroemia coriacea =

Conservation status
- Least Concern (IUCN 2.3)

Scientific classification
- Kingdom: Plantae
- Clade: Embryophytes
- Clade: Tracheophytes
- Clade: Angiosperms
- Clade: Eudicots
- Clade: Rosids
- Order: Malvales
- Family: Thymelaeaceae
- Genus: Wikstroemia
- Species: W. coriacea

Binomial name
- Wikstroemia coriacea Seem. (1867)

Synonyms
- Daphne christophersenii Halda (2001); Daphne confusa Halda (2000); Daphne coriacea Sol. ex Seem. (1867); Daphne indica subsp. sericea (Christoph.) Halda (2000); Wikstroemia caudata J.W.Moore (1940); Wikstroemia foetida var. tahitensis A.Gray (1865); Wikstroemia sericea Christoph. (1931)

Species of flowering plant

Wikstroemia coriacea is a species of plant in the Thymelaeaceae family. It is native to French Polynesia (Marquesas, Society, and Tubuai islands) and the Cook Islands, Tonga, and Niue.
