= Wikstroemia polyantha =

Scientific classification
- Kingdom: Plantae
- Clade: Tracheophytes
- Clade: Angiosperms
- Clade: Eudicots
- Clade: Rosids
- Order: Malvales
- Family: Thymelaeaceae
- Genus: Wikstroemia
- Species: W. polyantha

Binomial name
- Wikstroemia polyantha Merr.

Synonyms
- Wikstroemia calva Backer; Wikstroemia junghuhnii Valeton

Species of tree

Wikstroemia polyantha grows as a small tree up to 7 metres (20 ft) tall, with a stem diameter of up to 8 centimetres (3 in). The twigs are reddish to dark brown. Inflorescences bear at least six flowers which are yellow, yellowish green or white. Fruits are red. The specific epithet polyantha is from the Greek meaning 'many flowers'. Habitat is forests from sea-level to 2,200 metres (7,000 ft) altitude. W. polyantha is found in Malaysia, Indonesia and the Philippines.
