= Wikstroemia micrantha =

Scientific classification
- Kingdom: Plantae
- Clade: Tracheophytes
- Clade: Angiosperms
- Clade: Eudicots
- Clade: Rosids
- Order: Malvales
- Family: Thymelaeaceae
- Genus: Wikstroemia
- Species: W. micrantha

Binomial name
- Wikstroemia micrantha Hemsl.

Synonyms
- Daphne micrantha (Hemsl.) Halda; Daphne brevipaniculata (Rehder) Halda; Daphne micrantha subsp. paniculata (H.L.Li) Halda; Wikstroemia brevipaniculata Rehder; Wikstroemia ericifolia Domke; Wikstroemia micrantha var. paniculata (H.L.Li) S.C.Huang; Wikstroemia paniculata H.L.Li

Species of shrub

Wikstroemia micrantha is a shrub in the family Thymelaeaceae. It is native to China, specifically Gansu, Guangdong, Guanxi, Guizhou, Hubei, Hunan, Shanxi, Sichuan, and Yunnan.

== Description ==
The shrub grows up to 0.5 to 1.0 m tall. Its branches are green, slender, and glabrous. It flowers and bears fruit in autumn and winter. It is often found in valleys and shrubby slopes at altitudes of 200 to 1000 m.
