= Wikstroemia ovata =

Scientific classification
- Kingdom: Plantae
- Clade: Tracheophytes
- Clade: Angiosperms
- Clade: Eudicots
- Clade: Rosids
- Order: Malvales
- Family: Thymelaeaceae
- Genus: Wikstroemia
- Species: W. ovata

Binomial name
- Wikstroemia ovata C.A.Mey. ex Meisn.

Species of shrub

Wikstroemia ovata grows as a shrub or small tree up to 5 metres (20 ft) tall. Inflorescences bear up to 20 greenish-yellow flowers. The fruits are roundish to ellipsoid, up to 1 cm (0.4 in) long. The specific epithet ovata is from the Latin meaning 'egg-shaped', referring to the leaves. Habitat is thickets and forests from sea level to 800 metres (2,600 ft) altitude. W. ovata is found in Borneo and the Philippines.
