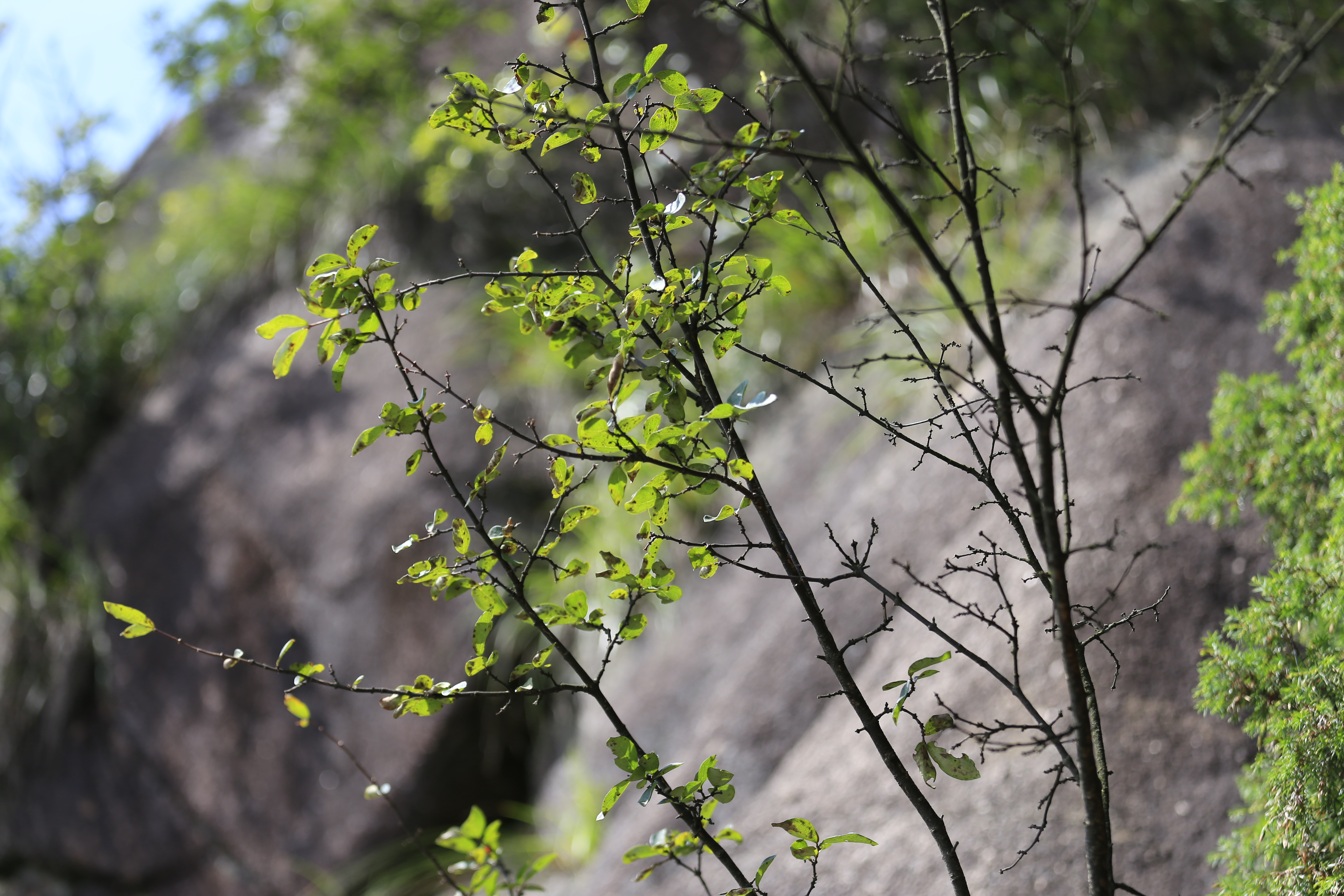

Scientific classification
- Kingdom: Plantae
- Clade: Tracheophytes
- Clade: Angiosperms
- Clade: Eudicots
- Clade: Rosids
- Order: Malvales
- Family: Thymelaeaceae
- Genus: Wikstroemia
- Species: W. monnula

Binomial name
- Wikstroemia monnula Hance

= Wikstroemia monnula =

Species of shrub

Wikstroemia monnula is a shrub in the family Thymelaeaceae. It is native to southern Anhui, Jiangxi, Guangdong, Guangxi, Guizhou, Hunan, and Zhejiang.

== Description ==
The shrub grows from 0.5 to 0.8 m tall. Its branches are yellowish green and angular. It is often found on shrubby slopes and roadsides at altitudes of 600 to 1100 m.
