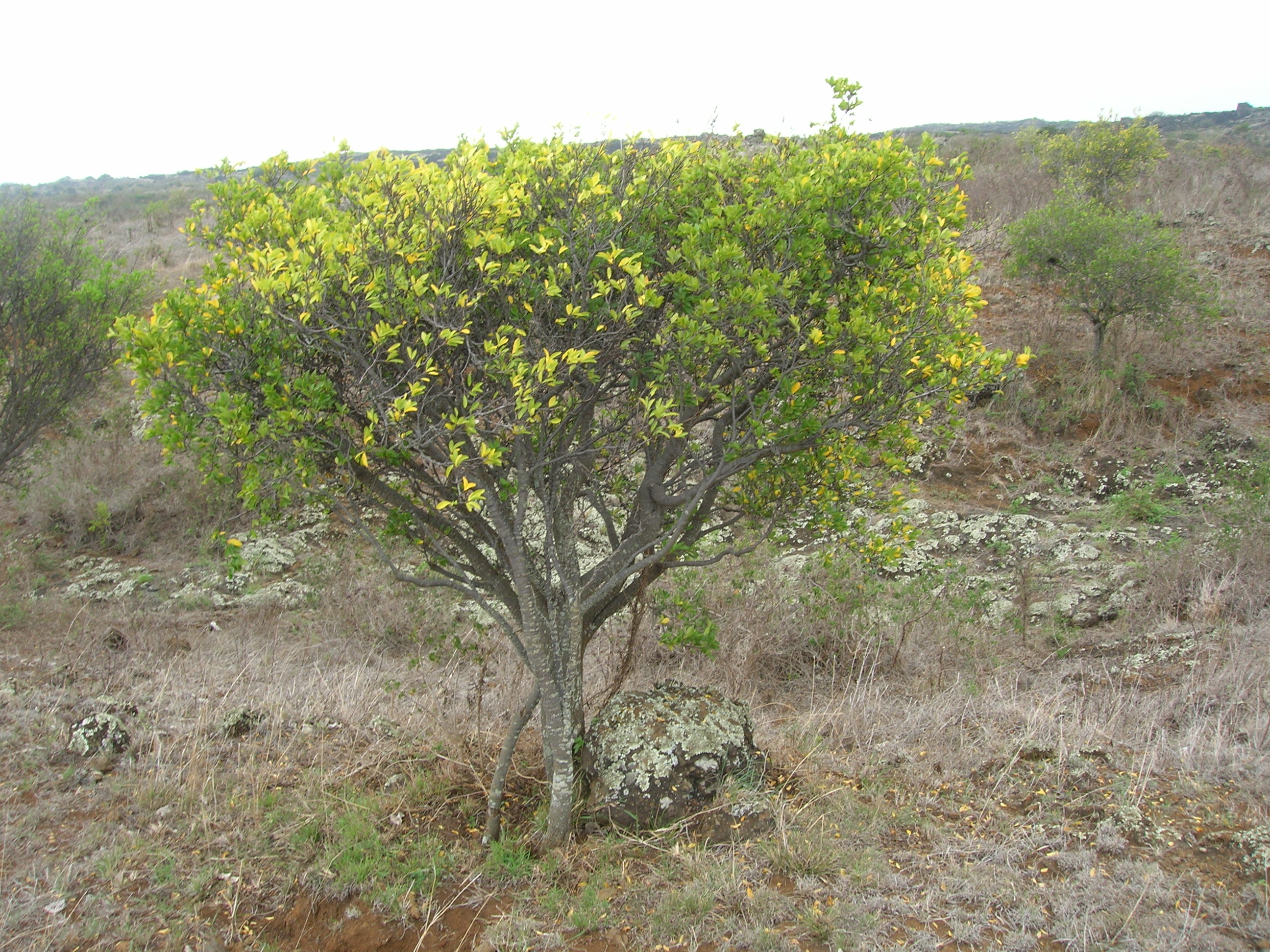

Scientific classification
- Kingdom: Plantae
- Clade: Tracheophytes
- Clade: Angiosperms
- Clade: Eudicots
- Clade: Rosids
- Order: Malvales
- Family: Thymelaeaceae
- Genus: Wikstroemia
- Species: W. monticola

Binomial name
- Wikstroemia monticola Skottsb.

= Wikstroemia monticola =

Species of tree

Wikstroemia monticola, the montane false ohelo, is a small tree, of the family Thymelaeaceae. It is endemic to Hawaii, specifically Maui.

== Description ==
The shrub grows up to 3.0 m tall. Its branches are membranous. Its flowers are greenish yellow and its leaves are dark green and gray.
