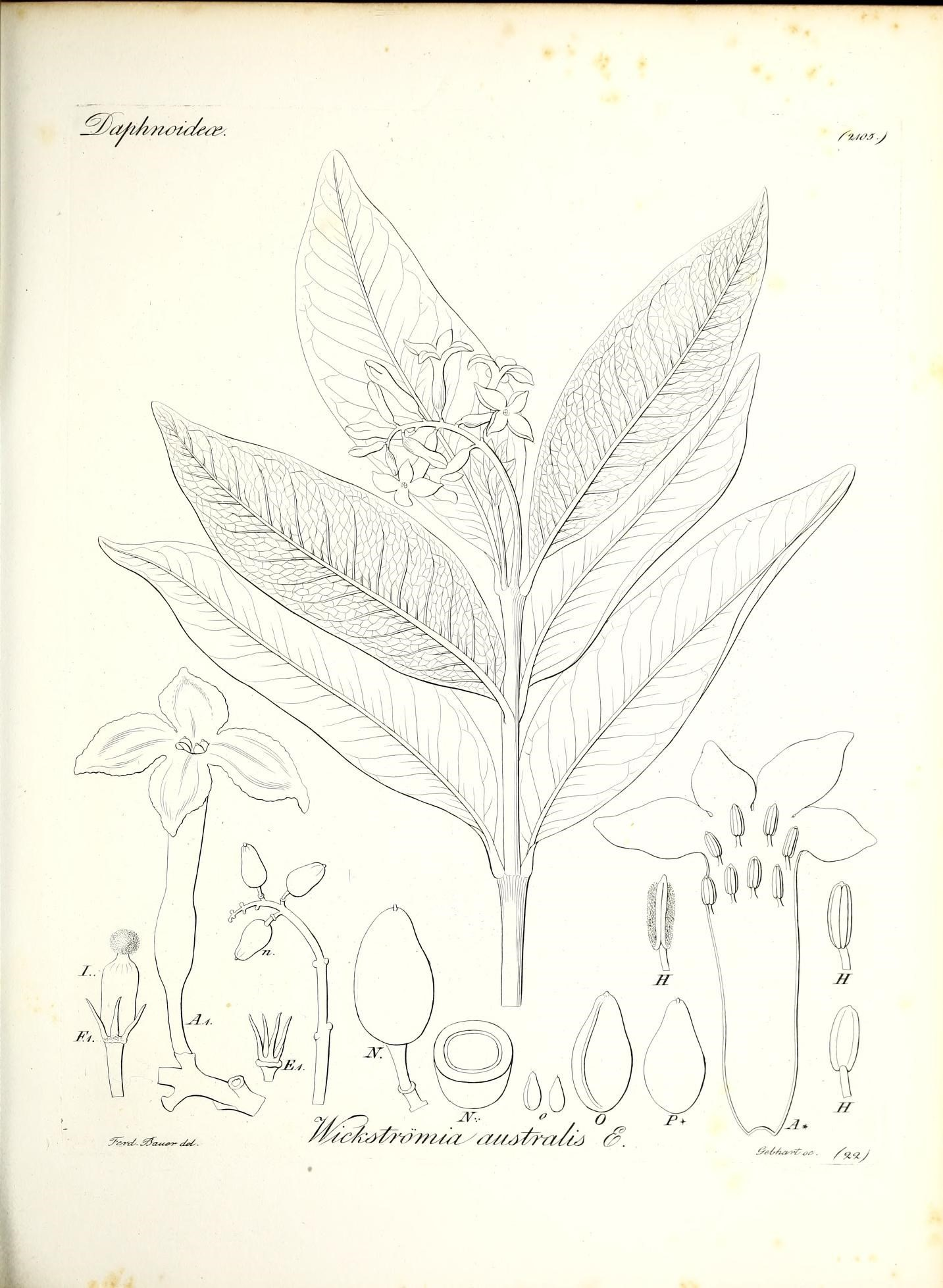

Scientific classification
- Kingdom: Plantae
- Clade: Tracheophytes
- Clade: Angiosperms
- Clade: Eudicots
- Clade: Rosids
- Order: Malvales
- Family: Thymelaeaceae
- Genus: Wikstroemia
- Species: W. australis

Binomial name
- Wikstroemia australis Endl.

= Wikstroemia australis =

Species of shrub

Wikstroemia australis is a shrub, of the family Thymelaeaceae. It is endemic to Norfolk Island.

== Description ==
The shrub is erect and broomlike and grows to at least 4.0 m tall. Its branches are black and have tough bark. Its flowers are tubular and greenish yellow. It is often found in forests, ridges, and canopy gaps.
