= Bonin greenfinch =

Scientific classification
- Domain: Eukaryota
- Kingdom: Animalia
- Phylum: Chordata
- Class: Aves
- Order: Passeriformes
- Family: Fringillidae
- Subfamily: Carduelinae
- Genus: Chloris
- Species: C. kittlitzi

Binomial name
- Chloris kittlitzi (Seebohm, 1890)

Synonyms
- Carduelis sinica kittlitzi Chloris sinica kittlitzi Fringilla kittlitzi (protonym)

Species of bird

The Bonin greenfinch (Chloris kittlitzi), also known as the Ogasawara greenfinch, is a small passerine bird in the finch family Fringillidae that is endemic to the Ogasawara Islands of Japan, where it is found on the Bonin Islands and Volcano Islands. It was formerly considered a subspecies of the grey-capped greenfinch (C. sinica) and some authorities consider it as such, but a 2020 analysis found it likely to represent a distinct species that diverged from C. sinica about 1.06 million years ago, and the International Ornithological Congress now recognizes it as such, making it the eleventh endemic species in Japan (alongside the Copper pheasant (Syrmaticus soemmerringii), Okinawa rail (Hypotaenidia okinawae), Amami woodcock (Scolopax mira), Japanese green woodpecker (Picus awokera), Okinawa woodpecker (Dendrocopos noguchii), Lidth's jay (Garrulus lidthi), Bonin white-eye (Apalopteron familiare), Izu thrush (Turdus celaenops), Ryukyu robin (Larvivora komadori), and Japanese accentor (Prunella rubida)). There are fewer than 400 individuals in the population and it is considered critically endangered by the Japanese government, necessitating protection. According to the Yamashina Institute for Ornithology, as of December 2021, the Ogaswara greenfinch is Japan's most endangered bird.

== Taxonomy ==
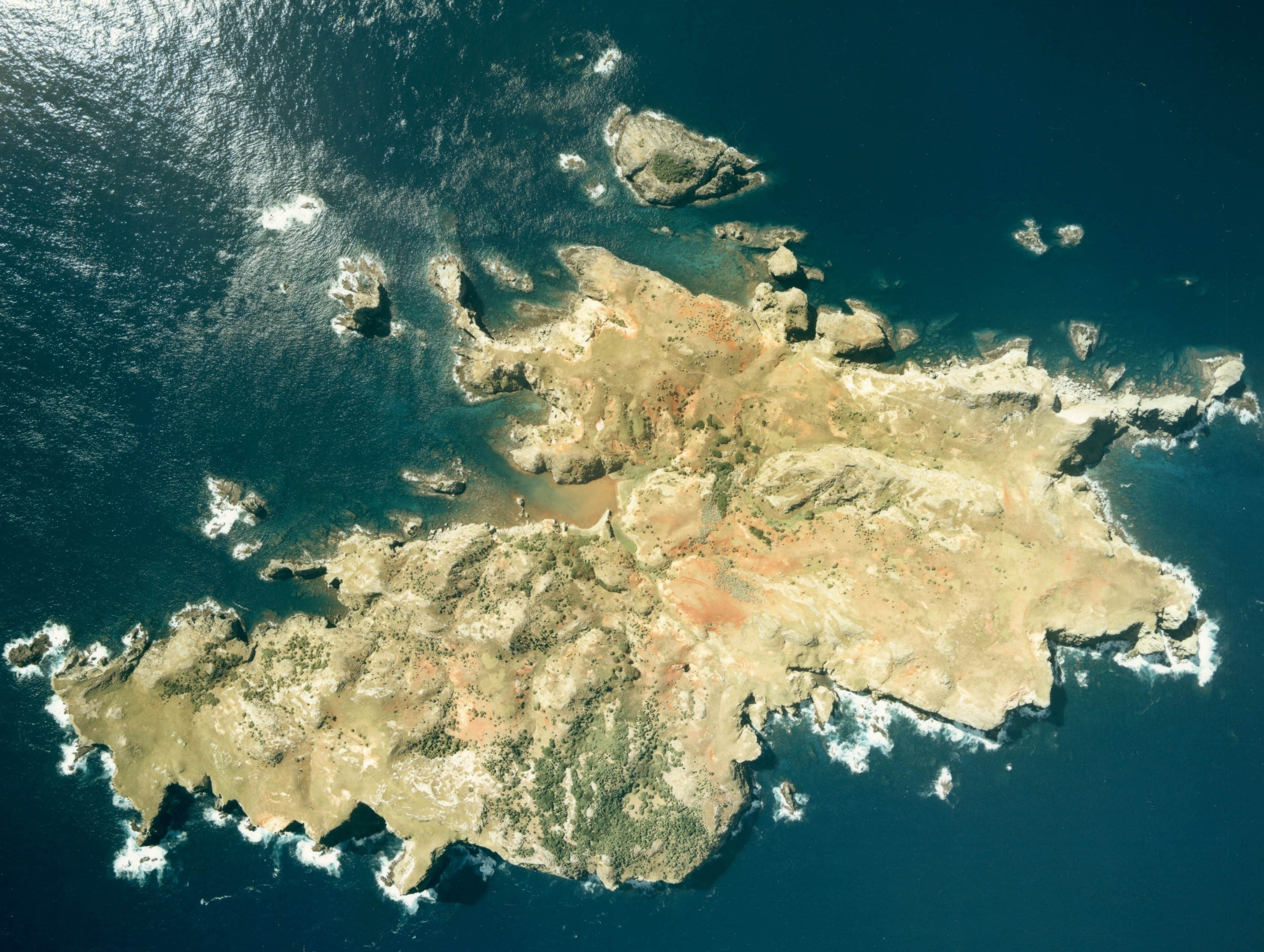
Nakōdo Island in the Muko-jima Islands, the type locality

The presence of the greenfinch on the Bonin Islands was first noted by Kittlitz at the beginning of May 1828 and reported to the Imperial Academy of Sciences in Saint Petersburg in a paper read on 28 April 1830, but he did not distinguish it from the European greenfinch, recording it under the binomial Fringilla chloris. The Bonin Island greenfinch was first described by Henry Seebohm in 1890, as Fringilla kittlitzi. Subsequently treated as a subspecies of the Oriental (or grey-capped) greenfinch, under the trinominal Carduelis sinica kittlitzi or Chloris sinica kittlitzi, a paper of 2020 recommended it again be raised to species rank, as Chloris kittlitzi, and styled the Ogasawara greenfinch. The split was implemented in the IOC World Bird List update of January 2021, in recognition of the "deep genetic divergence" and "morphological differences". There are three syntypes (BNHM 1898.11.1.60) collected on "Nakondo-Shima" [ja], one of the Muko-jima Islands (formerly known as the Parry Islands), on 14 June 1889 in the collection of the Natural History Museum. In its native Japan, the greenfinch goes by the vernacular name Ogasawara-kawarahiwa (オガサワラカワラヒワ), or Oga-hiwa (オガヒワ) for short. Among the Bonin islanders, it as also sometimes known as the kuzaimon (クザイモン).

== Description ==
The Ogasawara greenfinch has a total length of around 13–14 centimetres (5.1–5.5 in) and weighs some 17.5–19.5 grams (0.62–0.69 oz). Compared with the Oriental greenfinch, from which the species has been recently split, the wings are shorter and overall body size smaller, but the beak is longer. In particular, compared with the Japanese greenfinch (Chloris sinica minor), the beak is "longer, deeper, and thicker". In males, the average wing, tail, tarsus, and culmen lengths are a little longer than in females. Like the Oriental greenfinch, the Ogasawara greenfinch is an olive-green, with patches of yellow on the secondaries and tail-feathers, and a pink beak. Seebohm observed that, compared with the Oriental greenfinch, the Ogasawara greenfinch has less yellow, while its crown and nape are olive rather than grey or brown. The males have more vibrant colours.

== Ecology ==
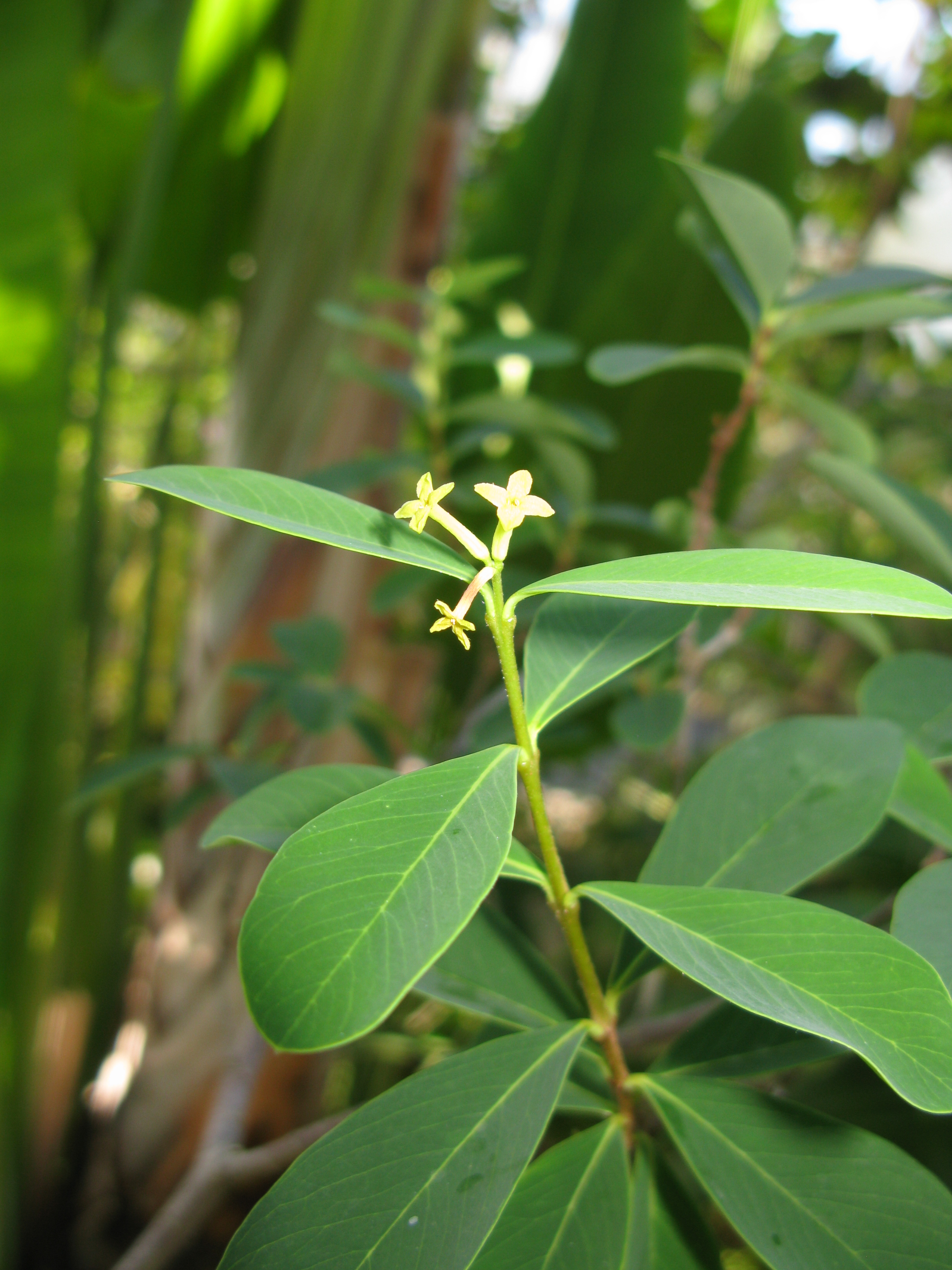
Wikstroemia pseudoretusa seeds are a preferred food source

The main breeding season is from April to June. Clutch sizes, of 3–4 eggs, are smaller than those of the Japanese greenfinch (3–6 eggs), though the eggs themselves are somewhat larger, weighing on average 1.99 grams (0.070 oz) as opposed to 1.8 grams (0.063 oz). Its diet largely comprises seeds, for which it forages both on the ground and in shrubs and trees. Among preferred species are Casuarina equisetifolia (as an alien tree, this has recently been eradicated) and in particular Wikstroemia pseudoretusa; since the seeds of the latter are considerably larger than the grass seeds that comprise the majority of the diet of the Japanese greenfinch, it is thought that the larger beak of the Ogasawara greenfinch has evolved in response.

== Distribution ==
The Ogasawara greenfinch is a non-migratory or resident bird endemic to the Bonin and Iwo Islands. Its preferred habitat for breeding is the dry lowland forest, in particular arid evergreen shrubs with a height of less than 2 metres (6 ft 7 in), and it now breeds only on the small satellite islands around Haha-jima (Mukō-jima, Ane-jima, and Imōto-jima) and South Iwo Jima. Previously it bred also on Muko-jima, Chichi-jima, and Haha-jima. Outside the breeding season, it may be found on islands beyond its breeding grounds, and it forages also in more open spaces, including agricultural land and among the grasses in the settlements of Ogasawara.

== Conservation status ==
Reduced numbers of the then subspecies were already reported at the end of the 1920s. The Ogasawara greenfinch is now extinct in the Muko-jima Islands, Chichi-jima Islands, and North Iwo Jima and Iwo Jima in the Volcano Islands. In response, a Population and Habitat Viability Assessment (PHVA) has been conducted (Japan's fourth after those for the Tsushima leopard cat (Prionailurus bengalensis euptilura), Okinawa rail (Hypotaenidia okinawae), and Japanese wood pigeon (Columba janthina)). As a restricted-range species, it is particularly vulnerable to extreme weather events such as typhoons and localized droughts, while the small population size threatens genetic diversity. The Ogasawara greenfinch only breeds on islands where there are no black rats (Rattus rattus), and the rat's presence is thought to be linked to the local extinctions. Invasive brown rats (Rattus norvegicus) and feral cats (Felis catus) are also linked to predation during periods of foraging on the ground, and management of these mammal species has been recommended, alongside ex situ conservation via a captive breeding programme, to reduce the risk of extinction. It is estimated that the species comprises 200–400 individuals in total, with a breeding population of approximately a hundred birds around Haha-jima and a further hundred birds on South Iwo Jima. In 2020, the breeding population in the Haha-jima Islands was 1/10 of that twenty-five years before. As a subspecies, the Ogasawara greenfinch is classed as Critically Endangered on the Ministry of the Environment Red List, and has been designated a National Endangered Species under the 1992 Act on Conservation of Endangered Species of Wild Fauna and Flora. Extinctions amongst other local restricted-range endemics following human settlement in the nineteenth century include those of the Bonin grosbeak (Carpodacus ferreorostris ), Bonin wood pigeon (Columba versicolor), and Bonin nankeen night heron (Nycticorax caledonicus crassirostris).

== See also ==
- List of birds of Japan
- Ogasawara National Park
