= Wikstroemia hanalei =

Conservation status
- Extinct (IUCN 3.1)

Scientific classification
- Kingdom: Plantae
- Clade: Tracheophytes
- Clade: Angiosperms
- Clade: Eudicots
- Clade: Rosids
- Order: Malvales
- Family: Thymelaeaceae
- Genus: Wikstroemia
- Species: †W. hanalei

Binomial name
- †Wikstroemia hanalei Wawra

Synonyms
- Daphne hanalei (Wawra) Halda; Diplomorpha hanalei (Wawra) A.Heller

Species of shrub

Wikstroemia hanalei, the lavafield false ohelo, is a shrub, of the family Thymelaeaceae. It is native to the Hawaiian Islands, specifically Kauai.

== Description ==
The shrub has an erect habit, and grows small red fruits up to 13 mm long and 6 mm in diameter. It is believed to be extinct as of 1990.
