= Wikstroemia mononectaria =

Scientific classification
- Kingdom: Plantae
- Clade: Tracheophytes
- Clade: Angiosperms
- Clade: Eudicots
- Clade: Rosids
- Order: Malvales
- Family: Thymelaeaceae
- Genus: Wikstroemia
- Species: W. mononectaria

Binomial name
- Wikstroemia mononectaria Hayata

Species of shrub

Wikstroemia mononectaria is a shrub in the family Thymelaeaceae. It is native to Taiwan.

== Description ==
The shrub has black-purple, long, and slender branches.
