= Wikstroemia sinoparviflora =

Scientific classification
- Kingdom: Plantae
- Clade: Tracheophytes
- Clade: Angiosperms
- Clade: Eudicots
- Clade: Rosids
- Order: Malvales
- Family: Thymelaeaceae
- Genus: Wikstroemia
- Species: W. sinoparviflora

Binomial name
- Wikstroemia sinoparviflora Yin Z.Wang & M.G.Gilbert (2007)

Synonyms
- Daphne parviflora Halda (1999); Wikstroemia parviflora S.C.Huang (1985), nom. illeg.

Species of shrub

Wikstroemia sinoparviflora is a shrub in the family Thymelaeaceae. It is native to China, specifically Gansu.

== Description ==
The shrub grows up to 0.2 to 0.5 m tall. Its branches are gray and densely crowded. It is often found on dry shrubby slopes and roadsides at elevations of 1000 to 2000 m.
