= Wikstroemia johnplewsii =

Hiva Oa ohelo

Scientific classification
- Kingdom: Plantae
- Clade: Tracheophytes
- Clade: Angiosperms
- Clade: Eudicots
- Clade: Rosids
- Order: Malvales
- Family: Thymelaeaceae
- Genus: Wikstroemia
- Species: W. johnplewsii

Binomial name
- Wikstroemia johnplewsii W.L. Wagner & Lorence

Synonyms
- Daphne johnplewsii (W.L. Wagner & Lorence) Halda

Species of flowering plant

Wikstroemia johnplewsii, common name Hiva Oa ohelo, is a plant species endemic to the island of Hiva Oa in the Marquesas Islands, French Polynesia. It is found at relatively high altitudes in the mountains, at elevations over 600 m. The only other member of the genus reported from the Marquesas is W. coriacea (sometimes erroneously called W. foetida). Wikstroemia coriacea has narrower leaves and smaller inflorescences than. W. johnplewsii.

Wikstroemia johnplewsii is a shrub or small tree up to 5 m tall. Leaves are sessile (=without petioles), thick and leathery, dark green on upper surface but much lighter below, elliptic to broadly ovate, up to 8 cm long. Peduncles are usually 12–32 mm long, sometimes up to 40 mm. Inflorescence is an elongate raceme up to 40 mm long at flowering time, with 9-27 flowers. Flowers are tubular, greenish-yellow, up to 9 mm long.

The species is named for NTBG (National Tropical Botanical Garden) contributor John Harry Rice Plews, who funded much of the field research.
