= Aburatorigami =

Japanese facial blotting paper

Aburatorigami (あぶらとり紙, lit. 'oil removal paper') is a traditional Japanese facial oil blotting paper. Aburatorigami absorbs excess oil, thereby eliminating shine from the face. Aburatorigami has traditionally been used by kabuki actors and geisha when wearing oshiroi (traditional white makeup), to keep makeup looking fresh throughout performances.

In modern times it has been growing in popularity for everyday use amongst women and men for its various skincare and makeup benefits. Aburatorigami also works well to keep the balance of water and oil in the skin and prevents skin problems.

== Production ==
Traditional aburatorigami is made from only the finest grade of the blotting paper abaca leaf, rather than pulp or Japanese tissue. Although sometimes known as Manila hemp, Cebu hemp, or Davao hemp, the abaca plant is not related to true hemp. The Philippine Bureau of Fiber and Inspection Service defines a total of 15 grades of abaca, the highest of which are derived from the leaf sheaths located closest to the center of the abaca stem.

Aburatorigami is essentially a by-product of the gold-leaf production process, effectively using material that might otherwise be thrown away. After aburatorigami is used, it can be composted and degraded naturally back into the earth. No oil-based chemicals are used in its production. As a result, aburatorigami has relatively low environmental impact.

== History ==
Aburatorigami was discovered for its oil-absorbing qualities several hundred years ago but was effectively present as a by-product of the gold leaf making process over a thousand years ago in Kyoto. Originally called hakuuchi-gami, gold leaf artisans in Kanazawa used this specialty paper to protect the gold during the vigorous goldbeating technique.

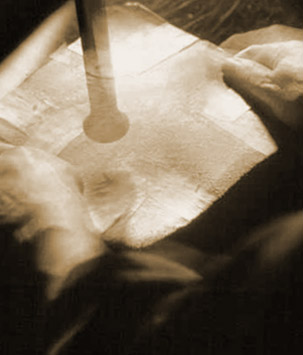
Goldbeating

During the Heian period (794–1192 CE), the demand was extremely high, as gold was used in decorating temples and in providing the emperor and the nobility with high-quality furnishings and crafts. Thus, much hakuuchi-gami was taken to Kyoto as wrapping for delicate gold leaf.

During the Edo period (1603–1867), its popularity spread as its notability for absorbing oil and refreshing the complexion grew.

== Usage ==
During the Edo period, Minamiza, the first kabuki theater of Japan, was built in Kyoto in 1610. The kabuki actors, like geisha, were especially grateful to have a product that would help keep their thick makeup on while absorbing excess oil and sweat, for their performances in non-air-conditioned theaters. As a result, the culture of aburatorigami began to flourish in Kyoto.

Aburatorigami were given to geisha in Kyoto as a small present by the gold artisans who would linger around the teahouses, the exclusive establishments also known as ochaya. Geisha wore thick white foundation with limited time to touch up their makeup during performances. Geisha would also use aburatorigami to prepare and set their makeup, as they would commonly entertain for hours.

== See also ==
- Oshibori
- Oshiroi
- Kumadori
