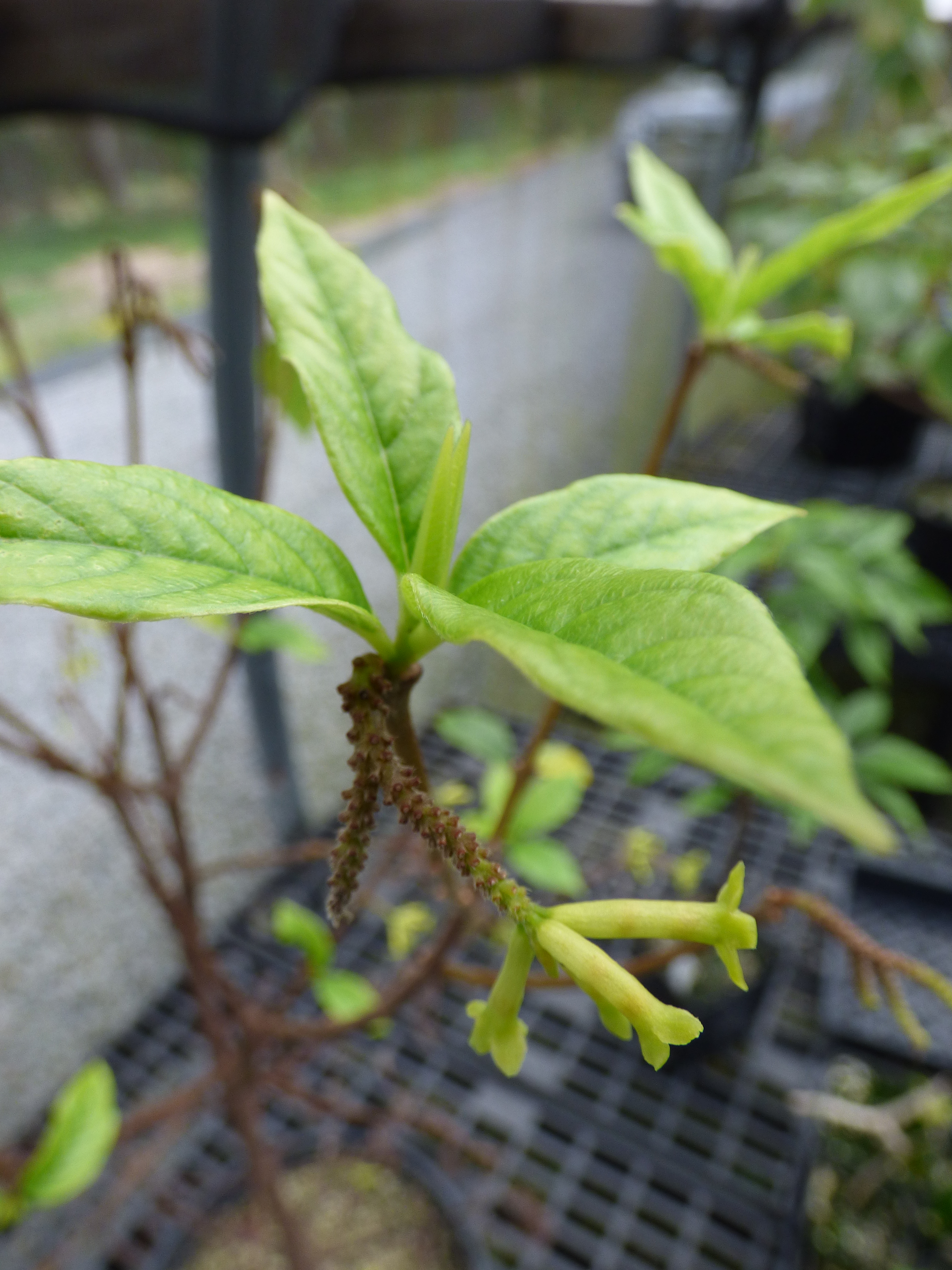

Conservation status
- Critically Endangered (IUCN 3.1)

Scientific classification
- Kingdom: Plantae
- Clade: Tracheophytes
- Clade: Angiosperms
- Clade: Eudicots
- Clade: Rosids
- Order: Malvales
- Family: Thymelaeaceae
- Genus: Wikstroemia
- Species: W. villosa

Binomial name
- Wikstroemia villosa Hillebr.

= Wikstroemia villosa =

Species of flowering plant

Wikstroemia villosa, the hairy wikstroemia or hairy false ohelo, is a tropical species of plant in the Thymelaeaceae family.

== Distribution ==
It is endemic to the island of Maui in Hawaiʻi. It was known from montane rainforests on the windward side of Haleakalā volcano on East Maui the ridges in Wailuku Valley on West Maui.

Conservation

Wikstroemia villosa is currently classified as "critically endangered" (CR) by IUCN (since September 2016).

It was once thought to have become extinct due to habitat loss, and has been classified as an extinct species on the IUCN Red List from 1998 to 2016.

However, it was rediscovered in 2007 with the discovery of one plant on the windward side of Haleakalā in Haleakalā National Park on East Maui. As of 2010, there was one plant and one seedling at the discovery location. In addition, 3 plants have been outplanted at the Waikamoi Preserve. The US Fish and Wildlife Service has recently proposed to list this plant as an endangered species. In the IUCN's report in 2016, 49 mature individuals in 5 subpopulations were confirmed.
