= Japanese tissue =

Thin, strong paper made from vegetable fibers

Some Japanese tissues

Japanese tissue, colloquially known by the misnomer rice paper, is a thin, strong paper made from vegetable fibers. Japanese tissue may be made from one of three plants, the kōzo plant (Broussonetia papyrifera, paper mulberry tree), the mitsumata (Edgeworthia chrysantha) shrub and the gampi tree (Diplomorpha sikokiana). The long, strong fibers of the kōzo plant produce very strong, dimensionally stable papers, and are the most commonly used fibers in the making of Japanese paper (washi). Tissue made from kōzo, or kōzogami (楮紙), comes in varying thicknesses and colors, and is an ideal paper to use in the mending of books. The majority of mending tissues are made from kōzo fibers, though mitsumata and gampi papers also are used. Japanese tissue is also an ideal material for kites and the covering of airplane models.

== Forms ==
The kōzo plant is used in the manufacture of the following papers:

Paper	Composition kōzo (%)	Description and use
Goyu	90	Mainly for printing and for the hinges of mounting paper materials.
Hosokawa ohban	100	Heavier than other Japanese papers and is used as a backing for documents and maps
Kaji	100	Lightweight paper used for conservation processes
Kizukushi	100	Used for mending
Misu	100	Used in conservation processes
Okawara	100	Used in conservation processes
Sekishu Mare and Sekishu Bashi Tsuru	100	Used for printmaking and in conservation. It has been designated by UNESCO as an Intangible Cultural Asset of Humanity.
Sekishu kōzogami mare	100	Used in mending
Sekishu kōzogami turu	100	Used for all types of mending
Udagami	100	Used for mending artworks on paper.

The gampi plant is used in the manufacture of the following papers:

Paper	Composition	Description and use
Sekishu Torinoko Gampi	100% gampi	Soft, silky, glazed appearance. Used for mending and conservation of artworks on paper.

The mitsumata plant is used in the manufacture of the following papers:

Paper	Composition	Description and use
Kitakata	Salago (Philippine Gampi)	Silky, creamy tone, with a sheen. It is used for printmaking.

== Manufacture ==
Japanese tissue paper is a handmade paper. The inner bark of the kōzo plant is harvested in the fall and spring, with material from the fall harvest being considered better quality. Bundles of kōzo sticks are steamed in a cauldron, then stripped of their bark and hung in the sun to dry. At this stage in the process, it is known as kuro-kawa, or black bark.

To make paper, the black bark must be converted into white bark. The stored black bark is soaked and then scraped by hand with a knife to remove the black outer coat. It is then washed in water and again placed in the sun to dry.

White bark is boiled with lye for about an hour, then left to steam for several more hours. At this point, it is rinsed with clear water to remove the lye. Then, it is stream-bleached (川ざらし, kawa zarashi). (Note: Stream bleaching in January 寒ざらし (Samu zarashi) produces a higher quality paper) The fibers are placed in a stream bed around which a dam is built. Clean water is let in periodically to wash the fibers. Alternatively, the fibers may be bleached using a process called small bleaching (ko-arai). In this case, it is first placed on boards and beaten with rods before being placed in a cloth bag and rinsed in clear running water.

Impurities are removed after bleaching though a process known as chiri-tori. Any remaining pieces of bark, hard fibers or other impurities are picked out by hand or, in the case of very small pieces, by the use of pins. The remaining material is rolled into little balls and the balls are then beaten to crush the fibers.

After being beaten, it is common for the kōzo fibers to be mixed with neri, which is a mucilaginous material made from the roots of the tororo-aoi plant. The neri makes the fibers float uniformly on water and also helps to "...slow the speed of drainage so that a better-formed sheet of paper will result." (Narita, p. 45)

A solution of 30 percent pulp and 70 percent water is then mixed together in a vat. Neri may also be added to the vat. Nagashi-zuki, the most common technique for making sheets of paper, is then employed. The mixture is scooped on a screen and allowed to flow back and forth across the screen to interlock the fibers. This process is ideal for forming thin sheets of paper. The other technique for making paper, tame-zuki, does not use neri and forms thicker sheets of paper.

The sheet of paper is placed on a wooden board and dried overnight, then pressed the next day to remove water. After pressing, the sheets are put on a drying board and brushed to smooth them. They are dried in the sun, then removed from the drying board and trimmed.

== Uses ==
Japanese tissue is used in the conservation of books and manuscripts. The tissue comes in varying thicknesses and colors, and is used for a variety of mending tasks, including repairing tears, mending book hinges, and reinforcing the folds of signatures or for reinforcement of an entire sheet through backing. The mender will select a piece of Japanese tissue that closely matches the color of the paper being mended, and chooses a thickness (weight) suitable to the job at hand.

=== Mending tears ===
First, Japanese tissue in a color close to that of the paper to be mended is chosen. The tear is aligned and paste may be used on any overlapping surfaces in the tear to help hold it together during the mending process.

A strip of tissue is torn away from the main sheet using a water tear. This is done by wetting the paper along the area to be torn and then pulling sideways with the fingers to separate the strip from the rest of the sheet of tissue, so that it will have feathered edges. The fibers in these feathered edges will allow the tissue to have a firmer hold on the mended paper and also to blend in with it once dried.

Paste is applied to one side of the tissue strip, from the center outward. The tissue is then placed, paste side down, on the tear, leaving a little bit of the mending tissue hanging over the edge. This bit will be trimmed off after the mend dries. A dry brush is used to smooth the tissue over the tear, again from the center outward. The mended page is placed between layers of PET film or glass board, blotting paper, and Reemay (a "spunbonded polyester" cloth) to keep the paste from sticking to the blotting paper, and then lightly weighted and left to dry.

=== Mending book hinges ===
This is another task in which Japanese tissue is often used. In some cases, the first step may be to tip in (that is, add with a thin strip of adhesive) a flyleaf to become the base for the attachment of the hinge mend, if the original flyleaf is not well attached. A small support the height of the spine should be placed to eliminate stress on the hinge.

Japanese tissue should be water torn in the same process as described above, in a width and length sufficient to cover the hinge of the book with about 3/8 inch extension over the sides. Paste should be brushed on to the tissue, from the center outward, transferred to the hinge and then brushed down with a dry brush.

A sheet of PET film is placed to prevent the hinge from sticking together and it is weighted until it dries.

=== Reattaching signatures ===
In the case where an entire signature (a folded sheet of paper forming several pages, or leaves, of a book) has come out, it may be reinserted by being sewn first onto a strip of Japanese paper, and then by pasting into the book along the newly formed hinge between the Japanese paper and original signature.

=== Kite making ===
The washi paper, as long as bamboo sticks and silk, is the most important material to build kites. The use of this material dates back for centuries in the eastern cultures.

=== Aeromodelling ===
Washi paper is used for covering the frame and wings of airplane models since the beginning of the 19th century. It is used especially on small models for the strength and the light weight. The vast majority of the washi paper used is either abaca or wood pulp. Abaca is vastly superior to wood pulp papers in strength overall. Gampi and mitsumata can be hit or miss with wet strength. Even with abaca, if a wet strengthening agent is not added to the fiber, it can almost melt in water.

== See also ==
- Preservation (library and archival science)
- Japanese paper
  - Aburatorigami
- Paper mulberry
