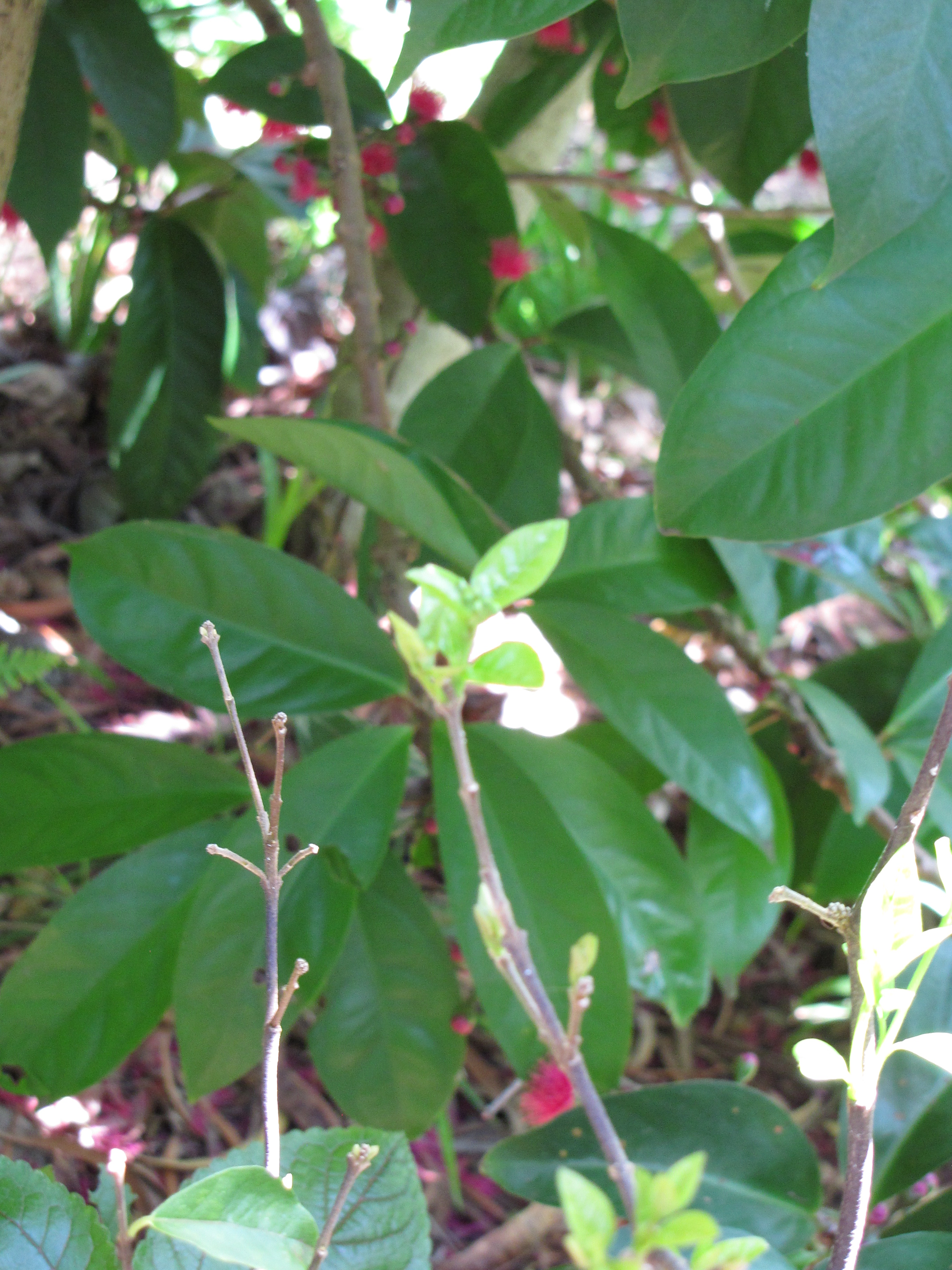

Conservation status
- Endangered (IUCN 2.3)

Scientific classification
- Kingdom: Plantae
- Clade: Tracheophytes
- Clade: Angiosperms
- Clade: Eudicots
- Clade: Rosids
- Order: Malvales
- Family: Thymelaeaceae
- Genus: Wikstroemia
- Species: W. bicornuta

Binomial name
- Wikstroemia bicornuta Hillebr.

= Wikstroemia bicornuta =

Species of flowering plant

Wikstroemia bicornuta, the alpine false ohelo, is a species of flowering plant in the mezereon family, Thymelaeaceae, that is endemic to Hawaii. It inhabits mixed mesic and wet forests at elevations of 900–1,050 m (2,950–3,440 ft) on the islands of Lānaʻi and Maui. It is threatened by habitat loss.
