= Wikstroemia techinensis =

Scientific classification
- Kingdom: Plantae
- Clade: Tracheophytes
- Clade: Angiosperms
- Clade: Eudicots
- Clade: Rosids
- Order: Malvales
- Family: Thymelaeaceae
- Genus: Wikstroemia
- Species: W. techinensis

Binomial name
- Wikstroemia techinensis S.C. Huang

Species of shrub

Wikstroemia techinensis is a shrub in the family Thymelaeaceae. It is found in China, specifically Yunnan.

== Description ==
The shrub grows to a height of up to 1.5 meters. It grows flowers in clusters of 2 to 4, which bloom during summer. Its fruit is unseen. It grows at an altitude of around 3400 meters.
