= Wikstroemia trichotoma =

Scientific classification
- Kingdom: Plantae
- Clade: Tracheophytes
- Clade: Angiosperms
- Clade: Eudicots
- Clade: Rosids
- Order: Malvales
- Family: Thymelaeaceae
- Genus: Wikstroemia
- Species: W. trichotoma

Binomial name
- Wikstroemia trichotoma (Thunb.) Makino

Species of shrub

Wikstroemia trichotoma is a shrub in the family Thymelaeaceae. It is evergreen, and is found in eastern Asia, specifically Anhui, Guangdong, Guangxi, Hunan, Jiangxi, and Zhejiang.

== Description ==
The shrub grows to a height of 0.5 to 2.5 meters. It flowers during the summer, and grows at an altitude of around 600 meters.
