= Washi =

Japanese paper traditionally made from mulberry tree bark

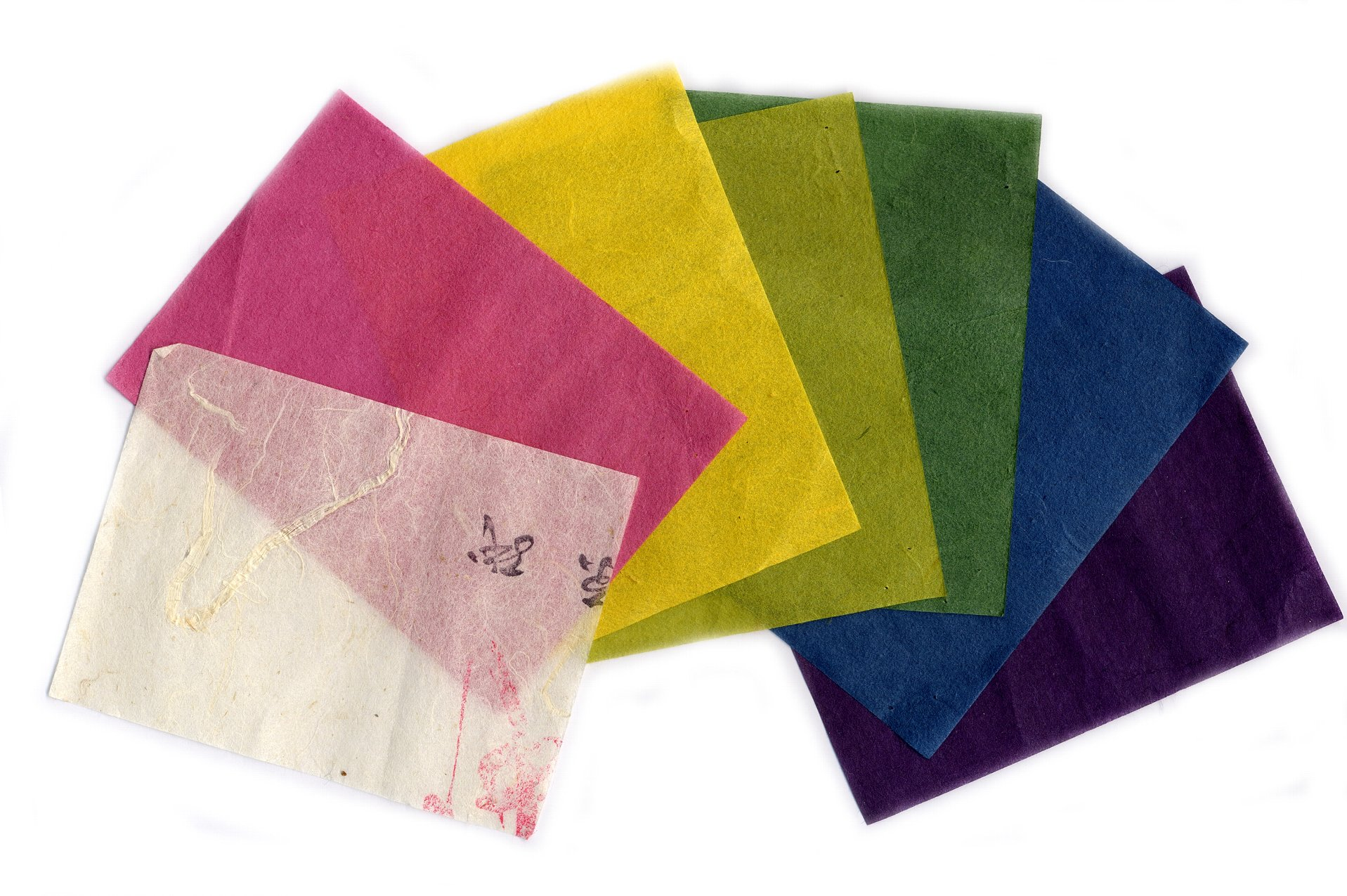
- Sugiharagami (杉原紙), a kind of washi
- Type: Paper
- Material: Fibers from the inner bark of the gampi tree, the mitsumata shrub, or the paper mulberry bush.
- Production process: Craft production
- Place of origin: Japan
- Introduced: 7th century

Washi, craftsmanship of traditional Japanese hand-made paper
- UNESCO Intangible Cultural Heritage
- Country: Japan
- Reference: 02291
- Region: Asia and the Pacific

Inscription history
- Inscription: 2014 (9th session)
- List: Representative

Washi (和紙) is traditional Japanese paper processed by hand using fibers from the inner bark of the gampi tree, the mitsumata shrub (Edgeworthia chrysantha), or the paper mulberry (kōzo) bush. Washi is used in many traditional Japanese arts, such as origami, shodō, and ukiyo-e. It was traditionally used to make various everyday goods like clothes, household goods, and toys, as well as vestments and ritual objects for Shinto priests and statues of Buddhas. It was even used to make wreaths that were given to winners in the 1998 Winter Paralympics. As a Japanese craft, it is registered as a UNESCO intangible cultural heritage.

Because it is usually tougher than Western paper made from wood pulp, washi is often used to repair historically valuable cultural properties, paintings, and books at museums and libraries around the world, such as the Louvre and the Vatican Museums, because of its thinness, pliability, durability over 1000 years due to its low impurities, and high workability to remove it cleanly with moisture.

== History ==
By the 7th century, paper had been introduced to Japan from China via the Korean Peninsula, and the Japanese developed washi by improving the method of making paper in the Heian period. The paper making technique developed in Japan around 805 to 809 was called nagashi-suki (流し漉き), a method of adding mucilage to the process of the conventional tame-suki (溜め漉き) technique to form a stronger layer of paper fibers. The improved washi came to be used to decorate religious ceremonies such as gohei, ōnusa (ja:大麻 (神道)), and shide at Shinto shrines, and in the Heian period, washi covered with gold and silver leaf beautifully decorated books such as Kokin Wakashu.

In the Muromachi period, washi came to be used as ceremonial origami for samurai class at weddings and when giving gifts, and from the Sengoku period to the Edo period, recreational origami such as orizuru developed. During the Edo period, many books and ukiyo-e prints for the masses made of washi were published using woodblock printing.

== Manufacture ==
Washi is produced in a way similar to that of ordinary paper, but relies heavily on manual methods. It involves a long and intricate process that is often undertaken in the cold weather of winter, as pure, cold running water is essential to the production of washi. Cold inhibits bacteria, preventing the decomposition of the fibres. Cold also makes the fibres contract, producing a crisp feel to the paper. It is traditionally the winter work of farmers, a task that supplemented a farmer's income.

Paper mulberry is the most commonly used fiber in making Japanese paper. The mulberry branches are boiled and stripped of their outer bark, and then dried. The fibers are then boiled with lye to remove the starch, fat and tannin, and then placed in running water to remove the spent lye. The fibers are then bleached (either with chemicals or naturally, by placing them in a protected area of a stream) and any remaining impurities in the fibers are picked out by hand. The product is laid on a rock or board and beaten.

Wet balls of pulp are mixed in a vat with water and a formation aid to help keep the long fibers spread evenly. This is traditionally neri, which is a mucilaginous material made from the roots of the tororo aoi plant, or PEO, polyethylene oxide. One of two traditional methods of paper making (nagashi-zuki or tame-zuki) is employed. In both methods, pulp is scooped onto a screen and shaken to spread the fibers evenly. Nagashi-zuki (which uses neri in the vat) produces a thinner paper, while tame-zuki (which does not use neri) produces a thicker paper.

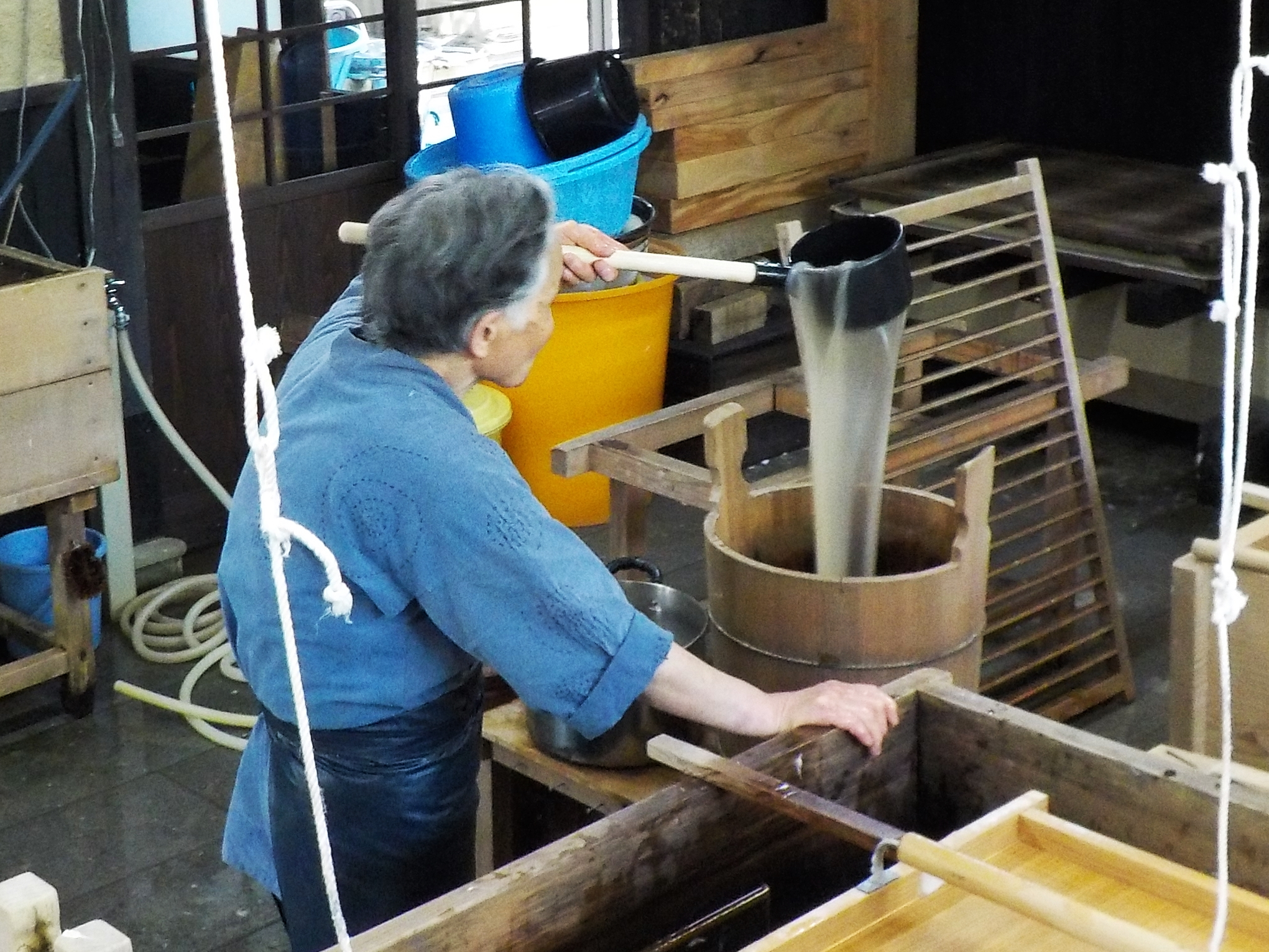
Preparing the liquid. Washi-making at Echizen, Fukui Prefecture

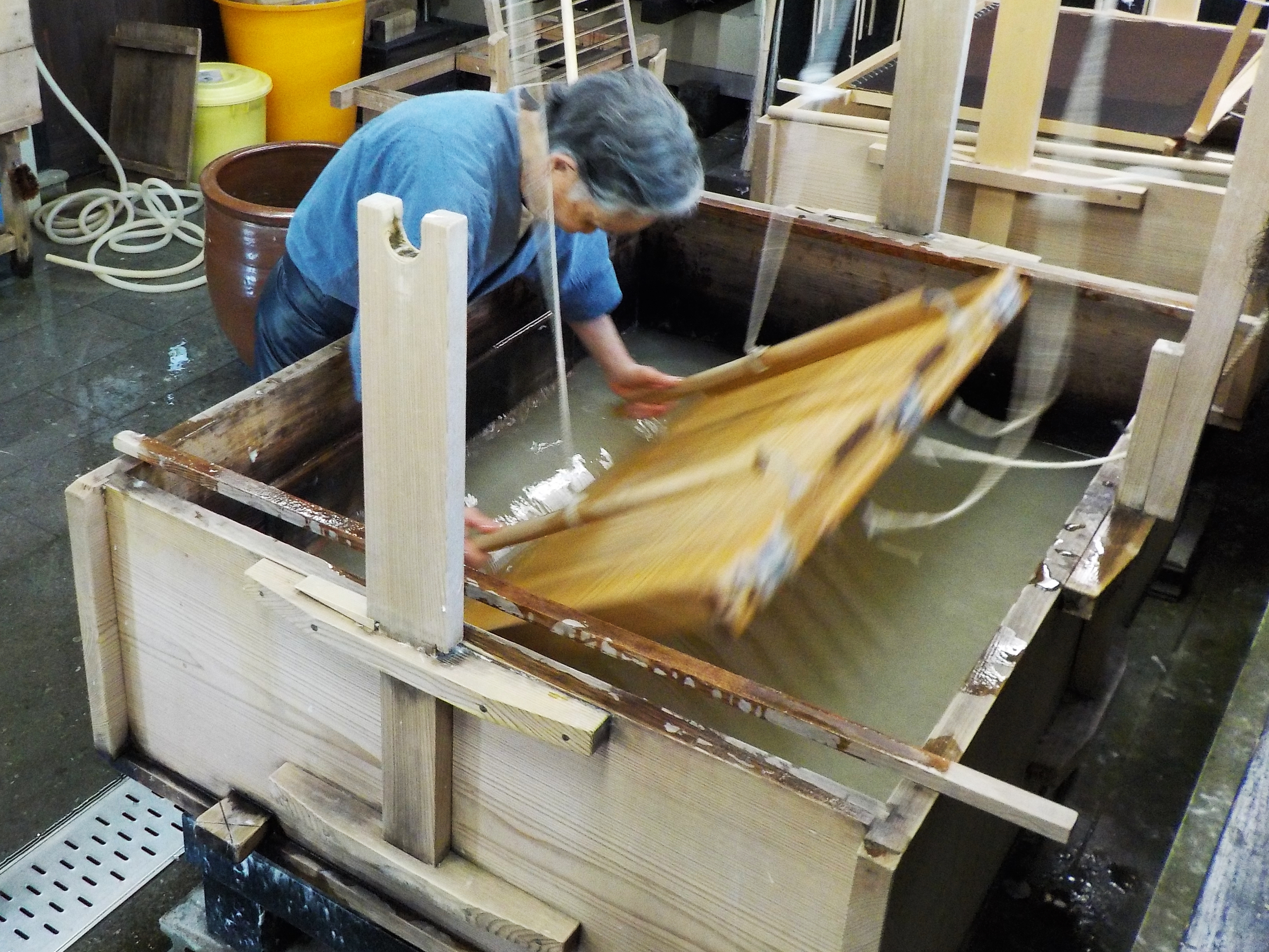
Pulp is scooped onto a screen.

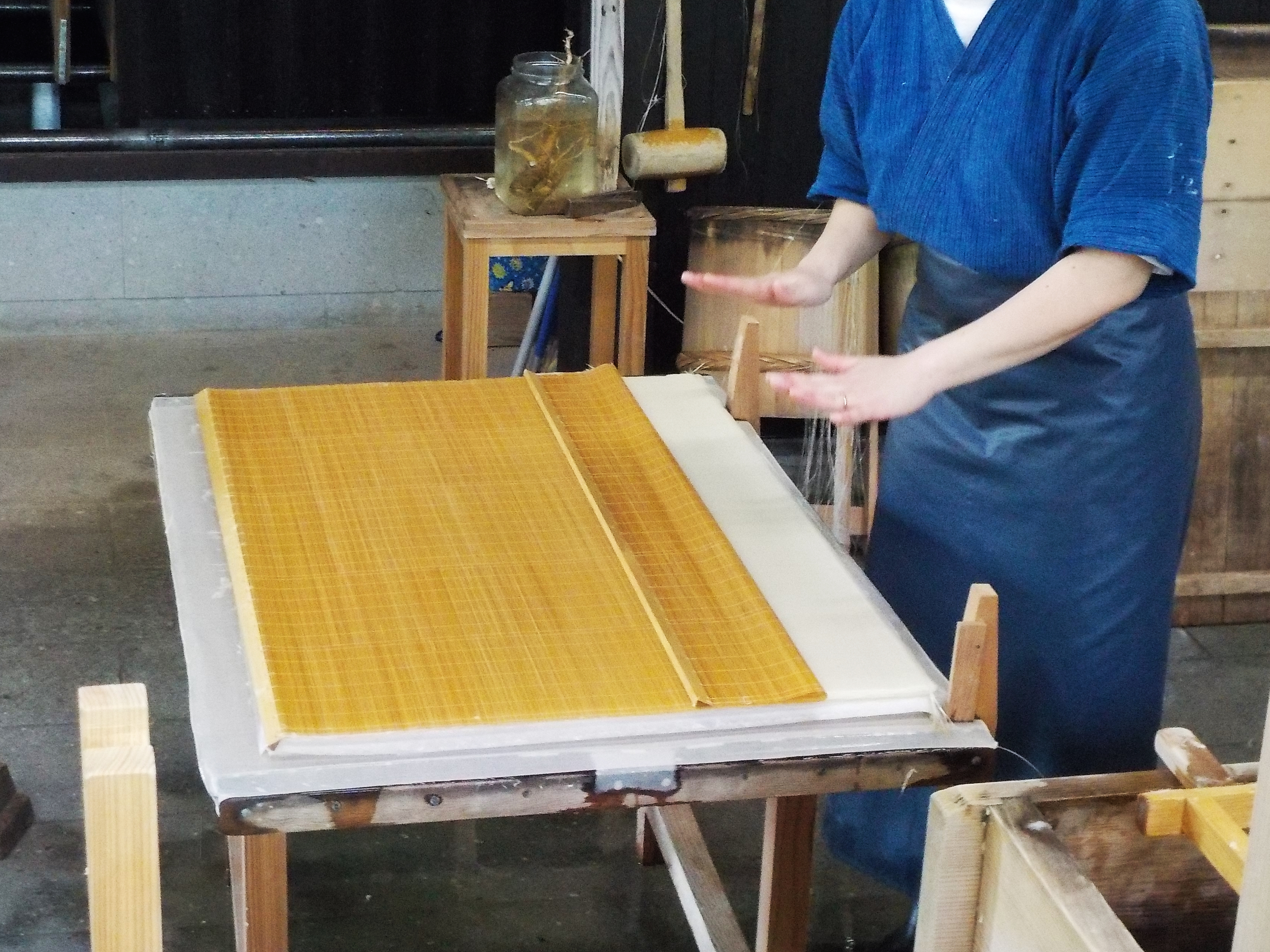
The papermaker carefully stacks each wet sheet of pulp left on the screen one by one.

== Types ==
With enough processing, almost any grass or tree can be made into a washi. Gampi, mitsumata, and paper mulberry are three popular sources.

- Ganpishi (雁皮紙): In ancient times, it was called Hishi (斐紙). Ganpishi has a smooth, shiny surface and is used for books and crafts.
- Kōzogami (楮紙): Kōzogami is made from paper mulberry and is the most widely made type of washi. It has a toughness closer to cloth than to ordinary paper and does not weaken significantly when treated to be water-resistant.
- Mitsumatagami (三椏紙): Made from mitsumata, mitsumatagami has an ivory-colored, fine surface and is used for shodō as well as printing. It has been used to print paper money since the Meiji period and continues to be used today.

== Use, applications ==
In a washitsu (traditional Japanese room), the paper used—whether in the past or in the present—is essentially all washi, traditional Japanese paper, including the paper on shōji(ja:障子) and fusuma(襖) sliding doors, the paper on andon lanterns, the paper of kake-jiku (掛軸, hanging scrolls), and the kaishi (懐紙) used in tea ceremonies(茶道).

In Japanese suibokuga(水墨画), sumi-e (墨絵, ink painting), ukiyo-e and nihonga (traditional Japanese painting), washi is still used even today.

In Japanese calligraphy (shodō, 書道), washi is still widely used today.

Washi is also used in watch dials.

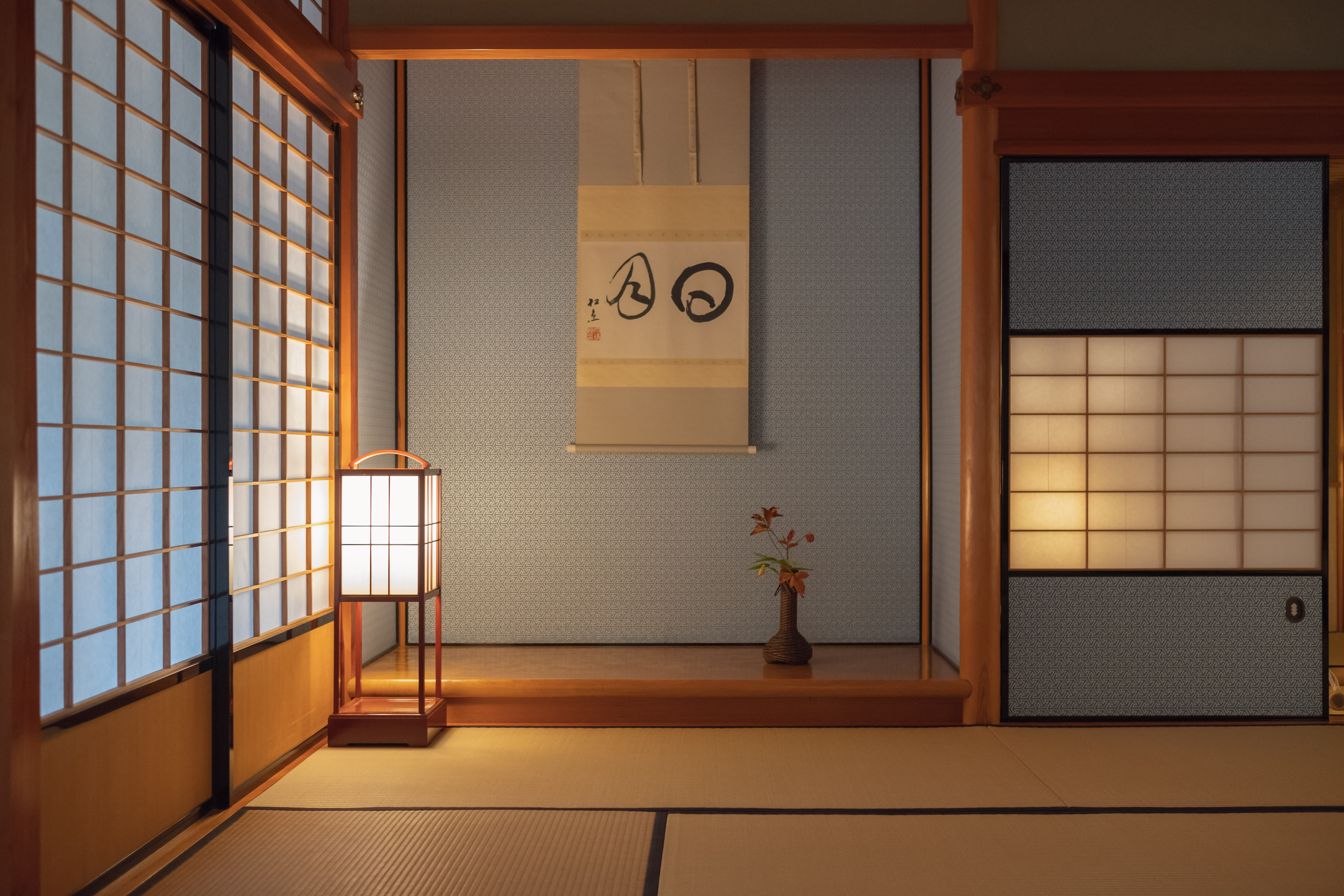
All of the paper visible in this photo—the shōji screens, the andon lantern covers, and the kake-jiku (掛軸, hanging scroll)—is made from washi (traditional Japanese paper)

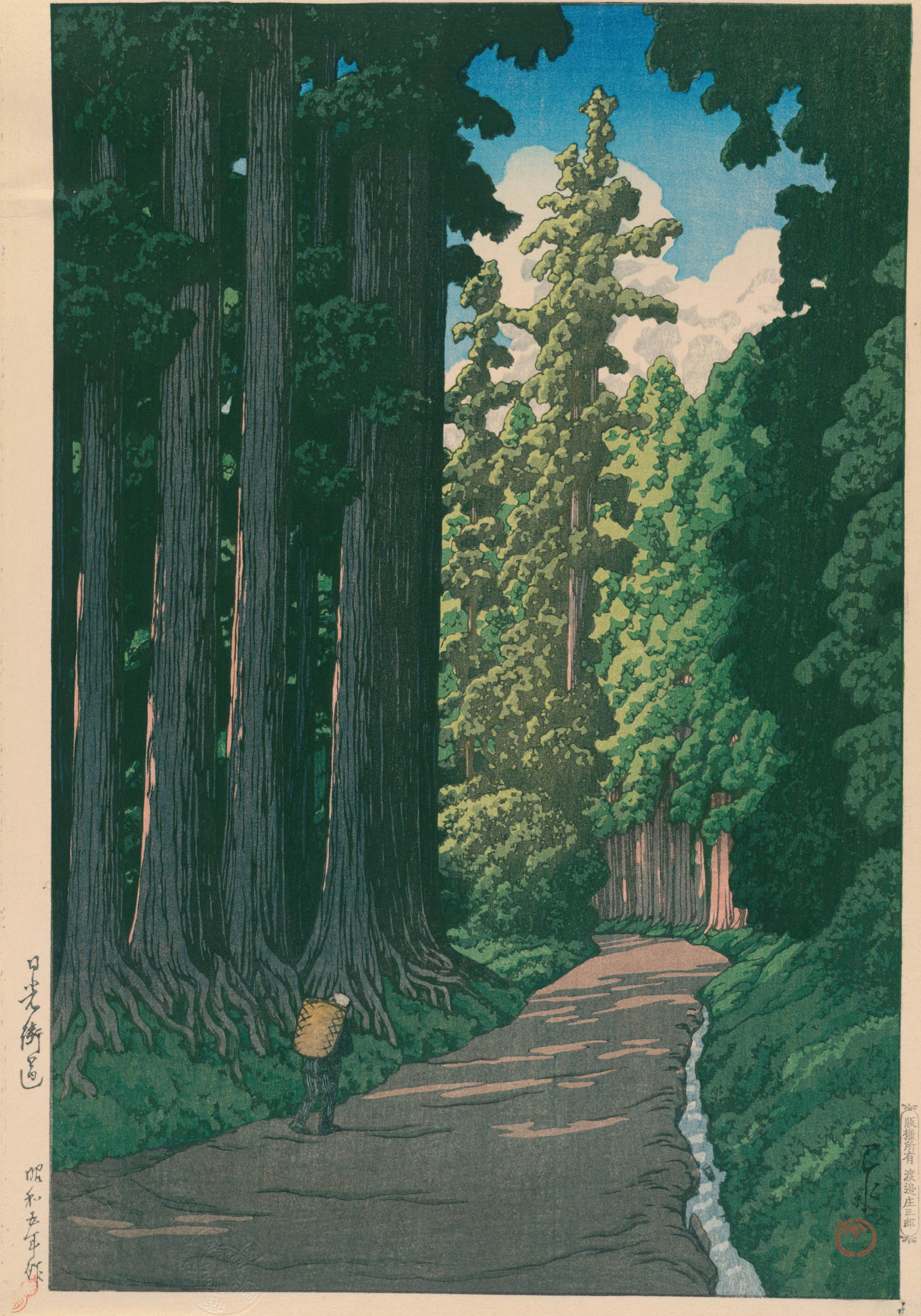
Hasui Kawase (ja:川瀬巴水) chose Echizen-washi as the paper for printing his works.

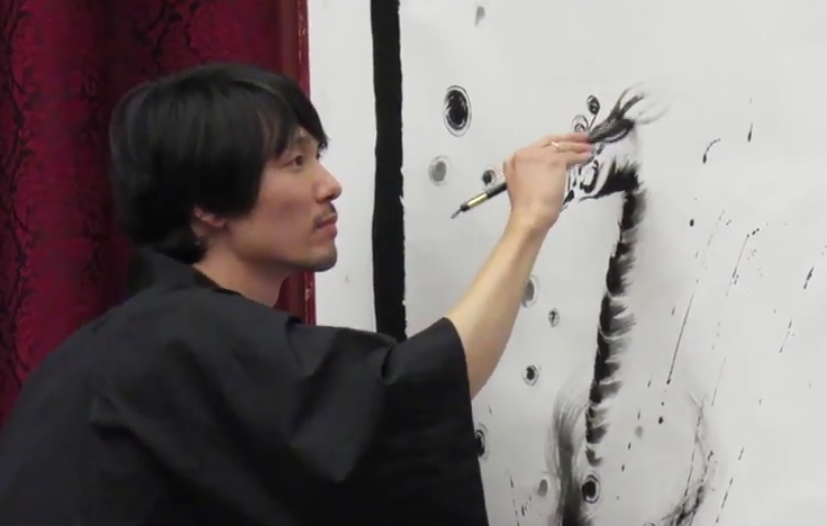
Sumi-e

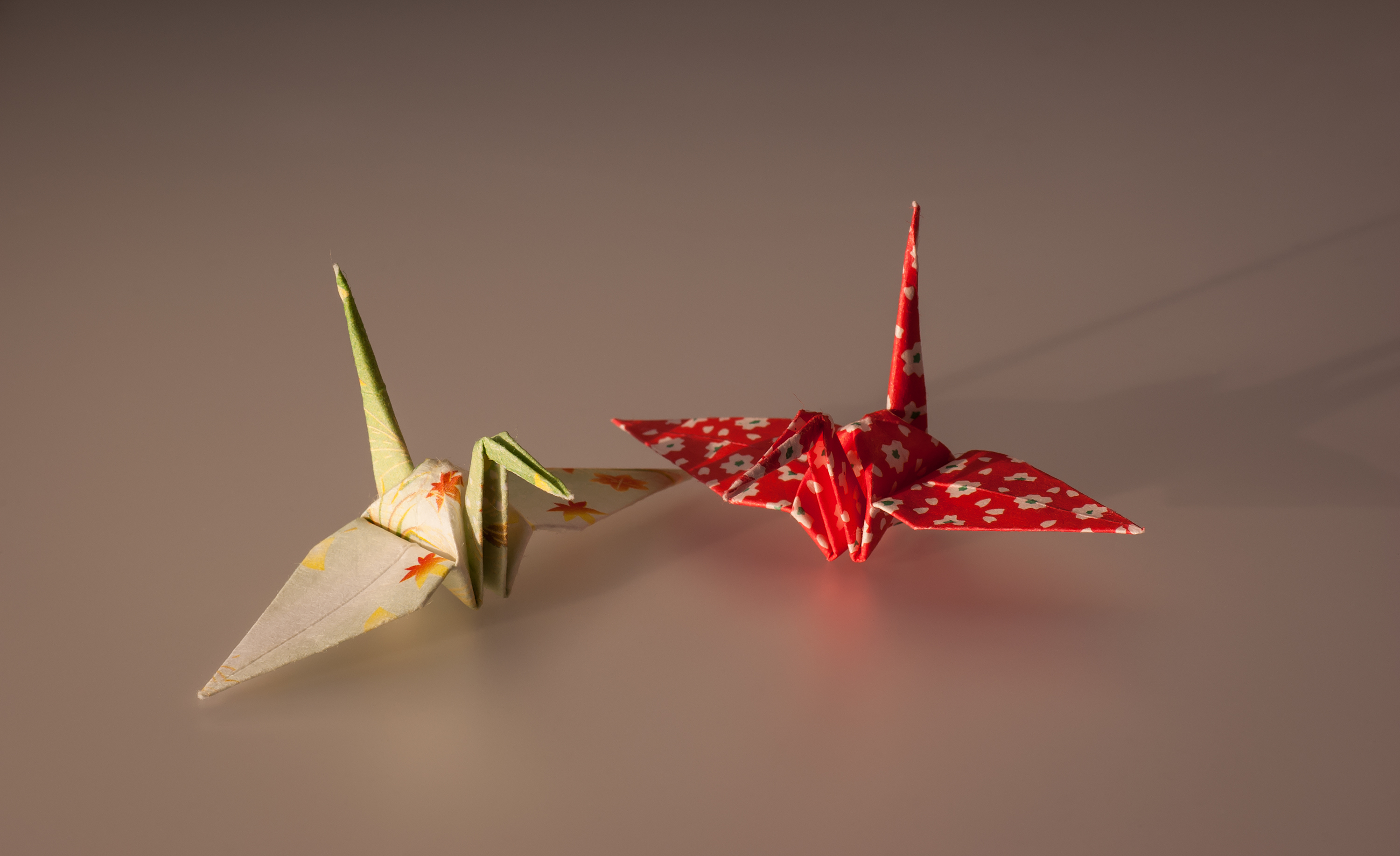
Origami cranes made of washi

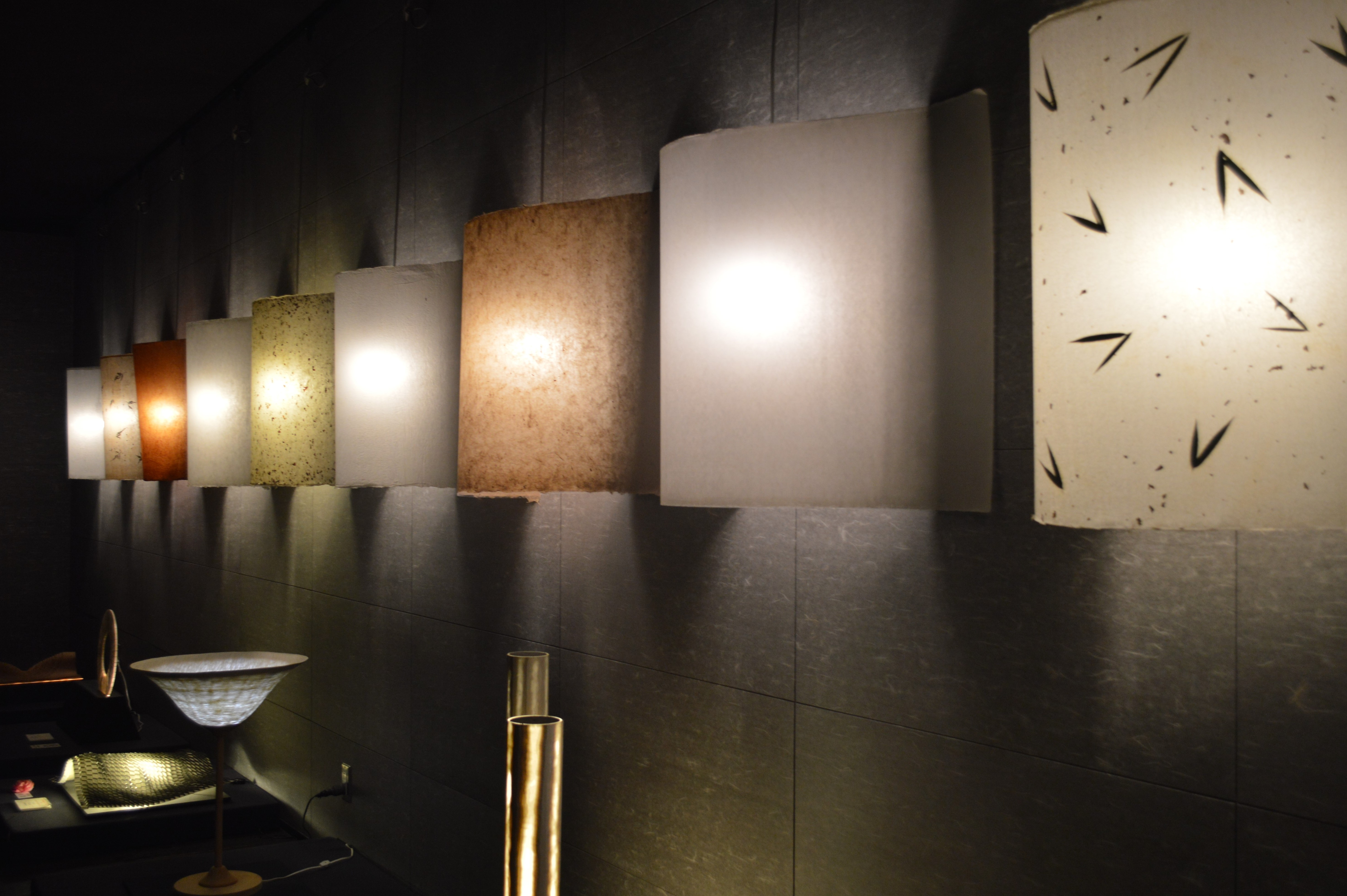
Modern application of Mino washi

== Misnomer: "Rice paper" ==
The traditional Japanese paper washi is often mistranslated or mislabeled in English as "rice paper", a term that has caused misunderstanding in English-speaking countries.

By contrast, in other languages and cultural contexts—such as French—washi is properly referred to as "papier Japon", terms that more accurately convey its identity as Japanese paper without implying an incorrect ingredient.

== See also ==
- Ukiyo-e
- kaishi(ja:懐紙)
- Japanese tissue
- List of Traditional Crafts of Japan
- Genkō yōshi
- Sir Harry Parkes
- Tissue paper
