= Wikstroemia gracilis =

Scientific classification
- Kingdom: Plantae
- Clade: Tracheophytes
- Clade: Angiosperms
- Clade: Eudicots
- Clade: Rosids
- Order: Malvales
- Family: Thymelaeaceae
- Genus: Wikstroemia
- Species: W. gracilis

Binomial name
- Wikstroemia gracilis Hemsl.

Synonyms
- Daphne rehderi Halda

Species of shrub

Wikstroemia gracilis is a shrub, of the family Thymelaeaceae. It is native to China, specifically Hubei and Sichuan.

== Description ==
The shrub grows up to 1.0 m tall. Its branches are very slender. It is often found in forest and shaded places on slopes at altitudes of 1100 m.
