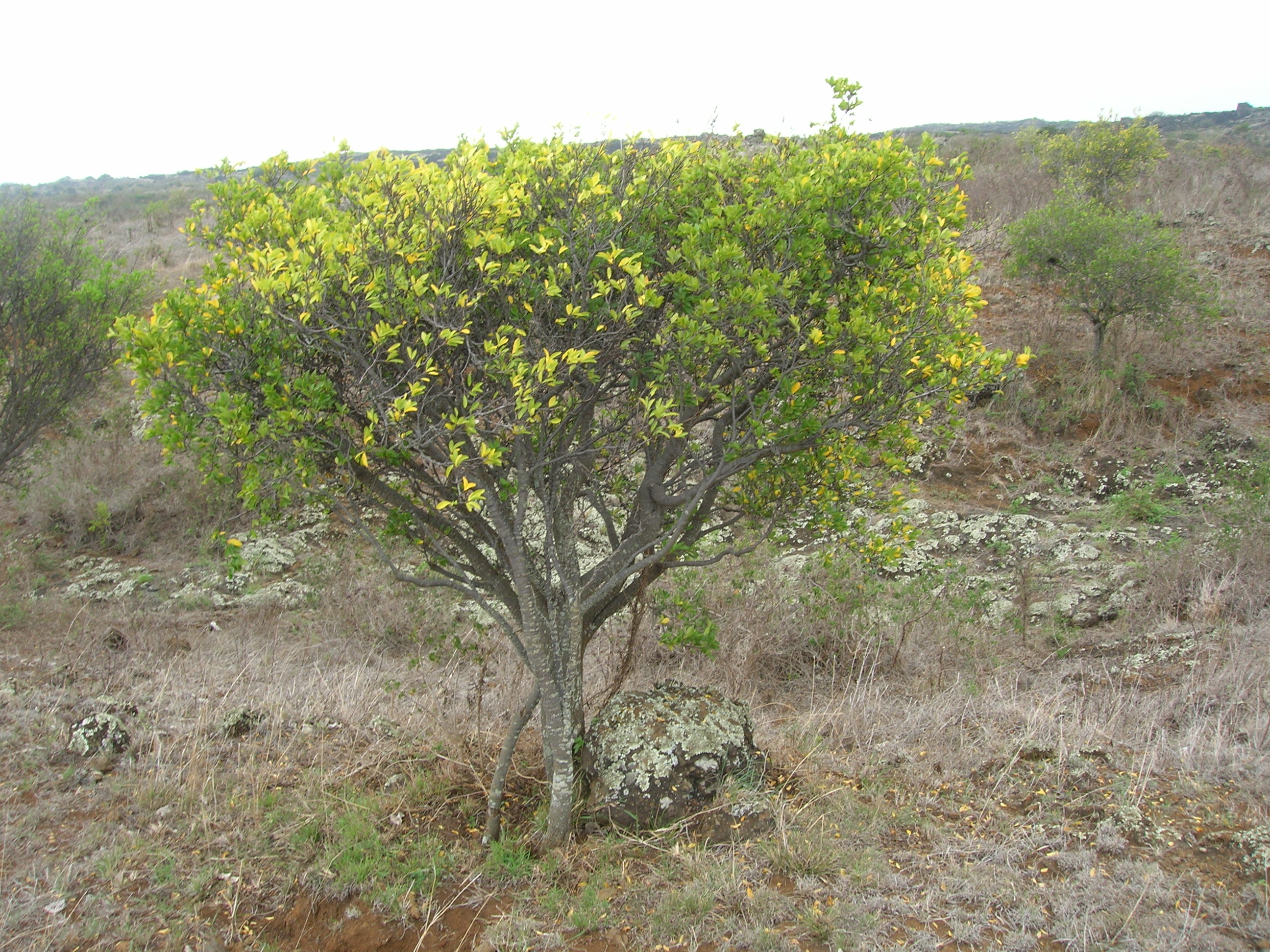
- ʻĀkia (Wikstroemia monticola)

Scientific classification
- Kingdom: Plantae
- Clade: Tracheophytes
- Clade: Angiosperms
- Clade: Eudicots
- Clade: Rosids
- Order: Malvales
- Family: Thymelaeaceae
- Subfamily: Thymelaeoideae
- Genus: Wikstroemia; Endl. (1833), nom. cons.

Species
- 93; see text

Synonyms
- Capura L. (1771); Diplomorpha Meisn. (1841)

= Wikstroemia =

Genus of shrubs

Wikstroemia is a genus of 93 species of flowering shrubs and small trees in the mezereon family, Thymelaeaceae. Hawaiian species are known by the common name ‘ākia.

== Medicinal uses ==
Wikstroemia indica (Chinese: 了哥王; pinyin: liǎo gē wáng) is one of the 50 fundamental herbs used in traditional Chinese medicine.

== Paper making ==
The bark fibres of several species of Wikstroemia are used to make paper.

== Species ==
93 species are accepted.

- Wikstroemia albiflora Yatabe
- Wikstroemia alternifolia Batalin
- Wikstroemia androsaemifolia Decne.
- Wikstroemia angustifolia Hemsl.
- Wikstroemia anhuiensis D.C.Zhang & X.P.Zhang
- Wikstroemia australis Endl. – Norfolk Island
- Wikstroemia baimashanensis S.C.Huang
- Wikstroemia bicornuta Hillebr. – alpine false ohelo (Lānaʻi and Maui, Hawaii)
- Wikstroemia bokorensis E.Oguri & Tagane
- Wikstroemia bolavenensis Tagane & Soulad.
- Wikstroemia brachyantha Merr.
- Wikstroemia canescens Meisn.
- Wikstroemia capitata Rehder
- Wikstroemia capitatoracemosa S.C.Huang
- Wikstroemia chamaedaphne (Bunge) Meisn.
- Wikstroemia chui Merr.
- Wikstroemia cochinchinensis H.H.Pham
- Wikstroemia cochlearifolia S.C.Huang
- Wikstroemia coriacea Sol. ex Seem.
- Wikstroemia delavayi Lecomte
- Wikstroemia dolichantha Diels
- Wikstroemia elliptica Merr.
- Wikstroemia fargesii (Lecomte) Domke
- Wikstroemia floribunda Merr.
- Wikstroemia forbesii Skottsb. – Molokai false ohelo (Molokaʻi, Hawaii)
- Wikstroemia fragrans W.B.Liao, Q.Fan & J.R.Chen
- Wikstroemia fuminensis Y.D.Qi & Yin Z.Wang
- Wikstroemia furcata (Hillebr.) Rock – forest false ohelo (Kauaʻi, Hawaii)
- Wikstroemia ganpi (Siebold & Zucc.) Maxim.
- Wikstroemia gaomushanensis (Zi L.Chen, P.Wang & Y.F.Lu) Y.F.Lu & X.F.Jin
- Wikstroemia glabra W.C.Cheng
- Wikstroemia gracilis Hemsl.
- Wikstroemia guanxianensis Yong H.Zhang, H.Sun & Boufford
- Wikstroemia hainanensis Merr.
- Wikstroemia hanalei Wawra – lavafield false ohelo (Kauaʻi, Hawaii)
- Wikstroemia haoi Domke
- Wikstroemia huidongensis C.Y.Chang
- Wikstroemia indica (L.) C.A.Mey. (synonym Wikstroemia linearifolia) – India and southeast Asia to Malesia, Papuasia, Australia, and the Pacific Islands
- Wikstroemia jiulongensis Yong H.Zhang, H.Sun & Boufford
- Wikstroemia johnplewsii W.L.Wagner & Lorence - Marquesas Islands
- Wikstroemia lamatsoensis Hamaya
- Wikstroemia lanceolata Merr.
- Wikstroemia leptophylla W.W.Sm.
- Wikstroemia liangii Merr. & Chun
- Wikstroemia lichiangensis W.W.Sm.
- Wikstroemia ligustrina Rehder
- Wikstroemia linoides Hemsl.
- Wikstroemia longifolia Lecomte
- Wikstroemia longipaniculata S.C.Huang
- Wikstroemia lungtzeensis S.C.Huang
- Wikstroemia meyeniana Warb.
- Wikstroemia micrantha Hemsl.
- Wikstroemia monnula Hance
- Wikstroemia mononectaria Hayata
- Wikstroemia monticola Skottsb. – ʻĀkia, montane false ohelo (Maui)
- Wikstroemia nutans Champ. ex Benth.
- Wikstroemia oahuensis (A.Gray) Rock – Oʻahu false ohelo (Kauaʻi, Oʻahu, Molokaʻi, Lānaʻi, and Maui in Hawaii)
  - Wikstroemia oahuensis var. oahuensis – Oʻahu false ohelo
  - Wikstroemia oahuensis var. palustris – Oʻahu false ohelo
- Wikstroemia × ohsumiensis Hatus.
- Wikstroemia ovata C.A.Mey.
- Wikstroemia pachyrachis S.L.Tsai
- Wikstroemia pampaninii Rehder
- Wikstroemia pauciflora Franch. & Sav.
- Wikstroemia paxiana H.J.P.Winkl.
- Wikstroemia phillyreifolia A.Gray – Hawaiʻi false ohelo (Island of Hawaiʻi)
- Wikstroemia phymatoglossa Koidz.
- Wikstroemia pilosa W.C.Cheng
- Wikstroemia poilanei Leandri
- Wikstroemia polyantha Merr.
- Wikstroemia pseudoretusa Koidz.
- Wikstroemia pulcherrima Skottsb. – Kohala false ohelo (Island of Hawaiʻi)
- Wikstroemia raiateensis J.W.Moore
- Wikstroemia reginaldi-farreri (Halda) Yin Z.Wang & M.G.Gilbert
- Wikstroemia retusa A.Gray
- Wikstroemia ridleyi Gamble
- Wikstroemia rotundifolia (L.f.) C.A.Mey.
- Wikstroemia salicina (H.Lév.) H.Lév. & Blin.
- Wikstroemia sandwicensis Meisn. – variableleaf false ohelo (Island of Hawaiʻi)
- Wikstroemia scytophylla Diels
- Wikstroemia sikokiana Franch. & Sav.
- Wikstroemia sinoparviflora Yin Z.Wang & M.G.Gilbert
- †Wikstroemia skottsbergiana Sparre – Skottsberg's false ohelo (Kauaʻi, Hawaii)
- Wikstroemia stenophylla E.Pritz.
- Wikstroemia subcyclolepidota L.P.Liu & Y.S.Lian
- Wikstroemia subspicata (Meisn.) Meisn.
- Wikstroemia taiwanensis C.E.Chang
- Wikstroemia techinensis S.C.Huang
- Wikstroemia tenuiramis Miq.
- Wikstroemia trichotoma (Thunb.) Makino
- Wikstroemia uva-ursi A.Gray – hillside false ohelo (Kauaʻi, Oʻahu, Molokaʻi, and Maui in Hawaii)
  - Wikstroemia uva-ursi var. kauaiensis – false ohelo
  - Wikstroemia uva-ursi var. uva-ursi – hillside false ohelo
- Wikstroemia vaccinium (H.Lév.) Rehder
- Wikstroemia venosa Merr. & L.M.Perry
- Wikstroemia villosa Hillebr. – hairy false ohelo (Maui, Hawaii)
- Wikstroemia yakushimensis (Makino) Nakai ex Masam.
- Wikstroemia zhejiangensis Y.F.Lu, Z.H.Chen & X.F.Jin

=== Formerly placed here ===
- Gordonia fruticosa (Schrad.) H.Keng (as Wikstroemia fruticosa Schrad.)
- Rhamnoneuron balansae (Maury) Gilg (as Wikstroemia balansae Maury)

Media related to Wikstroemia at Wikimedia Commons
