= Wikstroemia retusa =

Scientific classification
- Kingdom: Plantae
- Clade: Tracheophytes
- Clade: Angiosperms
- Clade: Eudicots
- Clade: Rosids
- Order: Malvales
- Family: Thymelaeaceae
- Genus: Wikstroemia
- Species: W. retusa

Binomial name
- Wikstroemia retusa A.Gray

Synonyms
- Daphne grayana Halda Wikstroemia obovata Hemsl.

Species of shrub

Wikstroemia retusa (Ao ganpi) is a shrub native to Japan, Taiwan and the Philippines, used for making paper since the 8th century.
