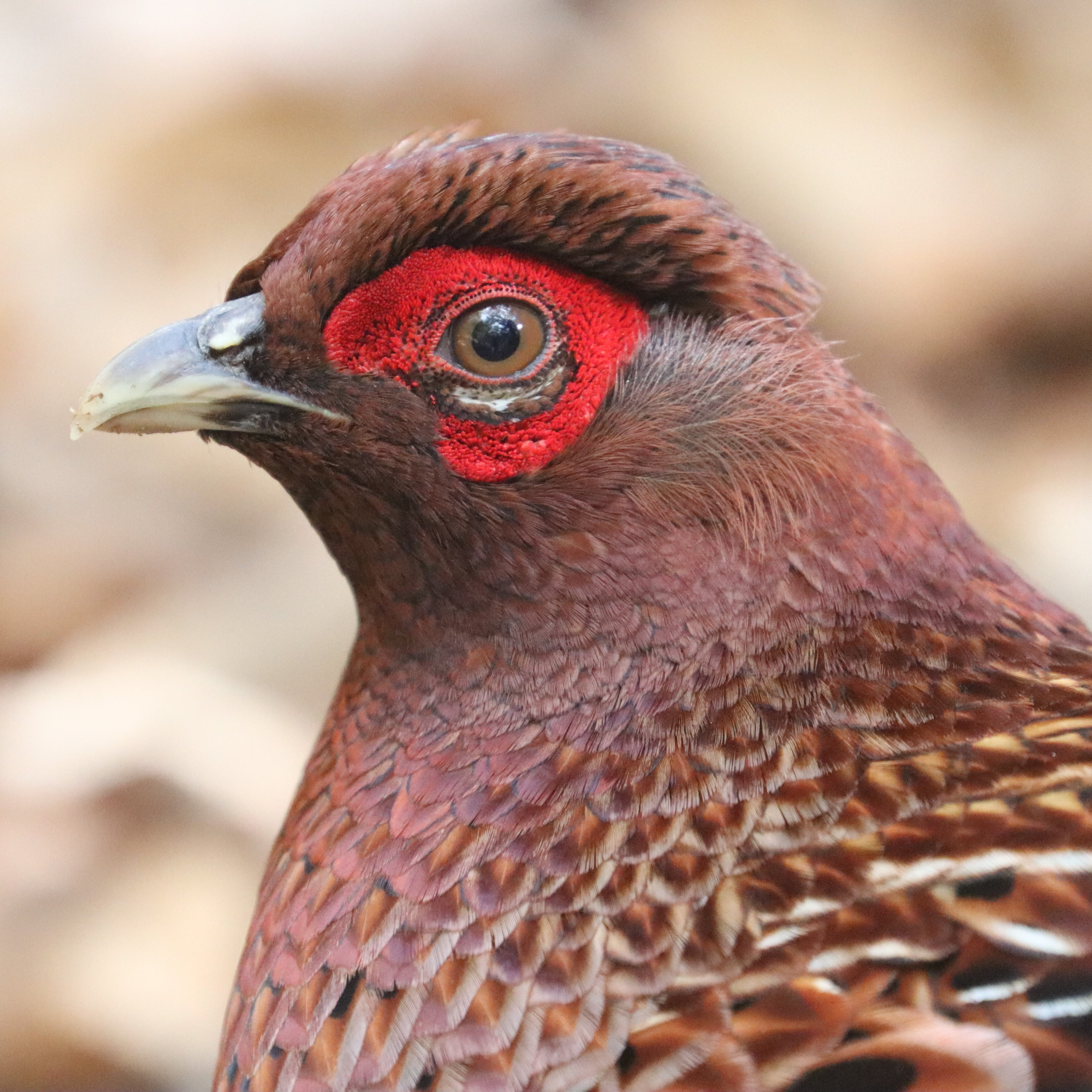
- Male
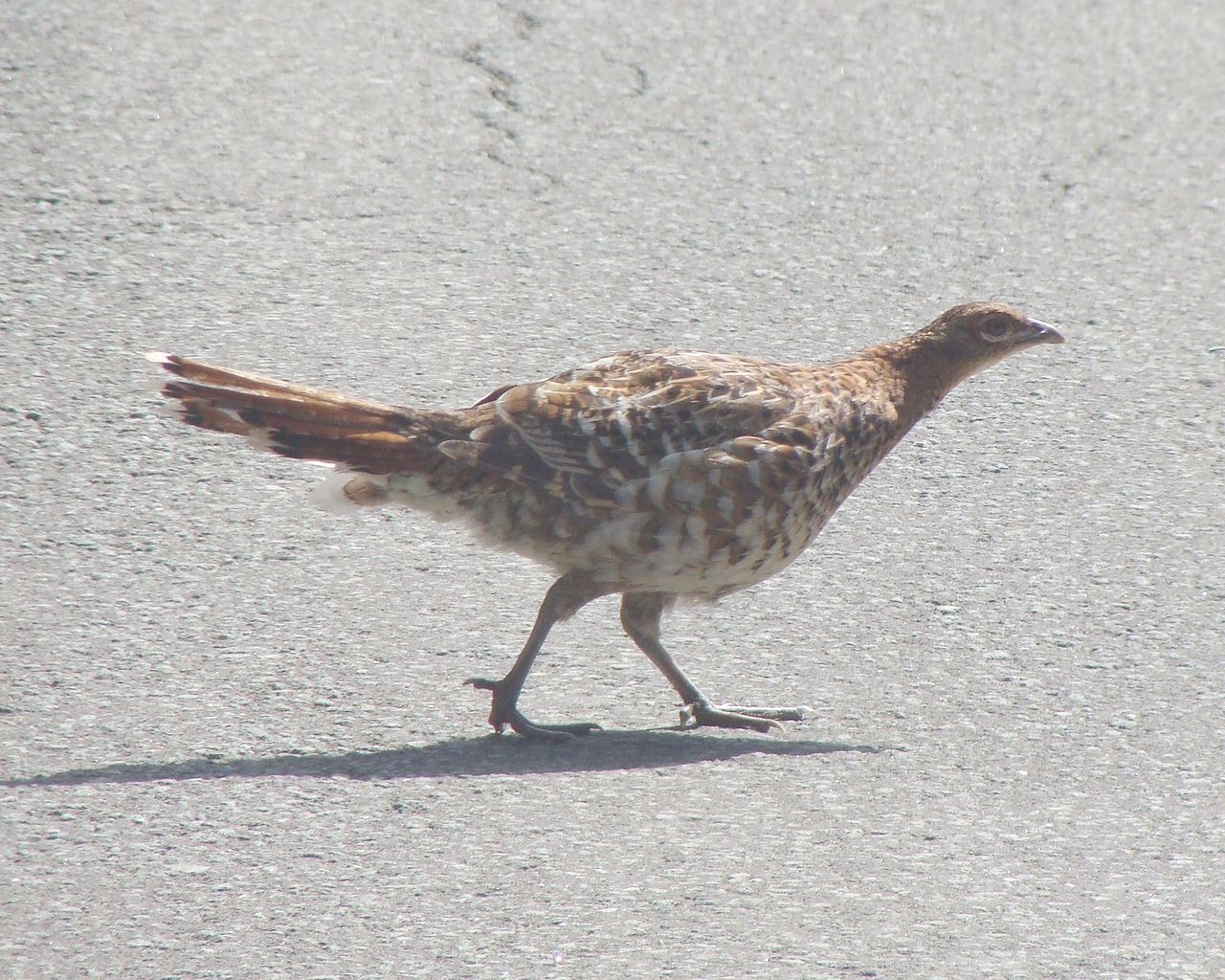
- Female

Conservation status
- Least Concern (IUCN 3.1)

Scientific classification
- Kingdom: Animalia
- Phylum: Chordata
- Class: Aves
- Order: Galliformes
- Family: Phasianidae
- Genus: Syrmaticus
- Species: S. soemmerringii

Binomial name
- Syrmaticus soemmerringii (Temminck, 1830)

= Copper pheasant =

Species of bird

The copper pheasant (Syrmaticus soemmerringii), also known as Soemmerring's pheasant or yamadori (ヤマドリ), is a pheasant endemic to the Japanese archipelago. The scientific name commemorates the German scientist Samuel Thomas von Sömmerring. It is the official bird of multiple Japanese prefectures, cities, and towns. It was commonly hunted for sport throughout the 20th century.

Its population has been in consistent decline since the 1970s due to factors including habitat destruction and predation, but the most widely cited cause is overhunting.

== Taxonomy ==
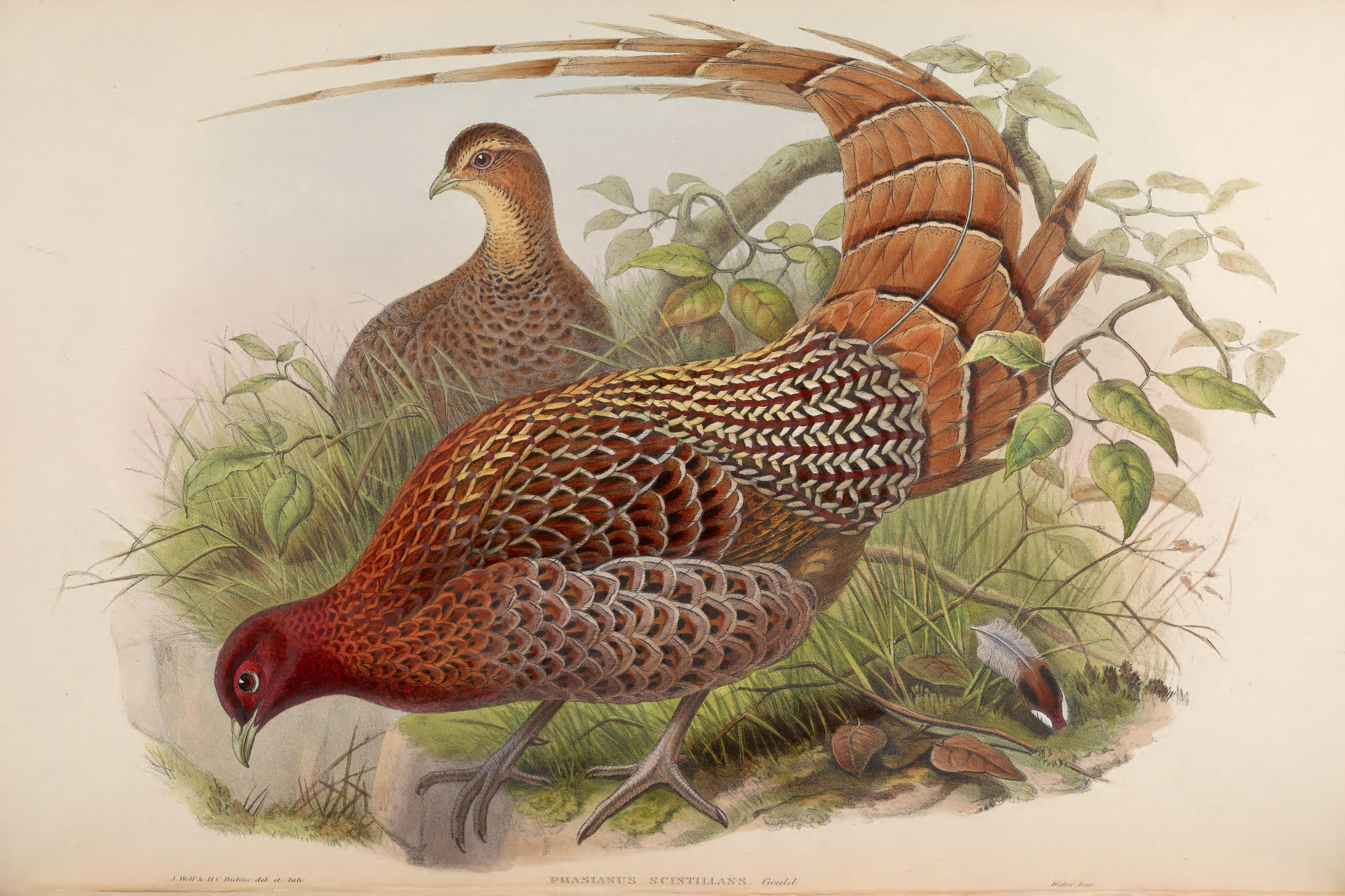
Illustration from John Gould's Birds of Asia

The copper pheasant was described in 1830 by Coenraad Temmerick as Phasianus soemmerringii. It was named for the German scientist Samuel Thomas von Sömmerring, while the subspecies S. s. ijimae is named for Japanese zoologist Isao Ijima. It was reclassified into the Syrmaticus genus in 1914 by William Beebe, despite the differences between the males, because he saw a high number of similarities between females of the genus. However, based on the reports of interbreeding between the copper pheasant and the green pheasant (Phasianus versicolor) in Nobusuke Takatsukasa's 1943 pamphlet, Studies of the Galli of Nippon, the Ornithological Society of Japan moved the bird back into the Phasianus genus. In the same book, Takatsukasa also split the copper pheasant into two species and eliminated all subspecies. Those, as well as other taxonomic changes he proposed, were termed by a United States Fish and Wildlife Service report as "not in accordance with sound systematic practice". The copper pheasant is sometimes still referred to as Phasianus soemmerringii in Japanese literature.

There are five recognized subspecies of copper pheasant:

- Soermmering's copper pheasant (S. s. soemmerringii) (Temminck, 1830) is found the northern and central Kyushu. The nominate subspecies, it is dark reddish in colour with an amber sheen to the rump and tips of the upper-tail coverts.
- Ijima copper pheasant (S. s. ijimae) (Dresser, 1902), also known as the koshijiro-yamadori (コシジロヤマドリ) (literally white-waisted yamadori), is found in southern to central Kyushu. It is similar in appearance to soemmeringii, but the male has a white rump.
- Scintillating copper pheasant (S. s. scintillans) (Gould, 1866), also known as the shining copper pheasant or Honda copper pheasant is found in northern Honshu, from the Kansai region to Aomori prefecture. It is the palest subspecies, with broad white fringes on its belly and flanks.
- Shikoku copper pheasant (S. s. intermedius) (Kuroda, 1919) is found in Shikoku and the Chūgoku regions. Like scintillans, it has white fringes on its belly and flanks, but is darker.
- Pacific copper pheasant (S. s. subrufus) (Kuroda, 1919) is found in the Ehime, and Kōchi, and Yamaguchi prefectures and the Bōsō, Izu, and Kii peninsula. It has golden fringes on its rump and upper-tail coverts.

Both S. s. ijimae and S. s. scintillans were initially described as distinct species.

Pleistocene-era Syrmaticus fossils in Japan have been classified as S. soemmerringii, but this identification is disputed.

== Description ==
It is a large pheasant with a rich coppery chestnut plumage, yellowish bill, brown iris, and red facial skin. The female is a brown bird with greyish brown upperparts and buff barred dark brown below. The male has short spurs on its grey legs, while the female has none. Males are between 87.5 centimetres (34.4 in) and 136 centimetres (54 in) long, including the tail, while the female is between 51 centimetres (20 in) and 54 centimetres (21 in) (subspecies scintillating copper pheasant, scintillans). Juveniles have similar plumage to the females. The plumage of the chicks is, overall, chestnut, with some darker patches of brown on the back of the neck and cream-coloured feathers on the face. Darker stripes of cream and dark brown run along their face and neck.

== Distribution and habitat ==
The copper pheasant is distributed in and endemic to the hill and mountain forests of the Honshū, Kyūshū, and Shikoku islands at elevations of up to 1,800 metres (1.1 mi). It typically confines itself to deciduous forest floors with extensive vegetation. However, members of the species also lives in conifer forests. They often nest on the edges of grasslands. It naturally occurs only south of the Blakiston's Line, and this species' distribution was originally cited as evidence for the line's existence.

Copper pheasant populations have been established on Hokkaido and Sado Island.

== Behavior and ecology ==
The bird is not heavily vocal, only occasionally making a "kuk-kuk"-like call when breeding or threatened. These pheasants are known to sunbathe, especially when living in grasslands. They roost in trees, and are a non-migratory bird.

=== Breeding ===
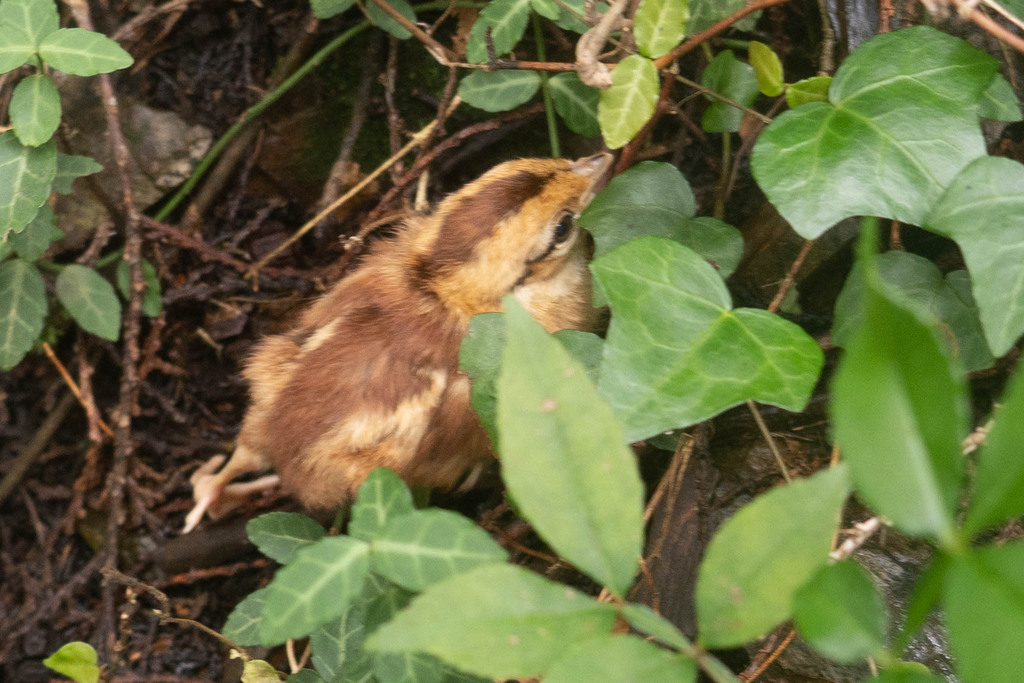
Juvenile Syrmaticus soemmerringii ssp. subrufus

The copper pheasant's mating season occurs between March and July, with the exact month depending local climate. During this time, males perform their wing-whirring display and fight other males in an attempt to secure a mate. It is unknown if the species is monogamous. Male copper pheasants exhibit aggressive behaviour in captivity, sometimes killing their mates. It is usual for this species to be bred in captivity by means of artificial insemination.

Copper pheasants typically nest on the ground, but have also been recorded nesting in trees. They often build their nests in hollows sheltered by fallen trees. Captive birds have a clutch of ten to twenty eggs, while wild birds have a clutch of seven to thirteen eggs. The cream-coloured or tan eggs take twenty five days to hatch, and the chicks are able to walk within hours of hatching. After all the chicks have hatched, they abandon the nest and stay at their mother's side until adulthood. Occasionally, the male pheasant is seen near his offspring and mate, but young are raised primarily by their mother. When threatened, she will either attack potential predators or attempt to distract them by feigning injury herself. Young birds reach maturity in less than a year.

=== Food and feeding ===
Their diet consists mainly of insects, insect larvae, worms, crabs, berries, and acorns, especially those from the Castanopsis, Machilus, Cleyera, and Castanea trees. Adults eat a substantial amount of leaf and fern matter, while the young mostly consume insects.

=== Threats ===
The copper pheasant serves as an important source of prey to Japanese populations of the golden eagle and Hodgson's hawk eagle. It is susceptible to infection by the heterakis gallinarum parasite.

== Relationship to humans ==
=== In Japan ===
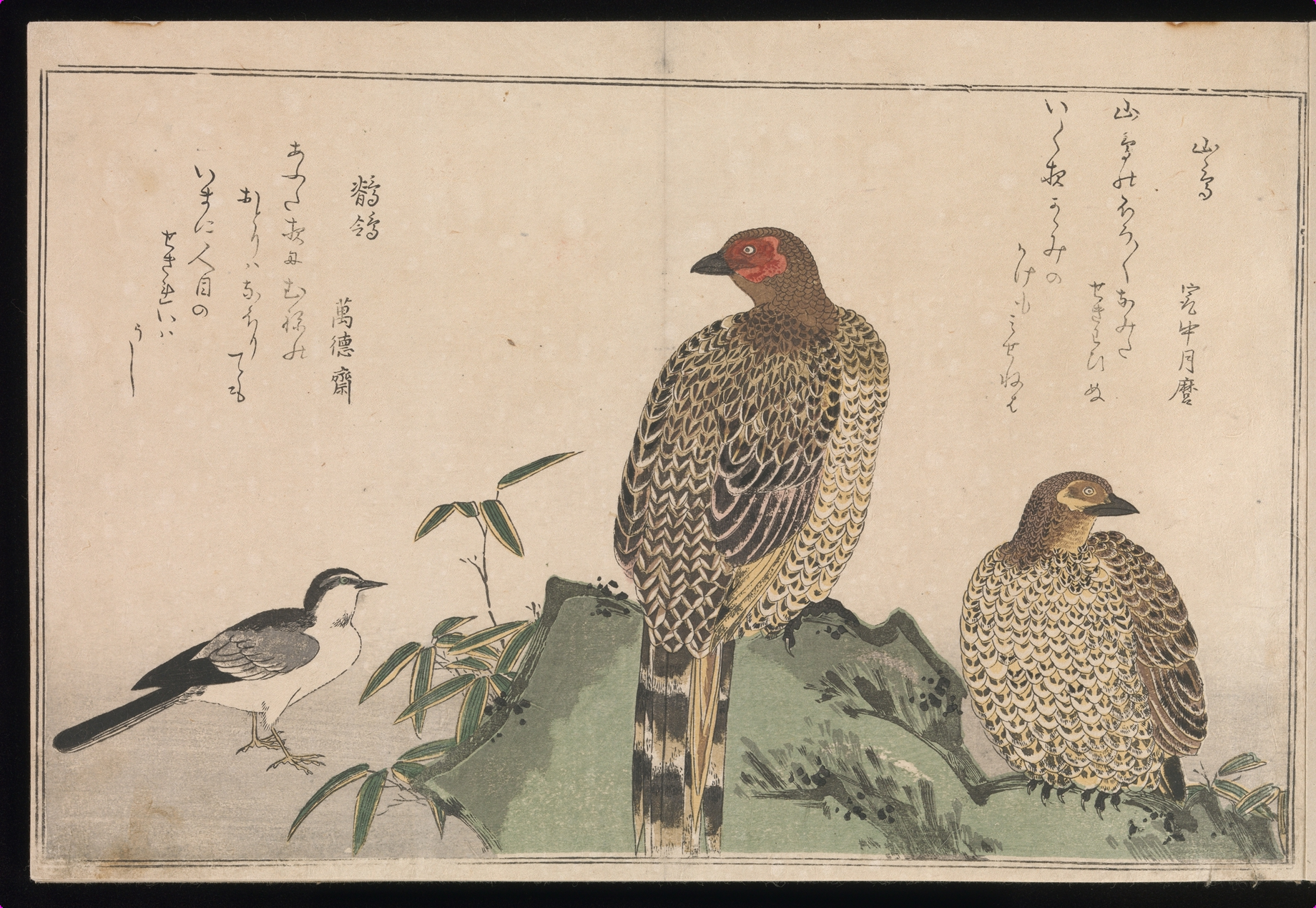
1791 woodblock of a copper pheasant by Kitagawa Utamaro.

The copper pheasant can take the role of a yōkai in Japanese folklore. Tying the pheasant's tail feather's to an arrow grants the arrow the ability to harm malignant spirits in some stories.

The copper pheasant is used in an early 8th century poem by Kakinomoto no Hitomaro, where it is used a metaphor for "the separation of lovers".

葦引の山鳥の尾のしだり尾の
ながながし夜をひとりかも寝む
ashihiki no yamadori no o no shidari o no naganaga shi yo o hitori kamo nemu
Am I to sleep alone this long night, long like a drooping tail, tail feathers of copper pheasants resting mountains apart?
(Kakinomoto no Hitomaro)

Several screens, dating to the eighth century and incorporating copper pheasant feathers, are kept in the Shōsō-in temple. The screens were mistakenly assumed to be Chinese, but are, in reality, of Japanese origin. Unidentified bones of either copper pheasants or chickens have been found at Japanese archaeological sites from the Kofun period.

The copper pheasant is a popular game animal in Japan. They are hunted both as a source of food and a source of entertainment.

It is the official bird of the Gunma and Akita prefectures. The Ijima subspecies is the official bird of the Miyazaki prefecture, as well as a natural monument in the town of Asagiri, Kumamoto. As of 2024, the copper pheasant is the also the official bird of Japanese cities, towns, and villages of Hachimantai, Higashinaruse, Ichinohe, Ikawa, Iwaizumi, Isehara, Kamiyama, Kanegasaki, Karumai, Kitaaiki, Kunohe, Kuzumaki, Mihara, Mogami, Ōkura, Okutama, Shiiba, Sumita, Takayama, Tanohata, Tōno, Yasuoka, Yamakita, and Yuzawa.

It has been depicted on stamps from Japan and Laos.

=== Outside Japan ===
Outside of Japan, the copper pheasant is infrequently kept as a pet or display animal.

The Importation of Plumage (No. 1) Order 1922 (SR&O 1922/275) added an addendum to the Importation of Plumage (Prohibition) Act 1921 (11 & 12 Geo. 5. c. 16) which halted the importation of copper pheasant feathers into the UK. They were removed from the list after a year by the Importation of Plumage (No. 2) Order 1923 (SR&O 1923/1496).

From 1907 to 1914, there was a series unsuccessful attempts made by the Hawaii Board of Agriculture and Forestry to establish copper pheasants colonies on the Hawaiian islands. Another attempt to introduce the birds to the United States was made around 1885 by an American diplomat, when he released three pairs of birds into Puget Sound. It was made illegal in the U.S. states of Nebraska and Oregon to hunt birds he had introduced, but a copper pheasant population was never established.

== Status ==
As of 2025, the copper pheasant was listed as "Least Concern" on the IUCN Red List of Threatened Species, with an estimated population of 50,000 – 300,000 mature individuals. Prior to this, the species had been listed as Near Threatened since 2004. The ijimae subspecies is protected in Japan, with both S. s. soemmeringii and S. s. ijimae being listed as "Near Threatened" on the Japanese Red List.

In 1995, an IUCN report called for the continued monitoring of the species, citing over-hunting and a lack of knowledge about the species' behaviour as a reason to study and protect them. Threats to the species include non-native predation, overhunting, and habitat destruction. Feral dogs and cats disturb nesting sites, further negatively impacting the species. However, overhunting is widely considered as the greatest threat to the species.

Throughout the twentieth century half a million to 800,000 copper pheasants were killed by hunters every year. In 1976, to prevent further decline of the species, it was made illegal in Japan to hunt female copper pheasants. The number of birds hunted decreased to 100,000 per year by the 1990s. As of 2006, the number of birds killed annually had dropped to 6,000. To allow for hunting, captive-bred copper pheasants are released every year throughout Japan, including in regions such as Hokkaido and Sado Island where they are a non-native species.

== Bibliography ==
- Beebe, Williams (1922). A Monograph of the Pheasants (PDF). Vol. 3. London, England: HF & G Witherby.
- Beolens, Bo; Watkins, Michael; Grayson, Michael (2014). The Eponym Dictionary of Birds. Bloomsbury Publishing. ISBN 978-1-4729-0574-1.
- BirdLife International (2016). "Syrmaticus soemmerringii". The IUCN Red List of Threatened Species (Report). doi:10.2305/IUCN.UK.2016-3.RLTS.T22679340A92811551.en.
- Erickson, Jens; Erickson, Hanne (1988). Collect Birds on Stamps (2 ed.). London and Ringwood: Stanley Gibbons. ISBN 0-85259-182-9.
- Johnsgard, Paul A. (1999). The pheasants of the world: biology and natural history (2nd ed.). Washington, DC: Smithsonian Institution Press. p. 271. ISBN 978-1-56098-839-7.
- Mahood, D.; Benstead, P.; Taylor, J. (2024). "Copper Pheasant (Syrmaticus soemmerringii) - BirdLife species factsheet". datazone.birdlife.org.
- McGowan, Philip J. K.; Garson, Peter J. (1995). Pheasants: status survey and conservation action plan, 1995-1999 (PDF). WPA/BirdLife/SSC Pheasant Specialist Group, International Union for Conservation of Nature and Natural Resources. Gland, Switzerland: IUCN. ISBN 978-2-8317-0299-5.
- Watanabe, Junya; Matsuoka, Hiroshige; Hasegawa, Yoshikazu (2018-08-11). "Pleistocene non-passeriform landbirds from Shiriya, northeast Japan" (PDF). Acta Palaeontologica Polonica. 63 (3): 469–491. doi:10.4202/app.00509.2018. ISSN 0078-8562.
