= Ornithological Society of Japan =

Society of ornithology

- 日本鳥学会
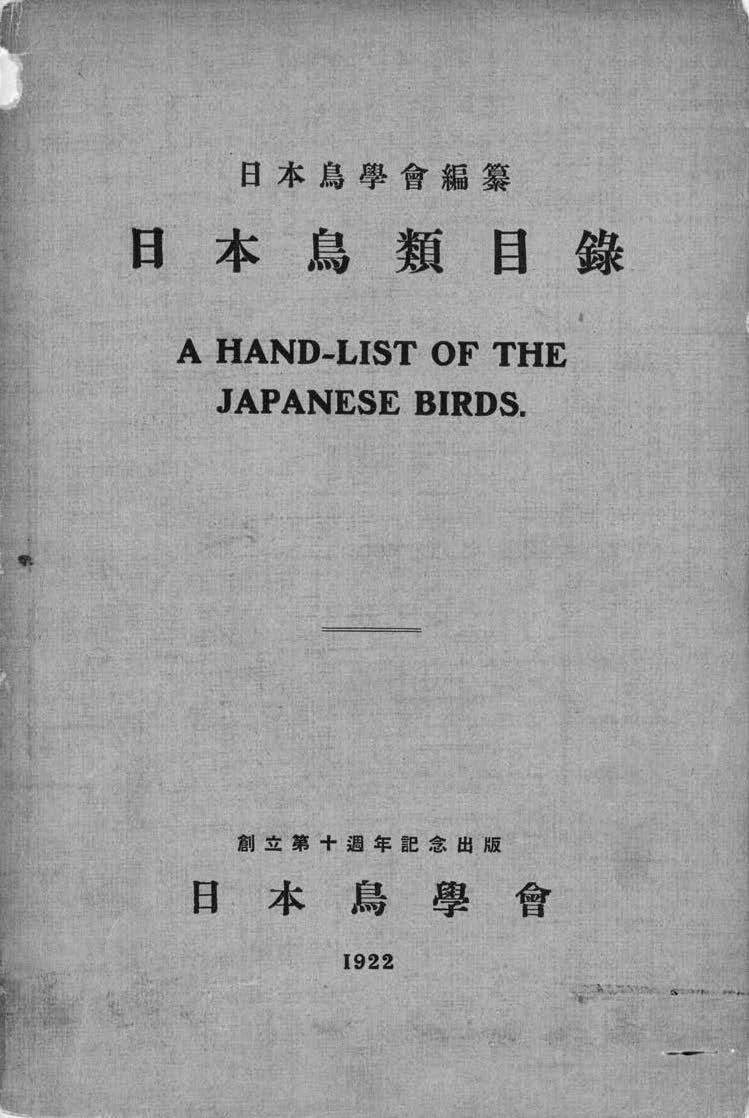
- First edition of the Society's Check-list of Japanese Birds (「日本鳥類目録」)
- Formation: 3 May 1912
- Location: Japan
- Key people: Watanuki Yutaka (President)
- Website: Official website

The Ornithological Society of Japan (日本鳥学会, Nihon Chōgakkai) is a Japanese academic society founded in 1912. It publishes journals and monographs and helps disseminate information about the birds of Japan and ornithology more generally.

== Journals ==
- Tori (鳥) (1915–1986; vols. 1–34)
- Japanese Journal of Ornithology (日本鳥学会誌) (1986–; vols. 35–)
- Ornithological Science (2002–; vols. 1–)

== Presidents ==
The presidents of the Society from its inception have included:

- Iijima Isao (1912–1921)
- Takatsukasa Nobusuke (1922–1946)
- Uchida Seinosuke (1946–1947)
- Kuroda Nagamichi (1947–1963)
- Yamashina Yoshimaro (1963–1970)
- Kuroda Nagahisa (1970–1975)
- Koga Tadamichi (1975–1981)
- Kuroda Nagahisa (1981–1990)

== See also ==
- Yamashina Institute for Ornithology
- Japanese Society for Preservation of Birds
- Wild Bird Society of Japan
- List of birds of Japan
