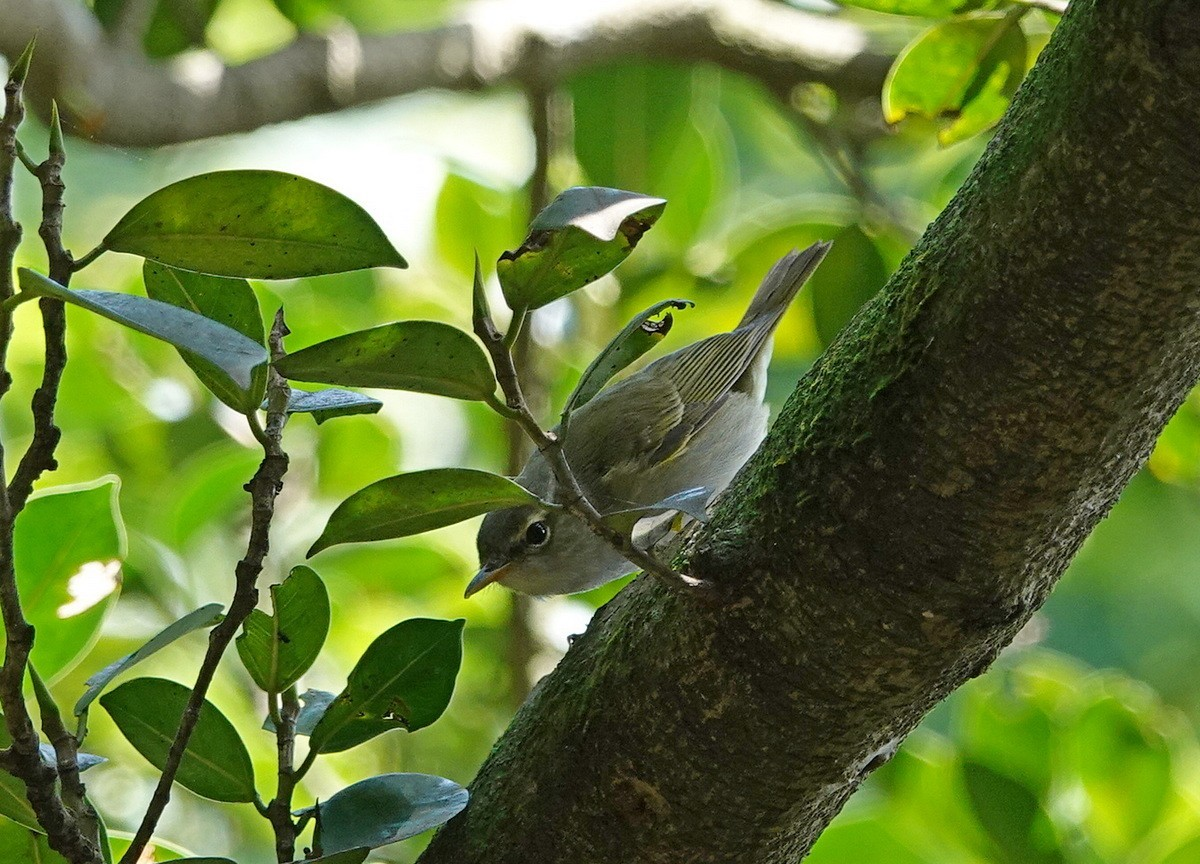
- Warbler in Taiwan (April 2021)

Conservation status
- Vulnerable (IUCN 3.1)

Scientific classification
- Kingdom: Animalia
- Phylum: Chordata
- Class: Aves
- Order: Passeriformes
- Family: Phylloscopidae
- Genus: Phylloscopus
- Species: P. ijimae

Binomial name
- Phylloscopus ijimae (Stejneger, 1892)

Synonyms
- Acanthopneuste ijimae (protonym); Acanthopneuste occipitalis ijimae Phylloscopus coronatus ijimae Phylloscopus tenellipes ijimae

= Ijima's leaf warbler =

Species of bird

Ijima's leaf warbler (Phylloscopus ijimae) (also known as Izu leaf warbler, Ijima's willow warbler or Ijima's warbler) is a species of Old World warbler in the family Phylloscopidae. The species is native to Japan, where it has been designated a Natural Monument under the 1950 Law for the Protection of Cultural Properties, with records also from Taiwan and the Philippines.

== Taxonomy ==
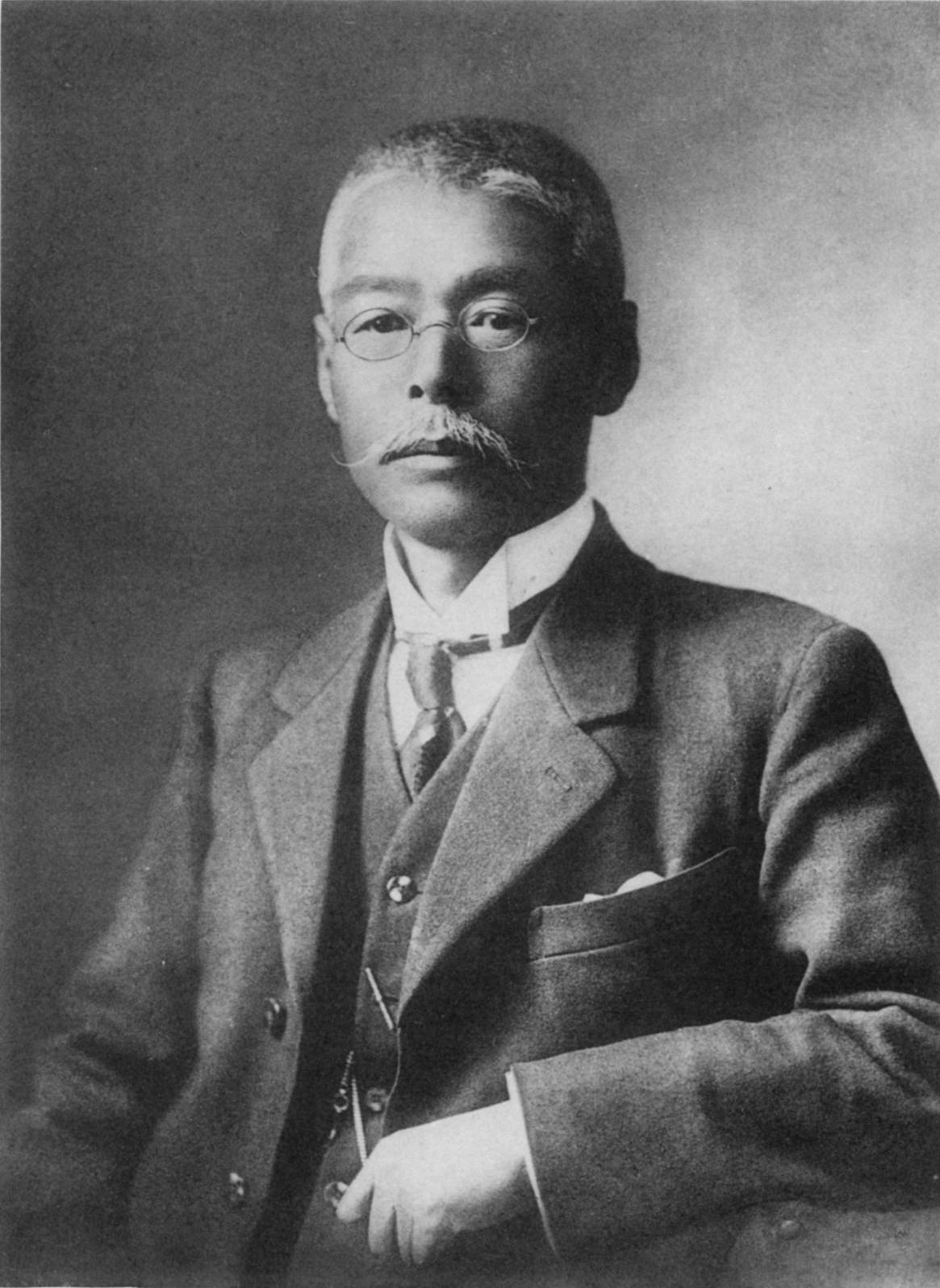
Ijima Isao (1861–1921), whose name the warbler bears

Ijima's leaf warbler is a monotypic species first described by Leonhard Stejneger in 1892, based on three specimens collected in the spring of 1887 by Namie Motokichi on Miyake-jima and Nii-jima, in the Izu Islands of Tokyo. Initially given the scientific name Acanthopneuste ijimae by Stejneger, Momiyama Tokutarō followed suit in a 1923 paper on the birds of Izu Ōshima. In a 1926 paper on a collection of birds from the Ryūkyū Islands, Kuroda Nagamichi treated the warbler instead as a subspecies of the western crowned warbler, as Acanthopneuste occipitalis ijimae, Yamashina Yoshimaro following suit in 1935. In 1938, Claud Ticehurst treated the warbler as a "race" of the eastern crowned warbler (Phylloscopus coronatus), as did Allan Robert Phillips in 1947, based on three specimens from the southern part of Okinawa Island, the combination being Phylloscopus coronatus ijimae. In 1953, citing differences in songs and nesting behaviours, Oliver L. Austin and Kuroda Nagahisa elevated the warbler to specific rank, with the binomial Phylloscopus ijimae, a treatment followed the next year by Charles Vaurie Kenneth Williamson treated the warbler as a subspecies of the pale-legged leaf warbler, under the combination Phylloscopus tenellipes ijimae; however, due to differences in its vocalizations, nesting preferences, and DNA, the warbler has again been elevated to species rank, as Phylloscopus ijimae. The specific name honours Ijima Isao, for his contributions to Japanese ornithology.

== Description ==
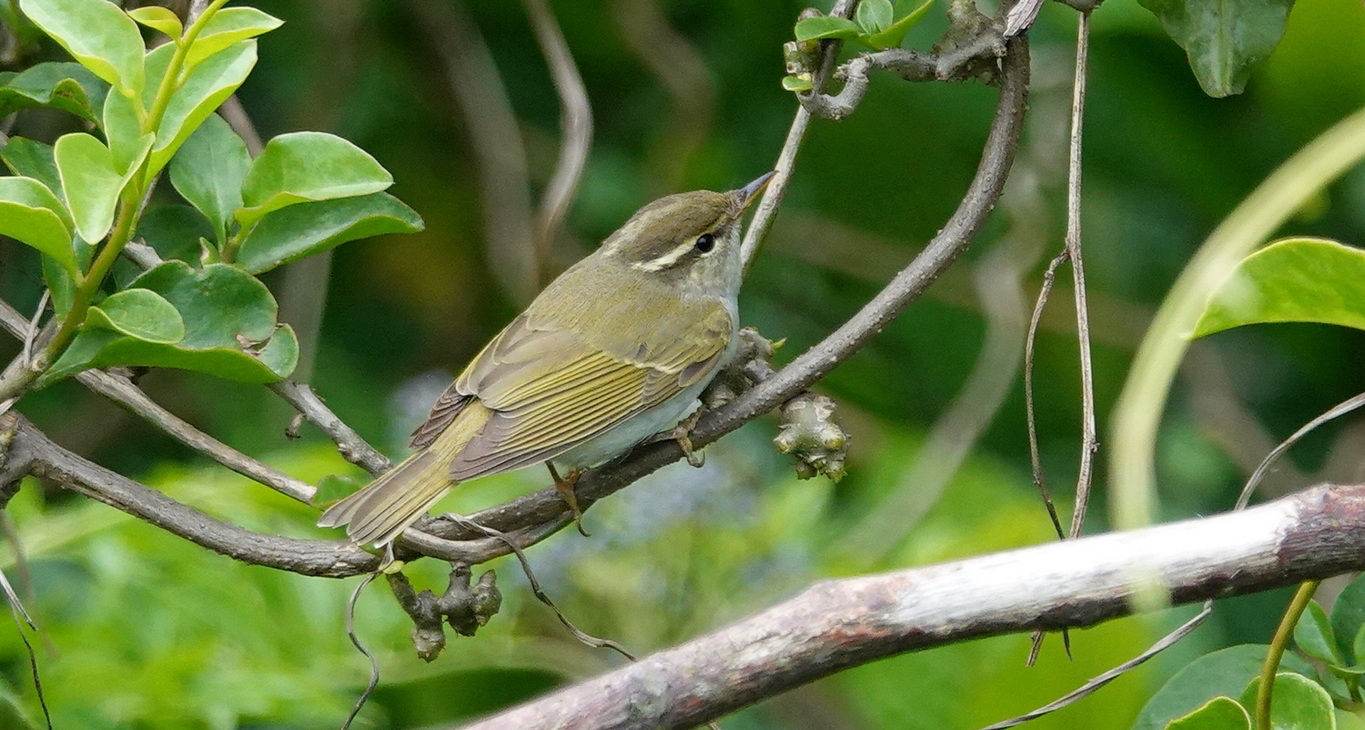
The eastern crowned warbler (Phylloscopus coronatus) may be distinguished by its crown stripe

Ijima's leaf warbler is a small passerine with a total length of 11.5 cm (4.5 in) and weight of around 10 g (0.35 oz). The crown and nape are a greenish-grey, upperparts a bright olive green, flanks greyish, and underparts white. It has a long white or buffish-white supercilium, blackish eyestripe, and dark brown iris. The beak is relatively long and "broad-based", the upper mandible dark brown, the lower yellowish, and the legs and feet a pinkish brown.

The warbler is similar in appearance to the eastern crowned warbler (Phylloscopus coronatus), from which it may be distinguished visually by the absence of a central stripe on its crown and by its paler yellow undertail coverts. Its song and calls, which include "swss, swss, swss", "swee-swee-swee-swee-swee", "shwee-it, shweet, shweet, shweet", and a soft "se-chui, se-chui, se-chui" and "phi-phi-phi", also differ from those of the eastern crowned warbler.

== Distribution and habitat ==
Ijima's leaf warbler breeds in the summer in the Izu Islands, from Izu Ōshima to Aogashima, and also on Nakanoshima in the Tokara Islands. In the spring and autumn, there are records of its presence from Honshū (Shizuoka, Aichi, and Wakayama prefectures), Mizunoko-jima, Tanegashima, Yakushima, and Okinawa Island and the Yaeyama Islands in the Ryūkyūs. Its wintering grounds are poorly understood; a small number may overwinter in the Izu Islands (Miyake-jima and Hachijō-jima) and Ryūkyū Islands, while there are also records from Taiwan and Luzon in the northern Philippines. It inhabits the "lowland deciduous and mixed subtropical evergreen forest" and laurel forest, including the forest edge, stands of alder (Alnus) and bamboo, and shrubland.

== Ecology ==
Insects form the principal component of its diet — when written in kanji (飯島虫喰), the warbler's Japanese name reads as "Ijima's insect-eater" — which also includes seeds. For these it forages, singly or in small groups (sometimes including other species, in particular long-tailed tits (Aegithalos caudatus)), on lower branches, in the forest canopy, and on the ground, and it may also take prey in mid-air.

The breeding season is from April to June or July. Nests are built some 0.5–2 m (1 ft 8 in – 6 ft 7 in) from the ground, on broad-leaved trees and in bamboo (this nesting behaviour differs from that of the eastern crowned warbler, which nests on the ground and in earthen banks). The clutch size ranges from two to four eggs, with three or four the most common.

== Conservation ==
The declining population, thought to total fewer than 10,000 individuals, is threatened by habitat loss and fragmentation. In addition, the availability of prey may be impacted by the use of pesticides. The species was badly affected by the eruption of Miyake-jima in 2000.

With an estimated 3% of the global population, Phylloscopus ijimae (Chinese: 飯島柳鶯) is included on the 2016 Red List of Birds of Taiwan with the status "vulnerable". (The species is also included on the 2016 Red List of China's Vertebrates (with the vernacular name 日本冕柳莺), with the status "near threatened".) In the Philippines, the species is included on the National List of Threatened Fauna, as a migrant bird on Luzon, with the status "vulnerable". On the 2020 Japanese Ministry of the Environment Red List, Phylloscopus ijimae (Japanese: イイジマムシクイ) has the status "vulnerable", as it had done also on the 1998 and 2007 editions.

== See also ==
- List of birds of Japan
- List of Red Lists
