= Orii Hyōjirō =

Japanese specimen collector (1883–1970)

Orii Hyōjirō 折居彪二郎
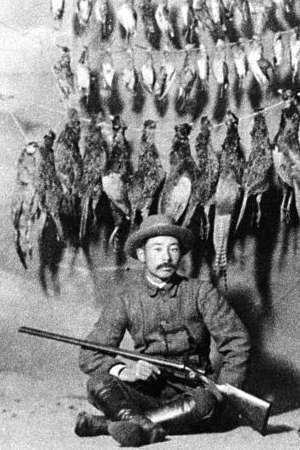
- Orii Hyōjirō in 1913
- Born: 15 July 1883; Niigata Prefecture, Japan
- Died: 27 April 1970 (aged 86)
- Other names: "Orii of the Orient"
- Occupation(s): Hunting and taxidermy
- Known for: Collection of type specimens

Orii Hyōjirō (折居 彪二郎) (15 July 1883 – 27 April 1970) was a Japanese specimen collector of birds and mammals. At least a hundred new species and subspecies were described based on the type specimens he collected, a 2014 review putting the total, among taxa currently recognized, at 14 species and 41 subspecies of mammal, and 6 species and 68 subspecies of bird. The 7 mammal and 10 bird taxa named in honour of "Orii of the Orient" (Japanese: 東洋のオリイ), as he came to be known, include the Ryūkyū shrew (Crocidura orii) and now-extinct Daitō varied tit (Sittiparus varius orii).

== Biography ==
Born in Niigata Prefecture in 1883, Orii moved to Hakodate in 1899; in 1913 he would move again, from Hakodate to a house on the banks of the Bibi River where it meets Lake Utonai (now a Ramsar site), in what was then the village of Tomakomai. His career as a specimen collector took off in 1906, when he provided his services first to Malcolm Playfair Anderson, then to Alan Owston. In 1906/7, Orii collected for Owston on the Korean Peninsula and in Shandong Province, China; this arrangement continued in 1910, when Orii collected specimens in Yunnan Province. In the years between, he travelled and collected in the Kuril Islands, northern China and Manchuria, and Sakhalin. In 1921, he collected for Kuroda Nagamichi in the Ryūkyūs. Between 1925 and 1935, collecting for Yamashina Yoshimaro, his travels took him again to Sakhalin, to the northern Kurils, Korea, the Pacific Islands (including Palau, Pohnpei, and the Marshall Islands), Taiwan, and Manchuria, where he would also collect once again for Kuroda. In 1936, he collected in the southern Ryūkyūs, and in 1944, around Akkeshi and Nemuro in eastern Hokkaidō. The specimens he collected in these years number in the tens of thousands, including some 8,845 items from 556 species in the Yamashina Institute for Ornithology; other specimens are in the Natural History Museum in London, Hokkaido University Faculty of Agriculture Museum, and Tomakomai City Museum. In total, as many as 14 species and 41 subspecies of mammal, and 6 species and 68 subspecies of bird were described from type specimens he provided. Later in life he turned his hand to recording sightings of birds, participating in surveys for the Forestry Agency at Lake Utonai and other lakes and marshes in the vicinity of his home.

== Diaries ==
Orii left a large number of collection diaries — an important resource for ornithologists and mammalogists — which also include lively accounts of his expeditions, such as when, having spotted a rare bird on a list of specimens obtained by the Whitney South Sea Expedition ship at the village office on Pohnpei, he promptly collected and shipped a specimen back to Tokyo, where Takatsukasa Nobusuke and Yamashina Yoshimaro published the long-billed white-eye (Rukia longirostra; protonym: Cynnirorhyncha longirostra) as a new genus and species a few weeks before Ernst Mayr published the same bird as Rhamphozosterops sanfordi. The collection diaries are compiled in a somewhat idiosyncratic fashion, interspersed with English and Chinese, and with names sometimes in hiragana, sometimes katakana; in 2013, they were published in a modern Japanese translation.

== Death ==
Orii died in 1970, at the age of 87 by traditional East Asian age reckoning.

== Taxa named after Orii ==
The seven mammal and ten bird taxa named in honour of Orii Hyōjirō include:

- Ryūkyū shrew (Crocidura orii; protonym: Crocidura dsinezumi orii)
- Sakhalin hare (Lepus timidus orii)
- Ezo flying squirrel (Pteromys volans orii; protonym: Sciuropterus russicus orii)
- Orii's least horseshoe bat (Rhinolophus cornutus orii)
- Palau starling (Aplonis opaca orii)
- Yakushima jay (Garrulus glandarius orii)
- Japanese light-vented bulbul (Pycnonotus sinensis orii)
- †Daitō varied tit (Sittiparus varius orii)
- Taiwan turtle dove (Streptopelia orientalis orii)
- Rota kingfisher (Todiramphus albicilla orii; protonym: Halcyon chloris orii)
- Kuril brown-headed thrush (Turdus chrysolaus orii)
- Iriomote pygmy woodpecker (Yungipicus kizuki orii)

== See also ==
- List of Ramsar sites in Japan
- Species description
- Binomial nomenclature
