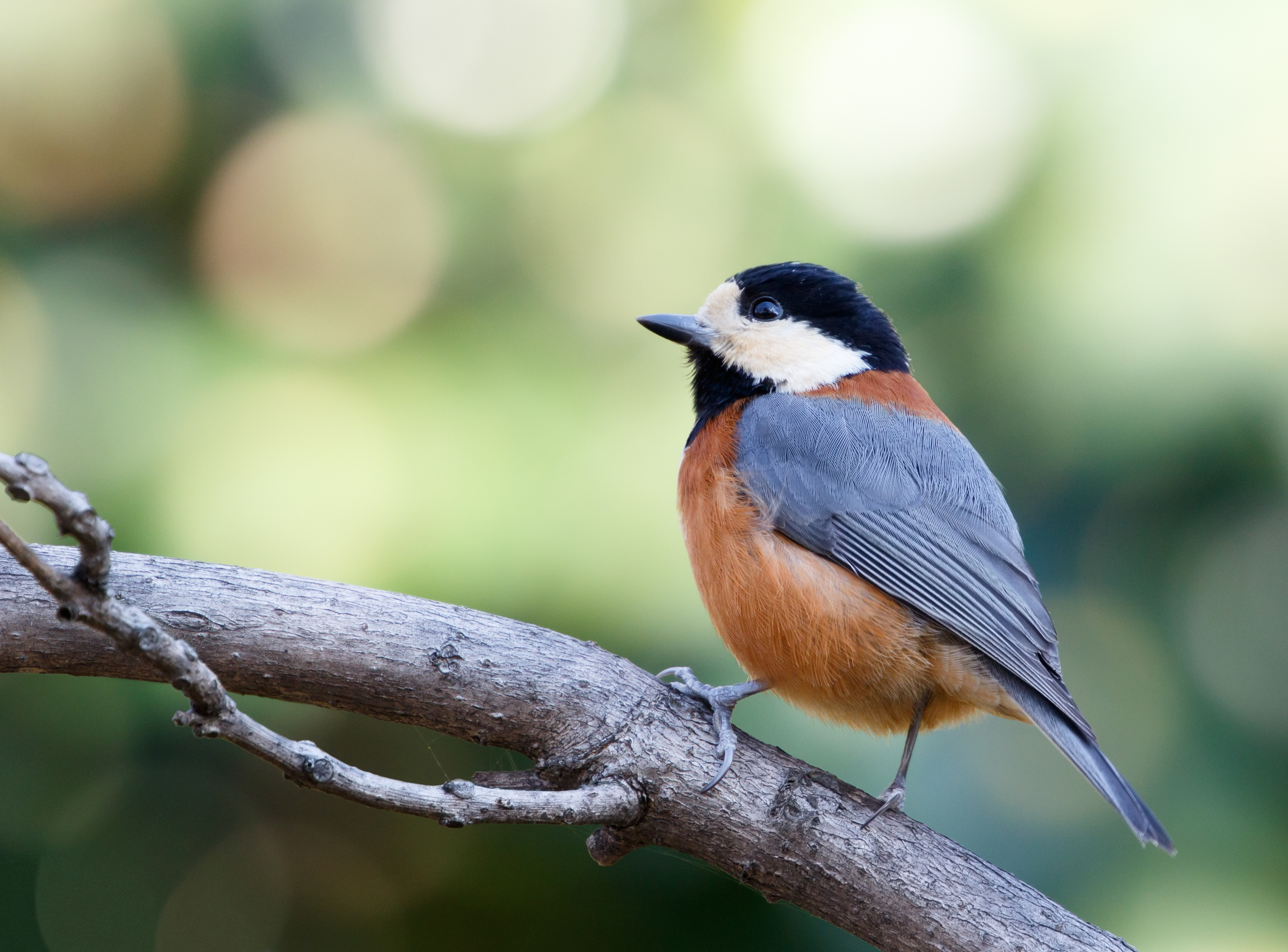

Conservation status
- Least Concern (IUCN 3.1)

Scientific classification
- Kingdom: Animalia
- Phylum: Chordata
- Class: Aves
- Order: Passeriformes
- Family: Paridae
- Genus: Sittiparus
- Species: S. varius

Binomial name
- Sittiparus varius (Temminck & Schlegel, 1847)

Subspecies
- 5 living, 1 recently extinct; see text

Synonyms
- Cyanistes varius; Poecile varius; Parus varius

= Varied tit =

Species of bird

The varied tit (Sittiparus varius) is a perching bird from the tit family, Paridae. It occurs in the eastern Palearctic in Japan, Korea, and locally in northeastern China (southern Liaoning) and extreme southeastern Russia (southern Kurile Islands).

== Taxonomy ==
The varied tit was described by the Dutch zoologist Coenraad Jacob Temminck and the German ornithologist Hermann Schlegel in 1845 and given the binomial name Parus varius. (Note: Fauna Japonica was issued in fascicles (parts). Although the description of the varied tit on pages 71-72 was included in fascicles IV-VIII which were published in 1848, plate 35 was published with fascicle 2 in July 1845.) Until the end of the twentieth century the varied tit was usually placed along with most of the other member of the tit family in the genus Parus. In 2005 the report of a molecular phylogenetic study that examined mitochondrial DNA sequences from members of the tit family, recommended including the varied tit along with around fifteen other species in the resurrected genus Poecile. The authors of a 2013 study that analysed both mitochondrial and nuclear sequences, suggested splitting Poecile and placing the varied tit and its sister taxon, the white-fronted tit in their own genus Sittiparus. The genus had originally been erected by the Belgium politician and naturalist Edmond de Sélys Longchamps in 1884 with the varied tit as the type species. This proposal was adopted by the International Ornithologists' Union.

Owston's tit (Sittiparus owstoni), the Iriomote tit (Sittiparus olivaceus) and the chestnut-bellied tit (Sittiparus castaneoventris) were formerly considered as subspecies of the varied tit, but were promoted to species status following the publication of a phylogenetic study in 2014.

A number of subspecies have been described, of which one has become extinct in the 20th century:

- S. v. varius (Temminck & Schlegel, 1845) - southern Kuriles (Kunashir, Shikotan, Iturup), north-eastern China, central and southern Korea, Japan
- S. v. sunsunpi (Kuroda, 1919) - Tanegashima
- S. v. namiyei (Kuroda, 1918) - Toshima Island, Niijima and Kōzu-shima
- S. v. yakushimensis (Kuroda, 1919) - Yakushima
- S. v. amamii Kuroda, 1922 - Amami Ōshima, Tokunoshima and Okinawa Island
- S. v. orii Kuroda, 1923 Daito varied tit - formerly Daitō Islands (Kitadaitōjima and Minami Daitōjima), extinct c. 1940

== Description ==
The varied tit is 12–14 cm (4.7–5.5 in) long and weighs 16–18 g (0.56–0.63 oz). The wing length is 6.0–7.8 cm (2.4–3.1 in). In the nominate race S. v. varius the crown, the bill, the throat, the upper breast and the nape are black. Forehead, face, and cheeks are white. Back, wings, and tail are bluish grey. Mantle, lower breast, belly and undertail coverts are chestnut coloured. From the crown to the nape runs a thin white central line. The feet are dark grey.

Its habitat consists of open mixed forests, in particular with the Japanese Castanopsis species Castanopsis cuspidata and Japanese larch, coniferous forests with Japanese yews, Cryptomeria (sugi), and pines as well as bamboo forests at mountain slopes and in river valleys.

The varied tit eats a mixed diet consisting of seeds and insects, namely caterpillars.

Its call consists of tiny tones which sounds like tzu....tzu....tzu...

== In culture ==
In Japan varied tits have been used in a kind of show called "omikujihiki" to draw fortune telling-slips (omikuji). Using a small model Shinto shrine the birds will deposit a coin, ring a bell, open the door, remove a fortune telling slip and return with it. They may also use their beaks to open it by cutting a string or tape.
