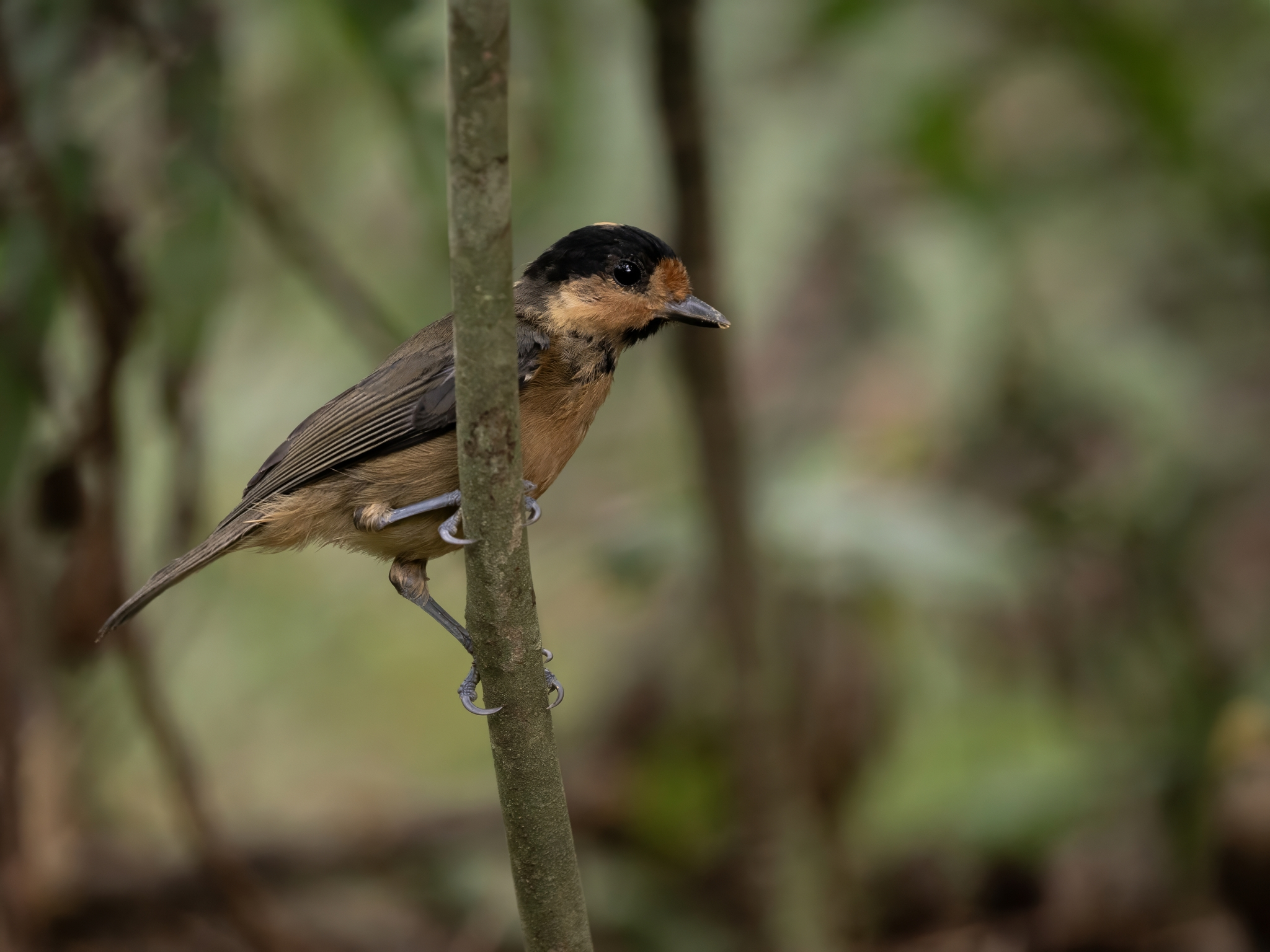
- Adult
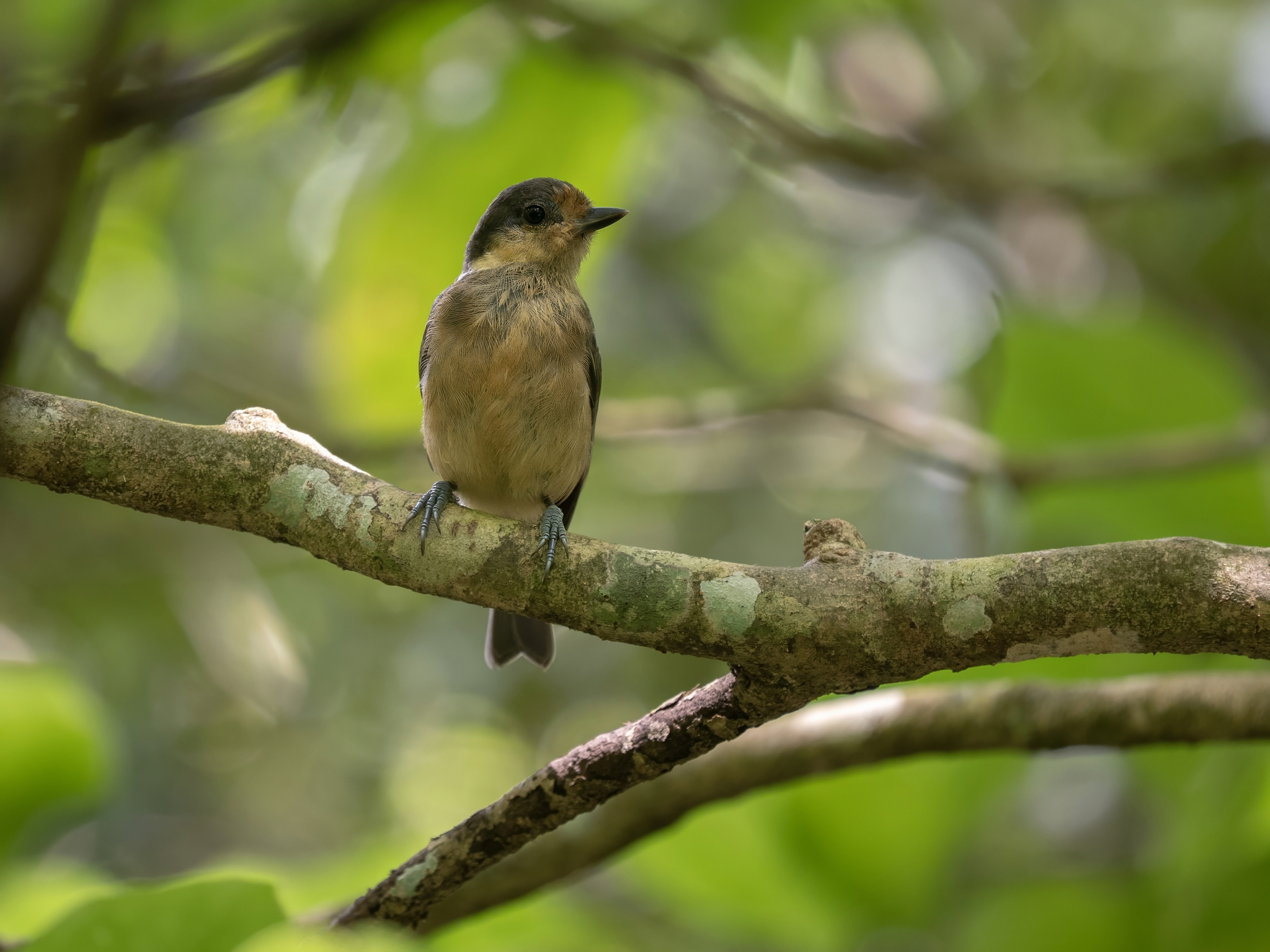
- Juvenile

Conservation status
- Least Concern (IUCN 3.1)

Scientific classification
- Kingdom: Animalia
- Phylum: Chordata
- Class: Aves
- Order: Passeriformes
- Family: Paridae
- Genus: Sittiparus
- Species: S. olivaceus

Binomial name
- Sittiparus olivaceus Kuroda, 1923

Synonyms
- Sittiparus varius olivaceus; Poecile varius olivaceus

= Iriomote tit =

Species of bird

The Iriomote tit (Sittiparus olivaceus) is a small passerine bird in the tit family Paridae. It is endemic to the Yaeyama Islands which lie to the south west of Japan and to the east of Taiwan. Iriomote is the name of the largest island in the group.

The Iriomote tit was first described by the Japanese ornithologist Nagamichi Kuroda in 1923 and given the trinomial name Sittiparus varius olivaceus. It was formerly considered as subspecies of the varied tit but after the publication of a phylogenetic study in 2014 it was promoted to species status.

The species differs from the varied tit in having a washed olive colouring on the back.
