= Isao Ijima =

Japanese zoologist and spongiologist

- 飯島魁
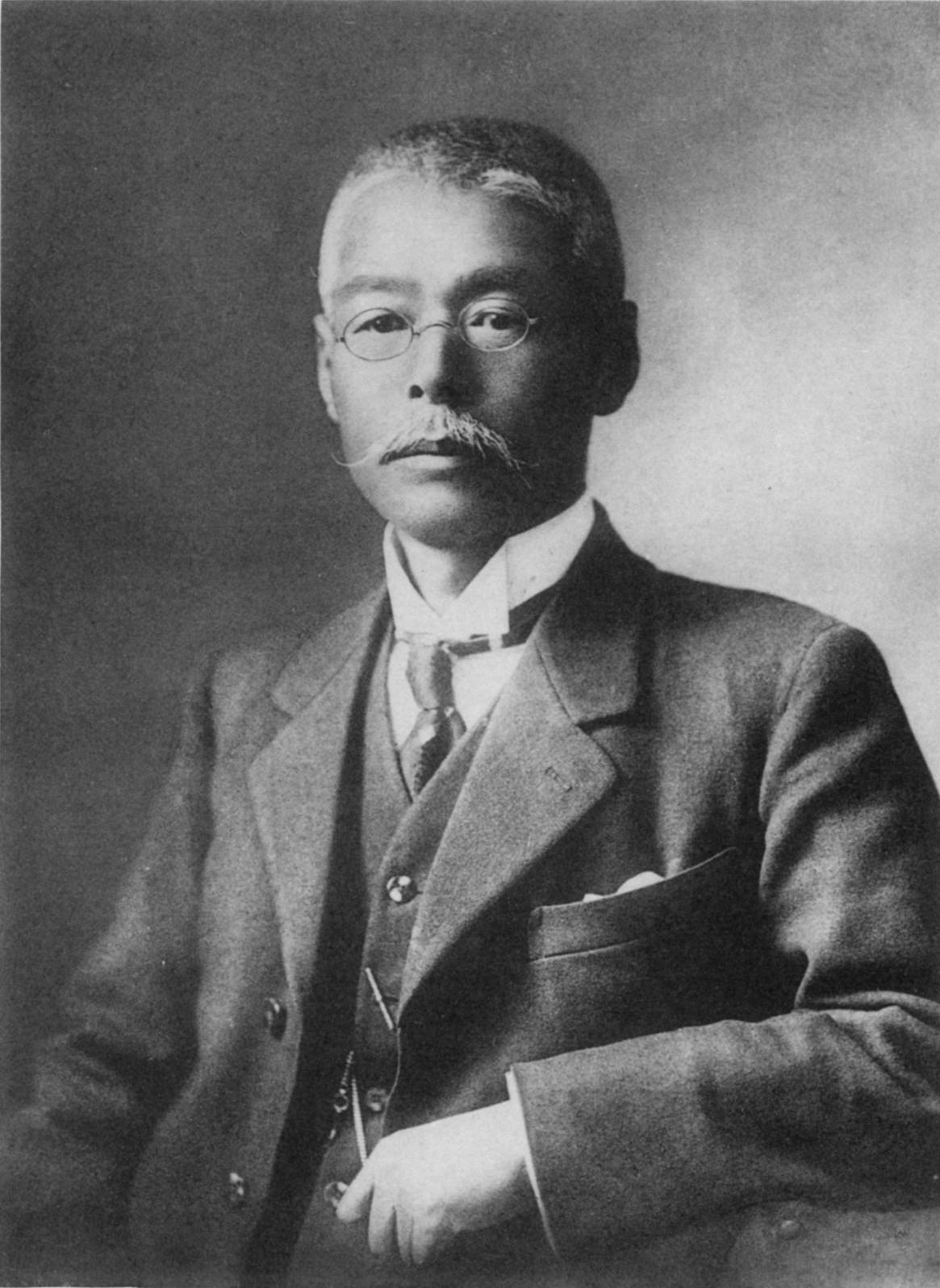
- Born: July 24, 1861
- Died: March 14, 1921 (aged 59)
- Education: Imperial University, Tokyo
- Occupations: Zoologist; Ichthyologist; Ornithologist
- Employer: Tokyo Imperial University
- Known for: Founder of Parasitology

Isao Ijima (飯島魁, Iijma Isao; July 24, 1861 – March 14, 1921) was a Japanese zoologist known for his studies of sponges (Porifera) — including his circumscription of the genus Staurocalyptus — leeches (Hirudinea), flatworms (Turbellaria), birds, and fish. Professor of Zoology at Tokyo Imperial University, he is considered the founder of parasitology in Japan and was the first President of the Ornithological Society of Japan. Taxa named in his honour include Ijima's sea snake and Ijima's leaf warbler.

== Biography ==
Born in Hamamatsu in 1861 into a samurai family of Hamamatsu Domain, at the age of fifteen he entered the Kaisei Gakkō school in Tokyo, before enrolling as a student in the Science College at the Imperial University, Tokyo in 1878. There he studied under Edward Sylvester Morse and Charles Otis Whitman. In 1879, together with Sasaki Chūjirō, both having previously received training from and assisted Morse in his exploration of the Ōmori Shell Mounds, Ijima excavated the Okadaira Shell Mound; this is credited with being the first modern archaeological survey conducted solely by Japanese. Upon graduation in 1881, as one of three from the first cohort in the Department of Zoology, he became an assistant in the College. The next year he went to Germany to study zoology at the University of Leipzig, where he spent three years working under the direction of Doctor Rudolf Leuckart; he was awarded his Ph.D. in 1884.

Returning to Japan in 1886, at the age of 25 he was appointed Professor of Zoology at the Imperial University, Tokyo, where he remained until his death. In 1893, with the description of Parus owstoni (now Sittiparus owstoni or Owston's tit), he became the first zoologist from Japan to describe a bird. In 1903, he was involved in the establishment of Sakai Aquarium and in 1904 he was appointed the second director of the Misaki Marine Biological Station. In 1912, he was the founding president of the Ornithological Society of Japan. In 1918, he published his influential A Manual of Zoology (動物学提要, Dōbutsu-gaku Teiyō). In his personal life, Ijima enjoyed hunting, shooting, fishing, wine, and smoking a pipe. He died in 1921.

== See also ==
- Eponyms of Isao Ijima
