= Ryukyu shrew =

Conservation status
- Endangered (IUCN 3.1)

Scientific classification
- Kingdom: Animalia
- Phylum: Chordata
- Class: Mammalia
- Order: Eulipotyphla
- Family: Soricidae
- Genus: Crocidura
- Species: C. orii

Binomial name
- Crocidura orii Kuroda, 1924
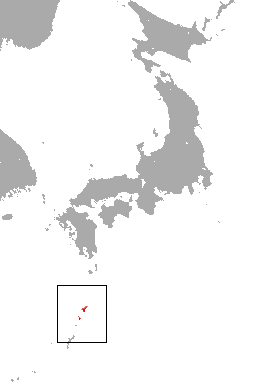
- Ryukyu Shrew range

Synonyms
- Crocidura dsinezumi orii (protonym); Crocidura russula orii

Species of mammal

The Ryukyu shrew (Crocidura orii), also known as Orii's shrew, is a species of mammal in the family Soricidae. This species is endemic to the Amami Islands of Japan and is threatened by habitat loss and invasive species.

== Taxonomy ==
Orii's shrew was first described, as a subspecies of the Dsinezumi shrew (Crocidura dsinezumi orii), by Kuroda Nagamichi in 1924; he named it after his collector, Orii Hyōjirō, who had provided the skin and skull of a single male from Amami Ōshima. This type specimen, damaged during the initial trapping, was destroyed by fire in 1945. In their 1951 checklist, Ellerman and Morrison-Scott listed the shrew instead as a subspecies of the Greater white-toothed shrew (Crocidura russula orii). In 1961, after the recovery of a second individual from the stomach of a hime habu or Ryukyu Island pit viper (Ovophis okinavensis), Yoshinori Imaizumi elevated the shrew to species rank, based on morphological comparison with other species of Crocidura. In 1998, after the study of five further specimens from Amami Ōshima and Tokunoshima, Motokawa Masaharuja confirmed this taxonomic treatment.

== Characteristics and Habitat ==
Orii's shrew is small in size, ranging from 65-90 millimeters on average. The hairs on Orii's shrew may range from a light grey to brown color. These hairs are longer than the hairs of any other species of the Crocidura genus by 2 millimeters on average. The forefeet are large and wide with long claws and the tail is 50-66% of the length of the body on average. Orii's shrew is characterized by having a long mandible, large teeth, and a round forehead.

Orii's shrew is endemic to the Amami Islands in Japan. Orii's shrew only inhabits the natural broadleaf forests of the island, however, their morphology leads scientists to believe semi-fossorial habitats would be inhabitable.

== Conservation ==
Only 10 specimens of Orii's shrew have been observed. The species was classified as endangered on the IUCN Red List in 2015 after the population began to decline. This decline is due to the introduction of mongooses as predators and the removal of natural forest space. Mongooses have migrated to Amami Island and are killing shrews from an already small population The habitat is being degraded and fragmented due to roads being built through the forest. These roads have been continuously built and destroyed over the past 50 years, which continually degraded the environment and displaces the species. Only 15-30% of the natural forests remain intact on Amami Island.
