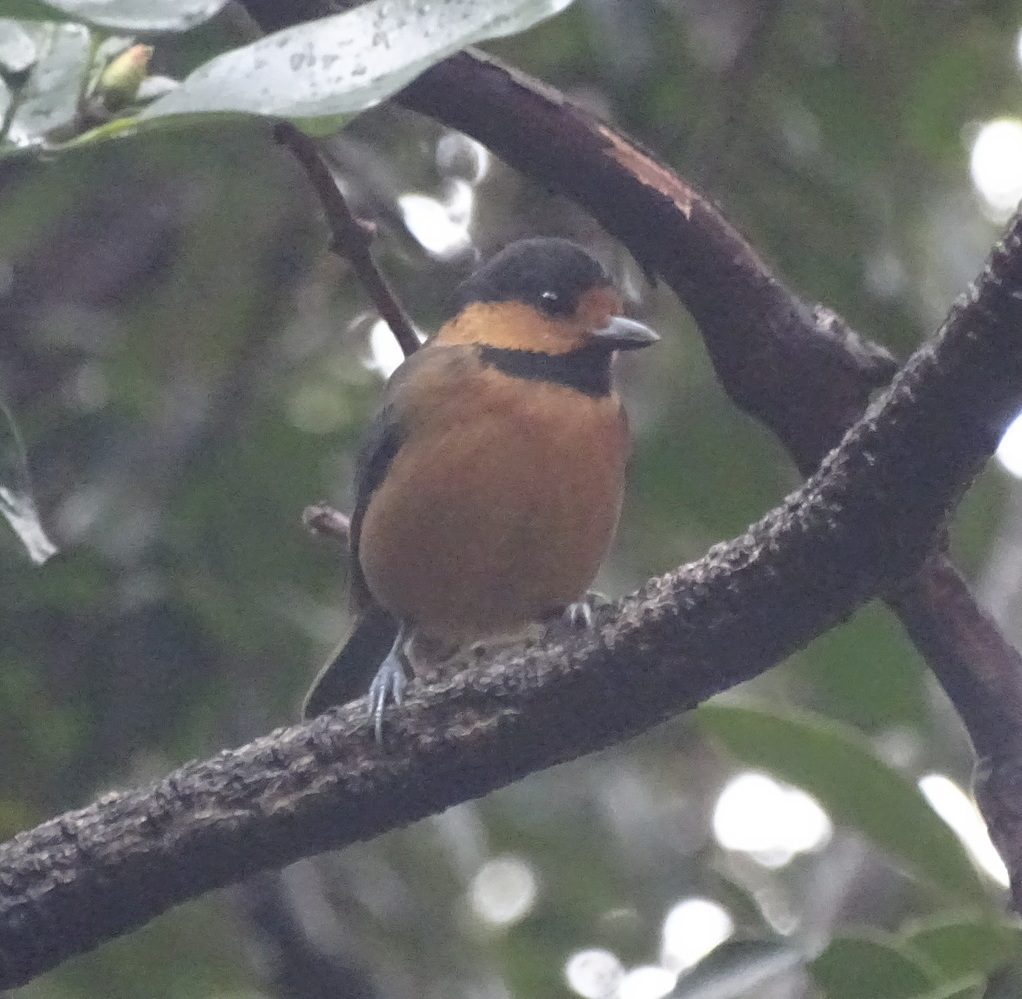

Conservation status
- Endangered (IUCN 3.1)

Scientific classification
- Kingdom: Animalia
- Phylum: Chordata
- Class: Aves
- Order: Passeriformes
- Family: Paridae
- Genus: Sittiparus
- Species: S. owstoni

Binomial name
- Sittiparus owstoni (Ijima, 1893)

Synonyms
- Parus varius (protonym); Sittiparus varius owstoni; Poecile varius owstoni

= Owston's tit =

Species of bird

Owston's tit (Sittiparus owstoni) is a small passerine bird in the tit family Paridae that is endemic to the southern Izu Islands south of Japan, occurring only on the islands of Miyakejima, Mikurajima and Hachijojima.

Owston's tit was formerly considered as subspecies of the varied tit but was promoted to species status based on the results of a phylogenetic study published in 2014. The species was first described by Ijima Isao in 1893, based on two females from Miyake-jima obtained by Alan Owston's collector, and named Parus owstoni in his honour. This was the first description of a bird by a zoologist from Japan.

It is larger than the varied tit, and lacks the buffish forehead and side of neck.
