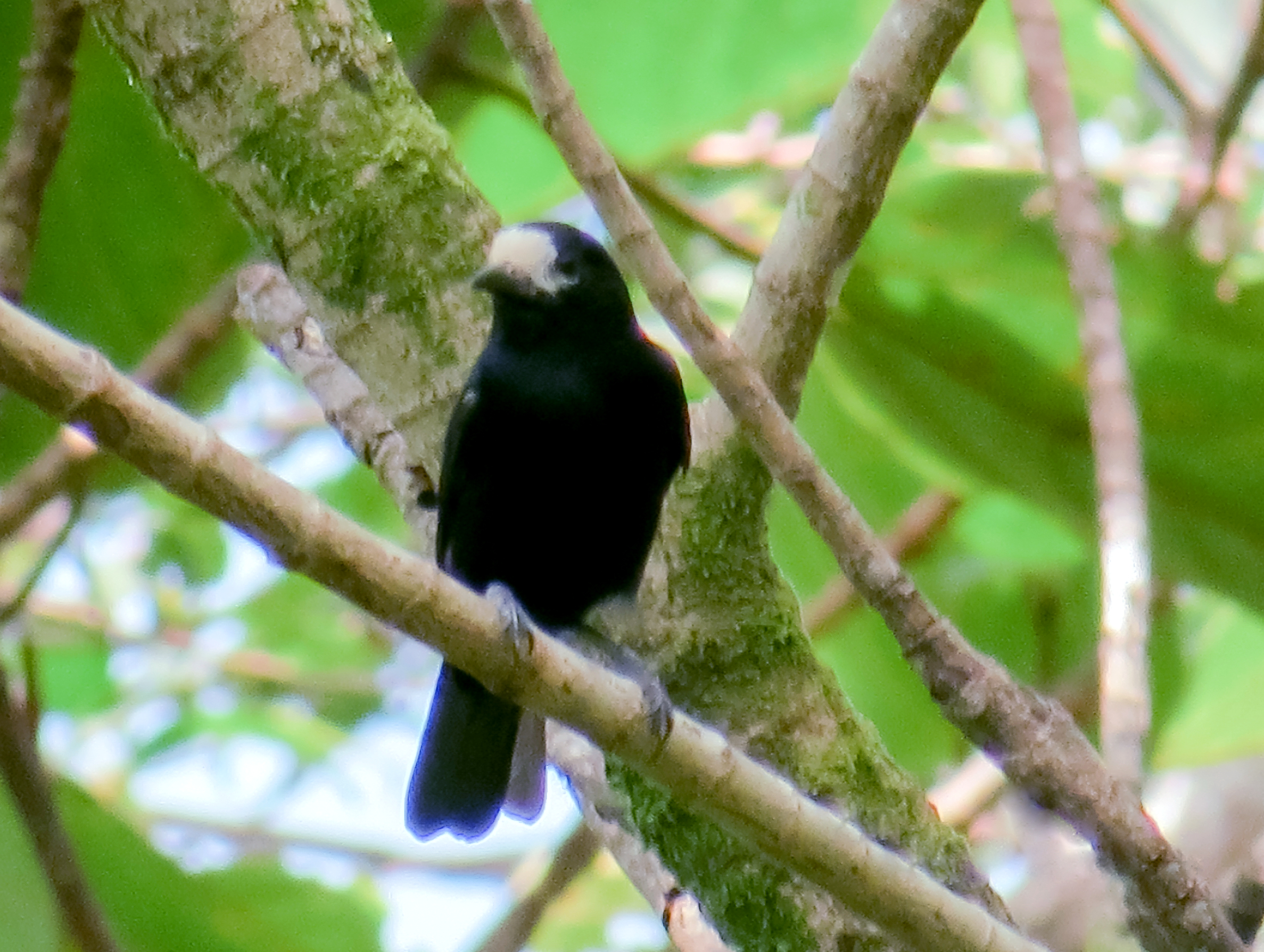
- The nominate subspecies seen in Quezon

Conservation status
- Near Threatened (IUCN 3.1)

Scientific classification
- Kingdom: Animalia
- Phylum: Chordata
- Class: Aves
- Order: Passeriformes
- Family: Paridae
- Genus: Sittiparus
- Species: S. semilarvatus

Binomial name
- Sittiparus semilarvatus (Salvadori, 1866)

Synonyms
- Cyanistes semilarvatus Poecile semilarvatus

= White-fronted tit =

Species of bird

The white-fronted tit (Sittiparus semilarvatus) is a species of bird in the family Paridae. It is endemic to the Philippines found in the islands of Luzon and Mindanao. Its natural habitat is tropical moist lowland forests and is typpically found in the cannopy. It is threatened by habitat loss.

== Description and taxonomy ==
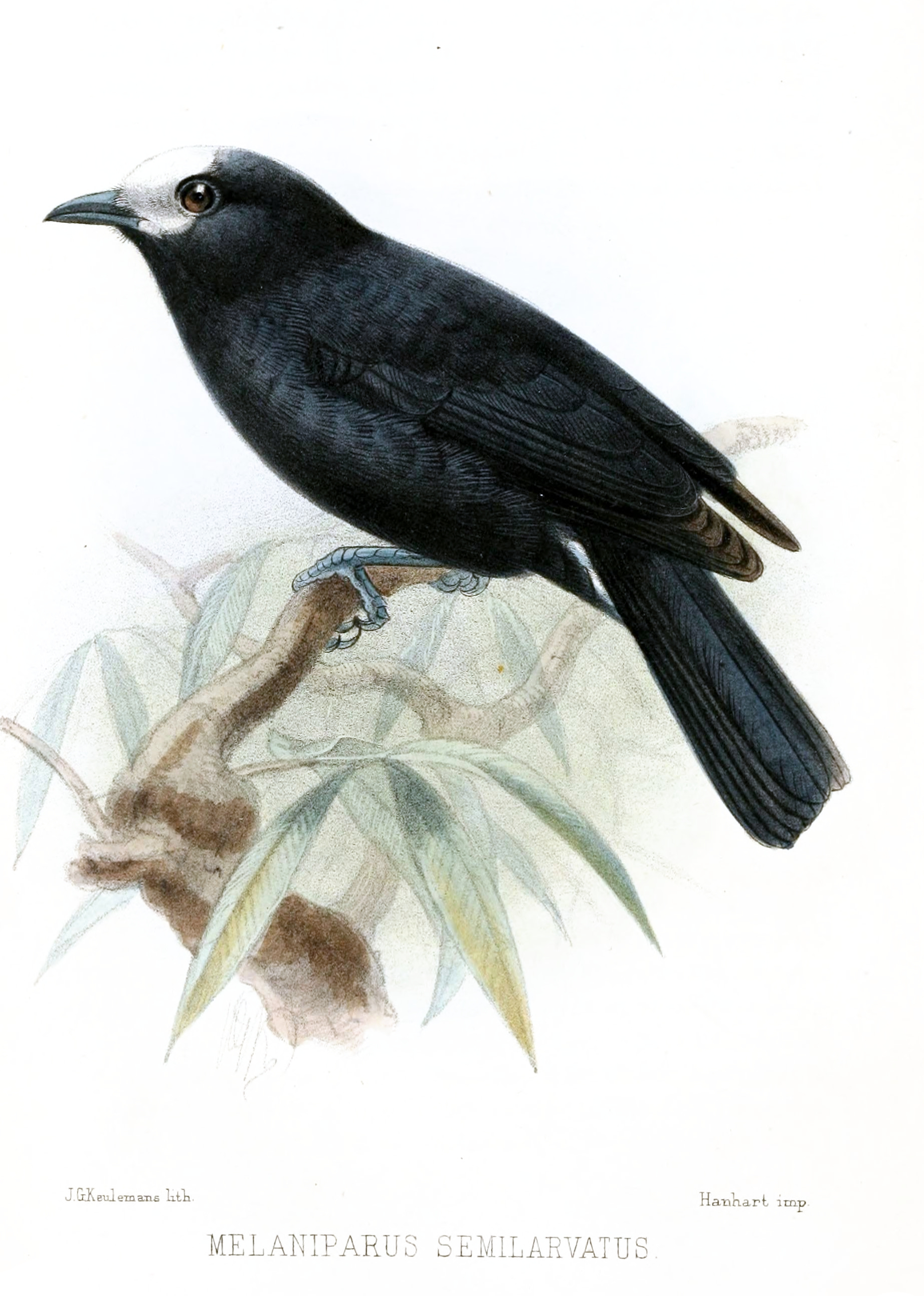
An illustration by J. G. Keulemans (1879)

A small, uncommon bird of lowland and foothill forest canopy and edge. Entirely dark with an obvious white mark from the forehead down between the bill and eye. Males are entirely black, and females have dark brown underparts. Varies regionally, with Mindanao birds having an additional white mark in the wing. Unmistakable. Voice includes a downslurred series of three fairly high-pitched downslurred notes, "piu-piu piu". Also gives a rapid staccato trill." It is often seen in exposed branches in the canopy.

The white-fronted tit was formally described by the Italian ornithologist Tommaso Salvadori in 1865 under the binomial name Melaniparus semilarvatus. The species was formerly included in the genus Parus but was moved to Sittiparus when Parus was split into several resurrected genera following the publication of a detailed molecular phylogenetic analysis in 2013. The genus Sittiparus had originally been erected by the Belgium politician and naturalist Edmond de Sélys Longchamps in 1884 with the varied tit as the type species.

=== Subspecies ===
There are three subspecies:

- S. s. semilarvatus (Salvadori, 1865) – central and southern Luzon;
- S. s. snowi (Parkes, 1971) – north east Luzon; has white patch on the wing and less glossy appearance, females have white patches in its collar
- S. s. nehrkorni (Blasius, W, 1890) – Mindanao; similar to snowi but an even larger white patch on wing

== Ecology and behavior ==
The diet of this species is not well known, but it is presumed to be insectivorous. It is usually found either alone, in pairs, in flocks of up to 10 and mixed species flocks with other small birds like elegant tits and stripe-headed rhabdornis.

Breeding is also poorly known. A pair was seen inspecting a nest hole in February. A fledged juvenile was seen in March and adults in breeding condition with enlarged gonads have been collected in May.

== Habitat and conservation status ==
IUCN has assessed this bird as near threatened. This species' main threat is habitat loss with wholesale clearance of forest habitats as a result of logging, agricultural conversion and mining activities occurring within the range.

There are no species-specific conservation measures, but it does occur in protected areas, such as the Northern Sierra Madre Natural Park and Bataan National Park.
