= Okadaira Shell Mound =

Archeological site

Okadaira Shell Midden
- 陸平貝塚 (Japanese)
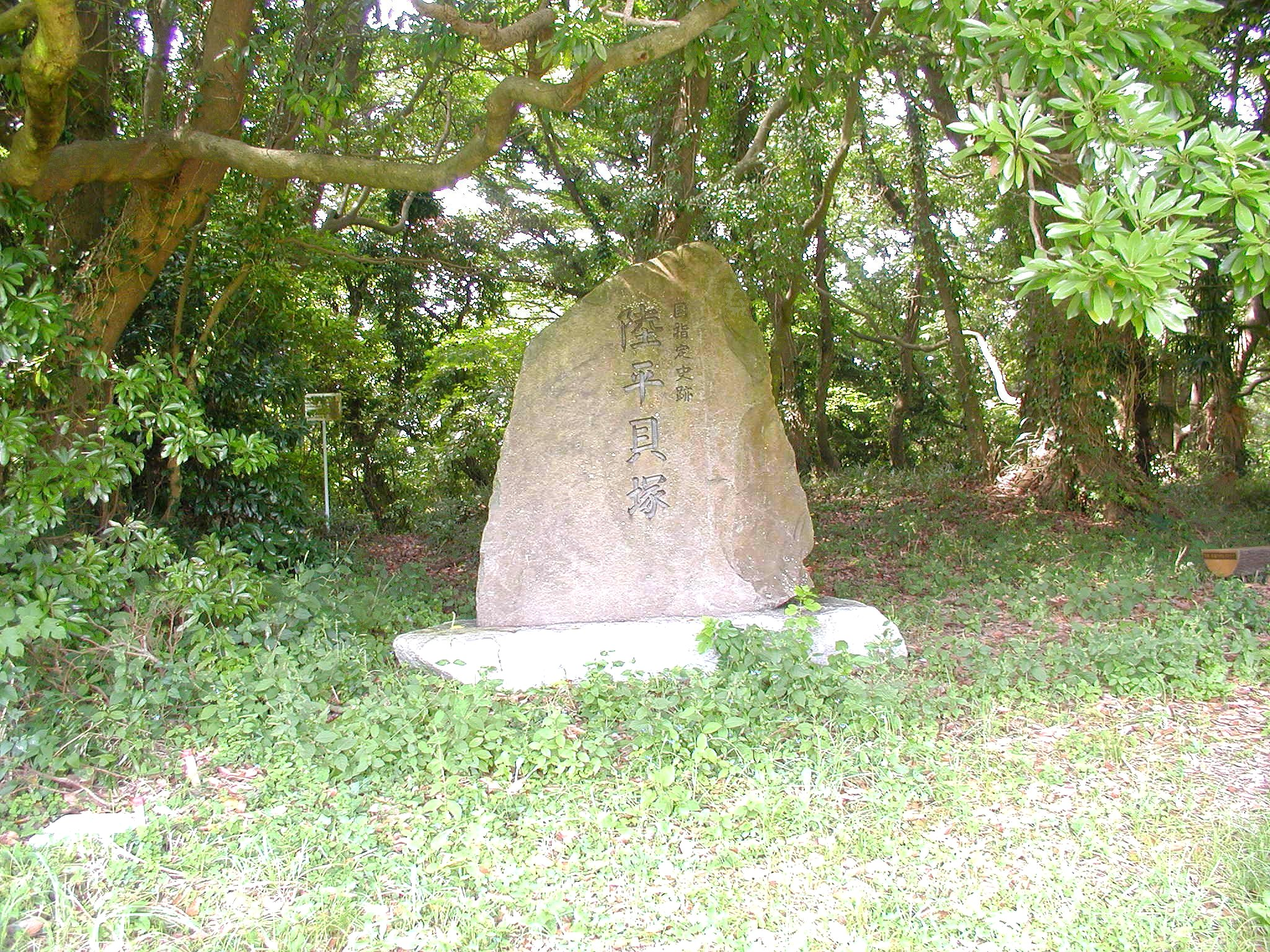

- Okadaira Shell Midden Okadaira Shell Mound (Japan)
- 36°01′02″N 140°20′57″E
- Type: shell midden
- Periods: Jōmon period
- Location: Miho, Ibaraki, Japan
- Region: Kantō region

Site notes
- Public access: Yes (park and museum)

The Okadaira Shell Midden (陸平貝塚, Okadaira kaizuka) is an archaeological site in the Iide area of the village of Miho, Ibaraki Prefecture, in the northern Kantō region of Japan containing a late Jōmon period shell midden. The site was designated a National Historic Site of Japan in 1998.

== Overview ==
During the early to middle Jōmon period (approximately 4000 to 2500 BC), sea levels were five to six meters higher than at present, and the ambient temperature was also 2 deg C higher. During this period, the Kantō region was inhabited by the Jōmon people, many of whom lived in coastal settlements. The middens associated with such settlements contain bone, botanical material, mollusc shells, sherds, lithics, and other artifacts and ecofacts associated with the now-vanished inhabitants, and these features, provide a useful source into the diets and habits of Jōmon society. Most of these middens are found along the Pacific coast of Japan.

The Okadaira ring-shaped shell midden and its village ruin date from the early to late Jōmon period (about 7000 to 3500 years ago), and is located in the center of the south coast of Lake Kasumigaura at an elevation of 20 to 30 meters, on what is believed to have been an island in Lake Kasumigaura during this period. It is one of the largest shell middens in Japan. The site is noteworthy as the first site to have been excavated by Japanese archaeologists in the Meiji period. Tadajiro Sasaki and Isao Iijima were Tokyo Imperial University students who received training by working with the American naturalist Edward S. Morse in 1879 on the famous Ōmori Shell Mounds near Tokyo.

The site is located on a tongue-shaped plateau and measures approximately 250 meter east-to-west by 150 meters north-to-south, and consists of eight large and small shell mounds are scattered on the slope of the plateau. The shell layer is distributed in a ring shape, and Jōmon pottery and clay figurines, stone tools, bone fishhooks and shellfish products have been excavated. Regarding organic remains, the midden contained many varieties of shellfish from inner bay environments, as well as fish bones and bones from animals such as deer, boars, and rabbits.

Despite the site's historic importance, it was scheduled for destruction in the 1970s, when a real estate developer planned to build a resort and residential housing area on the lakeshore and touted plans for "development and preservation in parallel". These plans fell through with Japan's "bubble economy" collapse in the 1980s. In the 1990s, a volunteer group began funding new excavations, and the area received national government protection in 1998. Based on the excavation surveys, an archaeological park with restorations of pit dwellings has been created along with an on-site museum. The site is a 25-minute walk from the Otani bus stop on the JR Bus from Tsuchiura Station on the JR East Jōban Line.

== Gallery ==
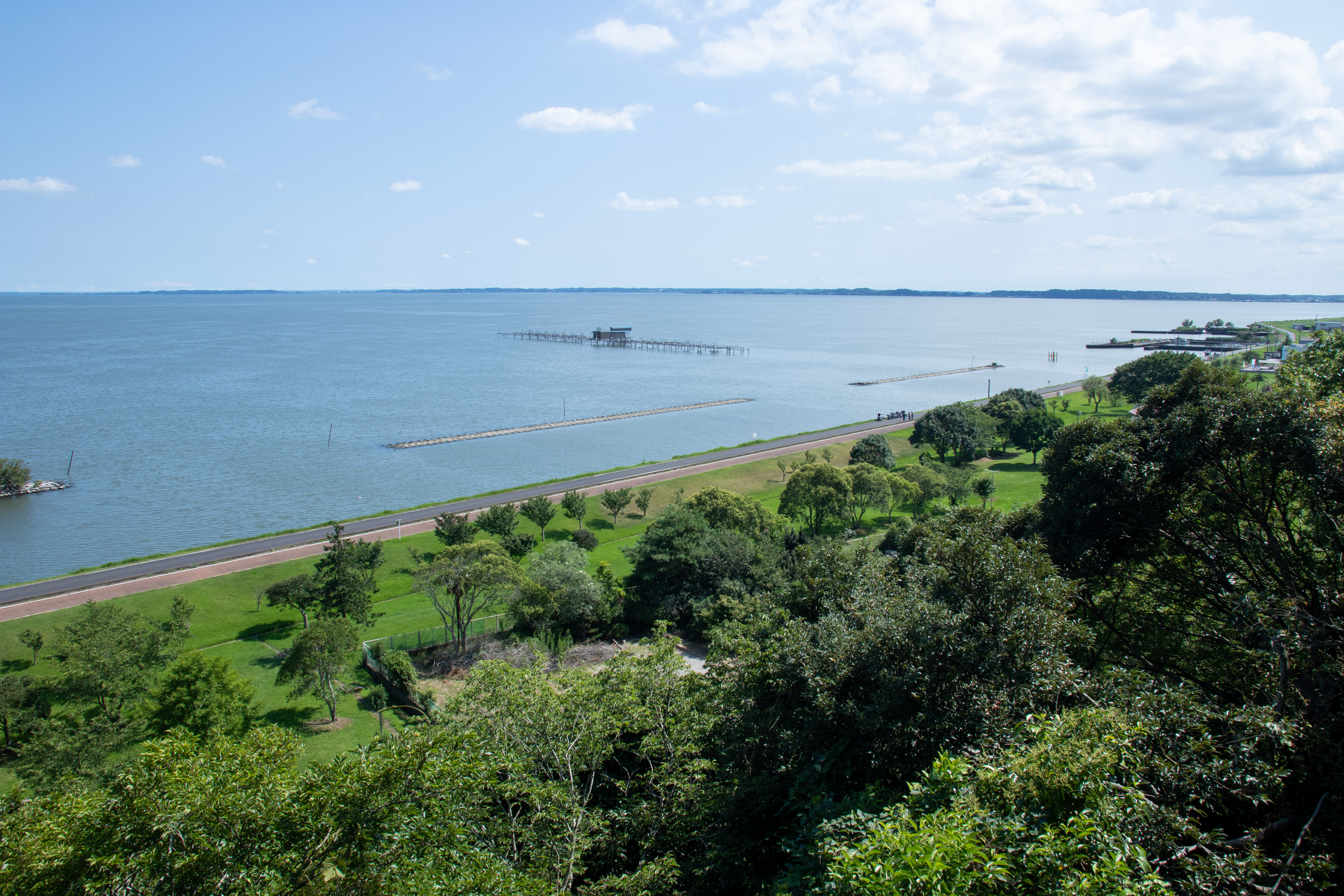
View over Lake Kasumigaura from the site

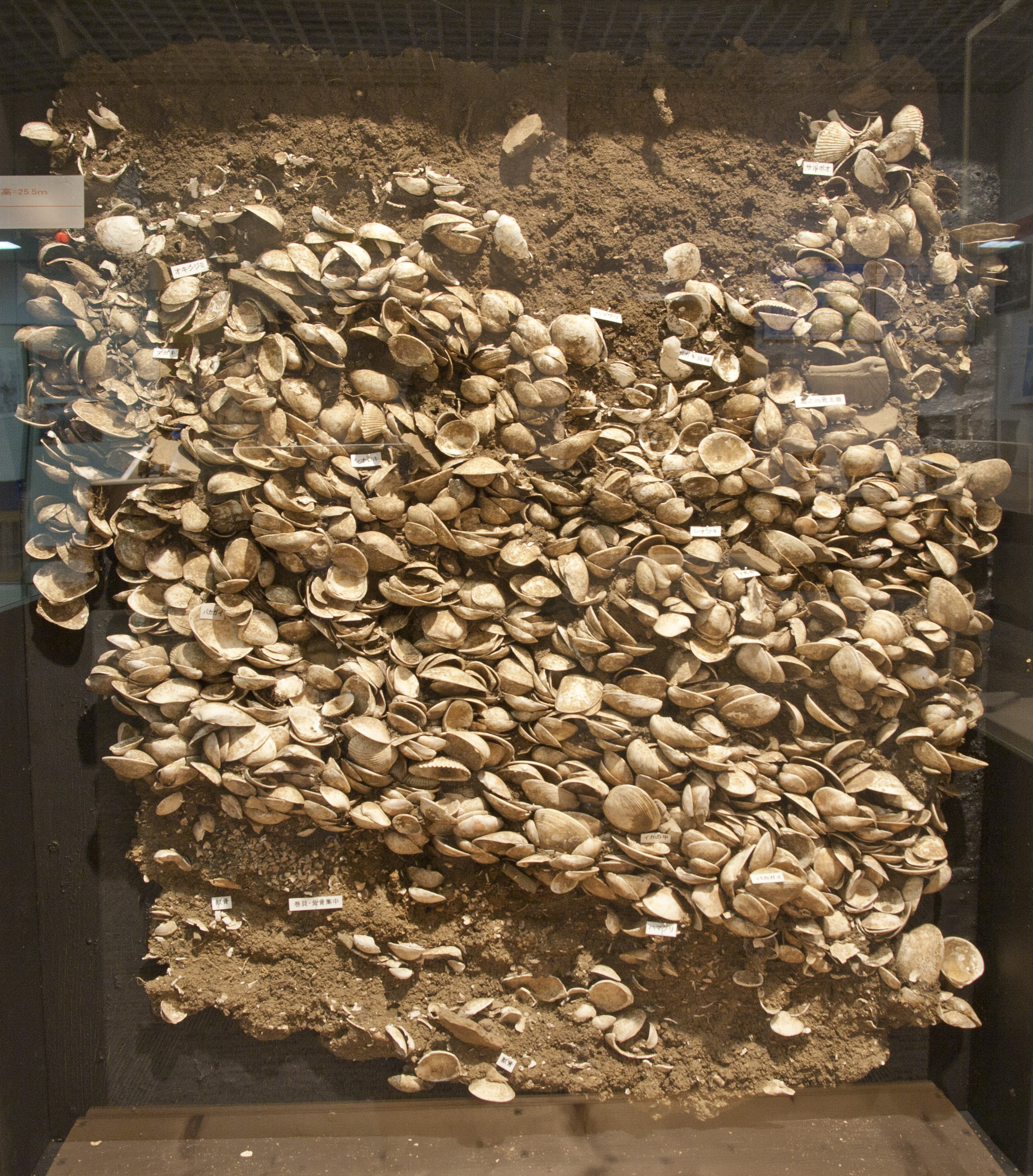
Shell layers of Okadaira Shell Mounds

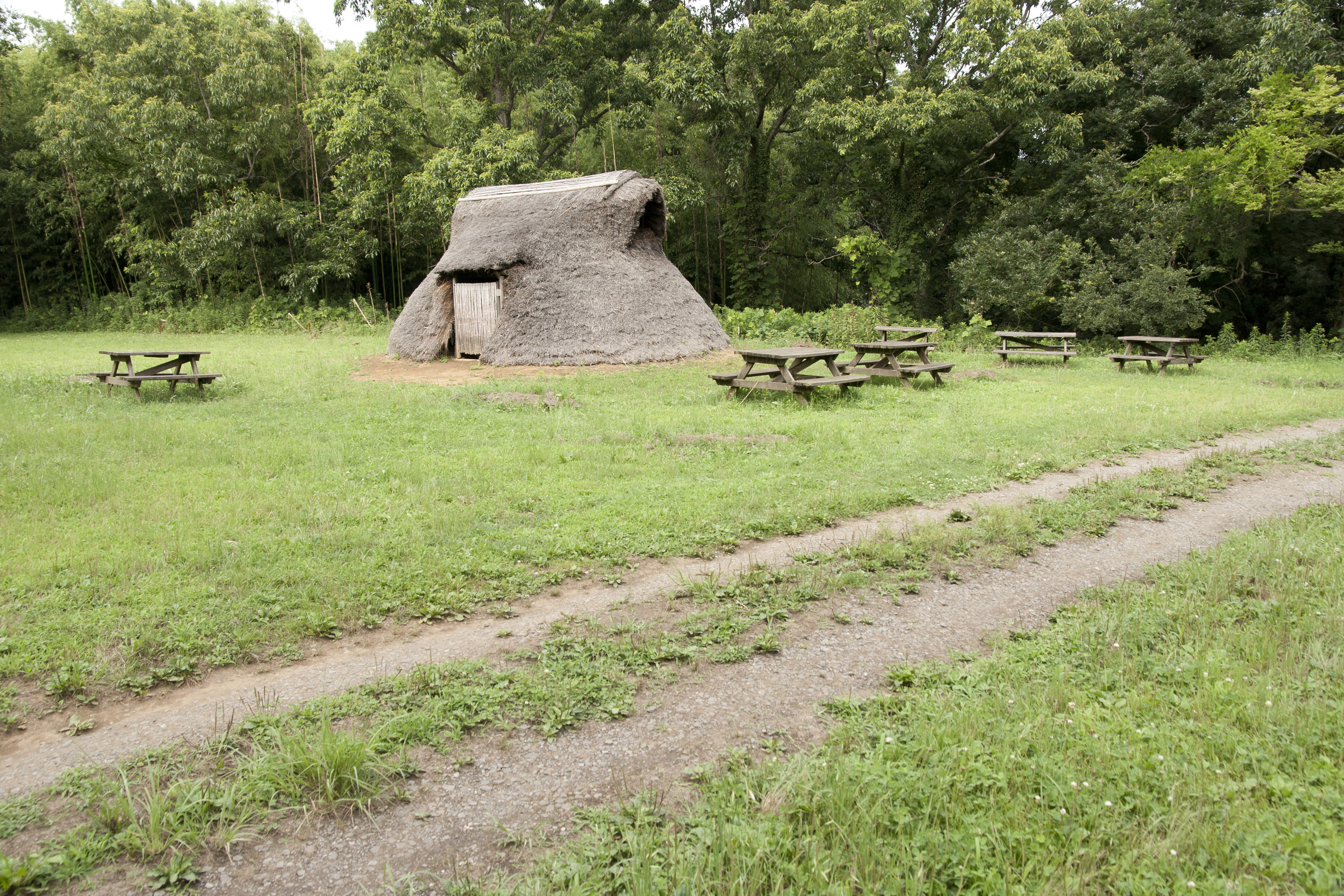
Okadaira Shell Mounds Park

== See also ==
- List of Historic Sites of Japan (Ibaraki)
