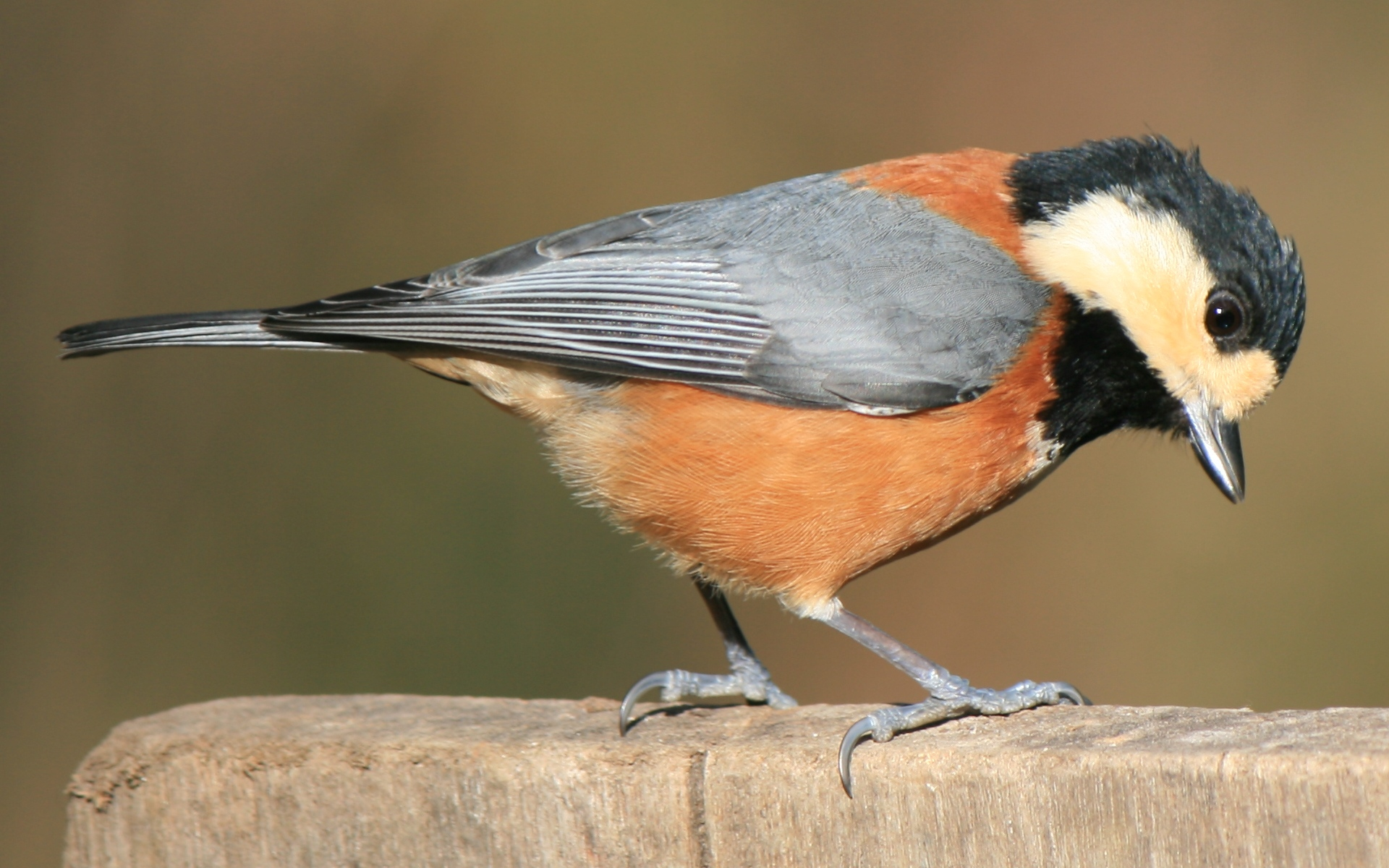
- Varied tit (Sittiparus varius)

Scientific classification
- Kingdom: Animalia
- Phylum: Chordata
- Class: Aves
- Order: Passeriformes
- Family: Paridae
- Genus: Sittiparus de Sélys-Longchamps, 1884

Type species
- Parus varius Temminck & Schlegel, 1845

Species
- See text

= Sittiparus =

Genus of birds

Sittiparus is a genus of birds in the tit family Paridae. The species in the genus were formerly included in Parus but were moved to Sittiparus when Parus was split into several resurrected genera following the publication of a detailed molecular phylogenetic analysis in 2013. The genus Sittiparus had originally been erected by the Belgian politician and naturalist Edmond de Sélys Longchamps in 1884 with the varied tit as the type species.

The genus contains the following species:

Image	Scientific name	Common name	Distribution
	Sittiparus varius	Varied tit	eastern Asia in Japan, Korea, and locally in northeastern China (southern Liaoning) and extreme southeastern Russia (southern Kurile Islands)
	Sittiparus owstoni (split from S. varius)	Owston's tit	southern Izu Islands south of Japan
	Sittiparus olivaceus (split from S. varius)	Iriomote tit	south west of Japan and to the east of Taiwan
	Sittiparus castaneoventris (split from S. varius)	Chestnut-bellied tit	Taiwan
	Sittiparus semilarvatus	White-fronted tit	Philippines

The subspecies Daito varied tit, S. v. orii, became extinct in the 1940s, the only tit to have done so.
