= Tomakomai City Museum =

- 苫小牧市美術博物館
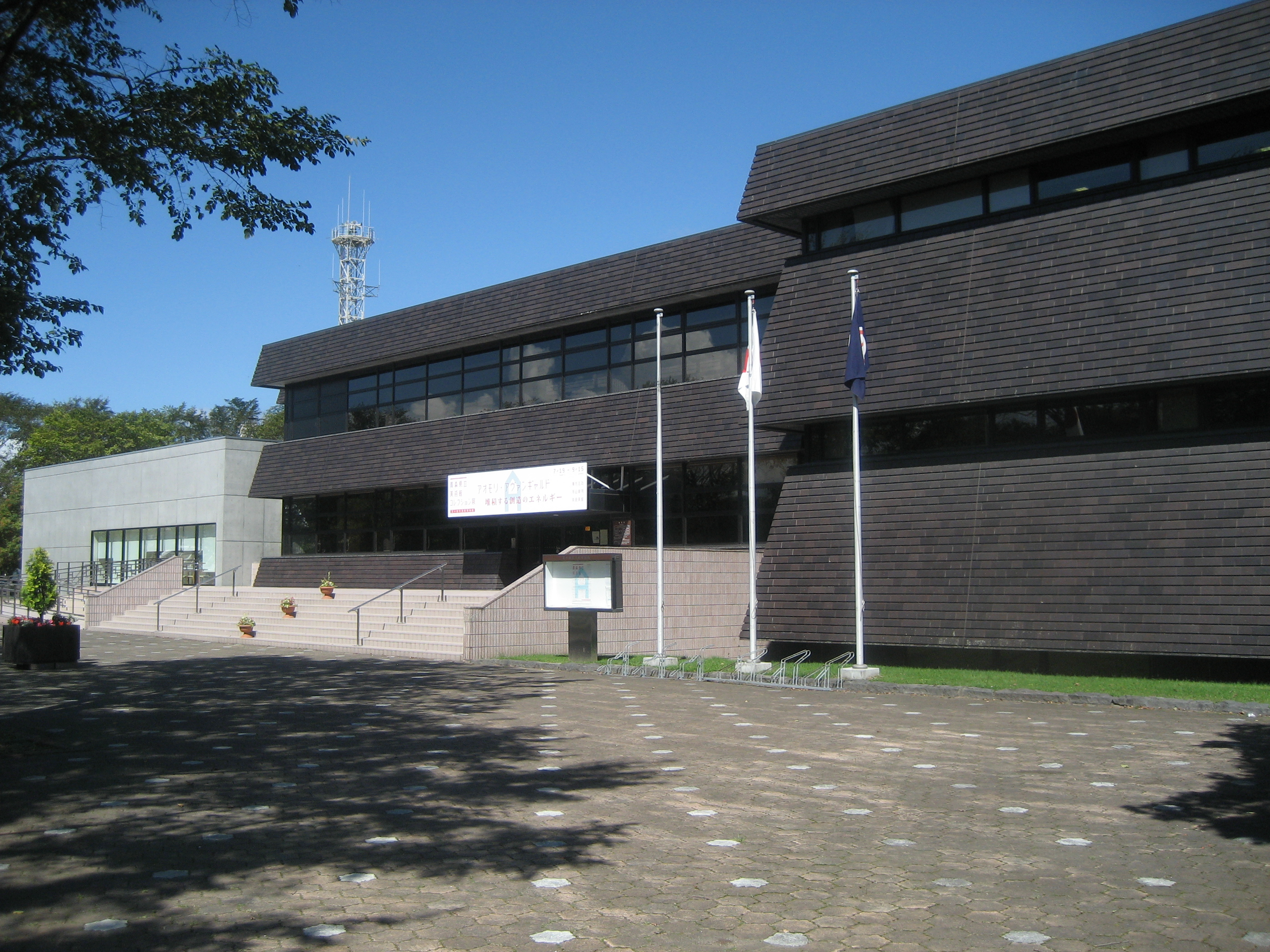
- Interactive map of the Tomakomai City Museum area

General information
- Location: 3-9-7 Suehiro-chō, Tomakomai, Hokkaidō, Japan
- Coordinates: 42°38′15″N 141°36′46″E
- Opened: 3 November 1985

Website
- Official website

Tomakomai City Museum (苫小牧市美術博物館, Tomakomai-shi Bijutsu-Hakubutsukan) opened in Tomakomai, Hokkaidō, Japan in 1985. The museum reopened after renewal work in 2013. The collection and display documents the natural and cultural history of the city and the area, and includes specimens collected by local resident Orii Hyōjirō as well as materials relating to the Ainu and the time of the Hokkaidō Development Commission.

== See also ==
- Hokkaido Museum
