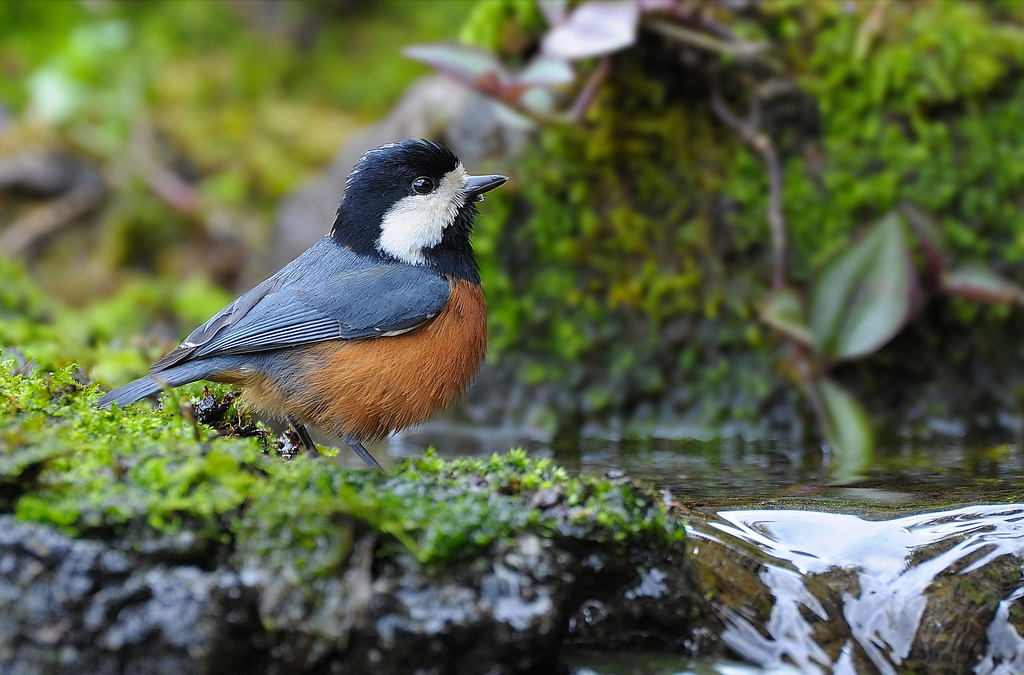

Conservation status
- Least Concern (IUCN 3.1)

Scientific classification
- Kingdom: Animalia
- Phylum: Chordata
- Class: Aves
- Order: Passeriformes
- Family: Paridae
- Genus: Sittiparus
- Species: S. castaneoventris

Binomial name
- Sittiparus castaneoventris (Gould, 1863)

Synonyms
- Parus castaneoventris; Sittiparus varius castaneoventris; Poecile varius castaneoventris

= Chestnut-bellied tit =

Species of bird

The chestnut-bellied tit (Sittiparus castaneoventris) is a small passerine bird in the tit family Paridae that is endemic to Taiwan.

The chestnut-bellied tit was first described by the English ornithologist John Gould in 1863 and given the binomial name Parus castaneoventris. It was formerly considered as a subspecies of the varied tit but was promoted to species status after the publication of a phylogenetic study in 2014.

The species differs from the varied tit in having underparts of a deep chestnut colour.

== See also ==
- PARUS (Taiwanese satellite family)
