= Japanese Society for Preservation of Birds =

Japanese wildlife protection foundation

- 日本鳥類保護連盟
- Formation: March 1947
- Purpose: Conservation
- Headquarters: 3F, 10th Tanaka Building, 3-54-5 Wada, Suginami, Tōkyō, Japan
- Coordinates: 35°41′51″N 139°39′18″E
- Key people: Prince Hitachi (President); Satsuki Eda (Representative)
- Website: Official website

The Japanese Society for Preservation of Birds (公益財団法人 日本鳥類保護連盟, Kōeki zaidan hōjin Nihon chōrui hogo renmei), sometimes the "Japanese Association for Preservation of Birds", was founded in 1947, incorporating ten years later, and becoming a Public Interest Incorporated Foundation in 2012. The Society's purpose is "to protect wildlife primarily birds, to promote its conservation, and to contribute to the preservation of biodiversity".

== See also ==
- List of Ramsar sites in Japan
- Wildlife Protection Areas in Japan
- Japan–Australia Migratory Bird Agreement
- Wild Bird Society of Japan
- List of birds of Japan
- Red List (Ministry of the Environment, Japan) - birds
