= Lake Utonai =

- ウトナイ湖 (Japanese)
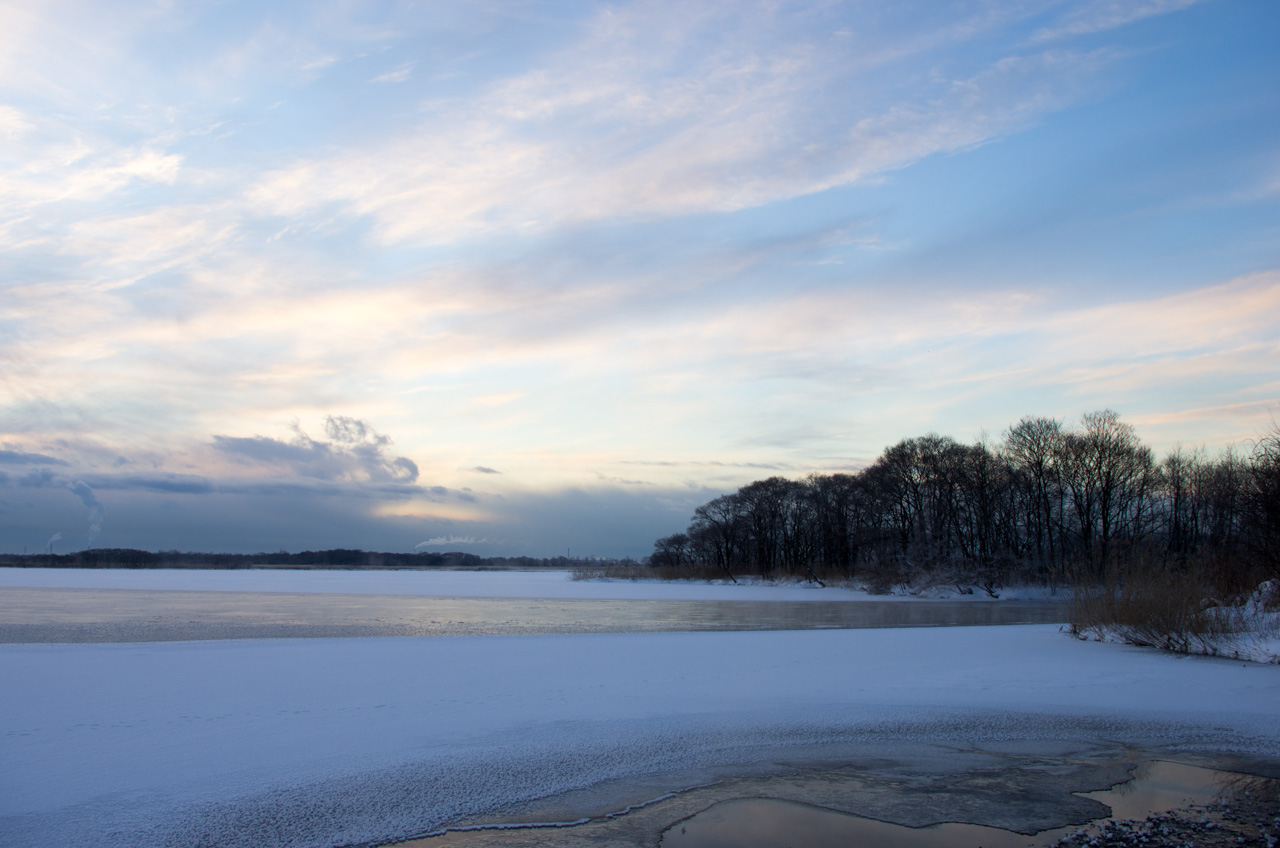
- Lake Utonai

- Location within Japan
- Location: Tomakomai, Hokkaido, Japan
- Coordinates: 42°41′56″N 141°42′40″E
- Type: Freshwater lake
- Etymology: Ainu meaning "where small streams gather"
- Basin countries: Japan
- Surface area: 2.20 square kilometres (0.85 sq mi)
- Average depth: 0.6 metres (2.0 ft)
- Max. depth: 1.5 metres (4.9 ft)
- Shore length^{1}: 9.5 kilometres (5.9 mi)
- Surface elevation: 3 metres (9.8 ft)
- ^{1} Shore length is not a well-defined measure.

Designations

Ramsar Wetland
- Official name: Utonai-ko
- Designated: 12 December 1991
- Reference no.: 539

Lake Utonai (ウトナイ湖, Utonai-ko) is a shallow freshwater lake in Tomakomai, Iburi Subprefecture, Hokkaidō, Japan. It is within the Lake Utonai Sanctuary, created in 1981 as the first bird sanctuary designated in Japan. It later became the fourth Ramsar site in Japan in 1989.

Other names include Kim-un-to, Kimke-to, Utnay-to, Utnay-tō, Utonai-numa, and Utsunai-numa.

== Etymology and history ==
There are multiple original Ainu names for Lake Utonai, including キムント (kim-un-to), meaning "a wetland with a mountain", and キムケト (kimke-to), meaning "wetland deep in the mountains". Other names and variations include ウッナイト (utnay-to), meaning "rib river wetland" or "where small streams come together" and ウトナイトー (utnay-tō). Utonai-numa (ウトナイ沼) and Utsunai-numa (宇都内沼) are also used.

Lake Utonai was the first designated bird sanctuary in Japan, through the efforts of the Wild Bird Society of Japan and the city of Tomakomai in 1981. The lake and the surrounding area was designated a Ramsar site in Japan in July 1989, the fourth such designation in Japan. It is designated a Special Protection Area of a National Wildlife Protection Area.

== Geography ==
Lake Utonai is a small lake, with an area of 2.20 square kilometres (0.85 sq mi), an average depth of 0.6 metres (2.0 ft), and a maximum depth of 1.5 metres (4.9 ft). The shorelines is approximately 9.5 kilometres (5.9 mi) long. Around the lake is a wide area of swampy wetland dotted with small ponds and bogs, all part of the Bibi River floodplain. The Yūfutsu River, which is part of the Abira River drainage system, flows into the lake through the eastern part of Tomakomai and also drains the lake. The Bibi, Otarumappu, and Tokisatamappu rivers also empty into the lake.

== Fauna and flora ==
The lake and the surrounding wetlands support a diverse population of animals and plants. More than 260 types of birds have been sighted in the area, including many that use Lake Utonai as a migration stop and wintering area. Thousands of ducks, swans, and geese use it, including the greater white-fronted goose, whooper swan, and tundra swan. Daily totals during peak migration can reach tens of thousands in one day. Other birds recorded there include the Canada goose, the Oriental stork, the northern goshawk, the white-tailed eagle, Steller's sea eagle, the peregrine falcon, the red-crowned crane, the eastern marsh harrier, and the yellow-breasted bunting.

Over 3900 types of insects have been identified as inhabiting the lake and its environs.

Lake Utonai is surrounded by a reed-sedge swamp, swamp forest, and stands of wild rice. Water plants such as tanukimo and hishi grow in the water, with clusters of makomo, yoshi, mizunara and haskap, and others growing along the edges. East Asian alder and Magnolia praecocissima var. borealis grow prolifically around the lake. More than 500 varieties of plants have been identified in and around the lake.

== Facilities ==
The creation of the Lake Utonai Sanctuary began in May 1976. In November that same year, a foundation was established to work toward that goal, collecting over ¥100 million. In May 1979, Lake Utonai was selected as the location for the first bird sanctuary for the foundation in order to protect it from increased development in the area. The groundbreaking for the nature center was held in February 1980, and volunteer camps were held in August 1980 and March 1981. The nature center officially opened on 10 May 1981.

The sanctuary protects 510 hectares (2.0 sq mi), including Lake Utonai and much of the surrounding area. This area is the only remaining wetland area on the Yūfutsu flood plain.

== See also ==
- List of Ramsar sites in Japan
