= Ōmori Shell Mounds =

- 大森貝塚 (Japanese)
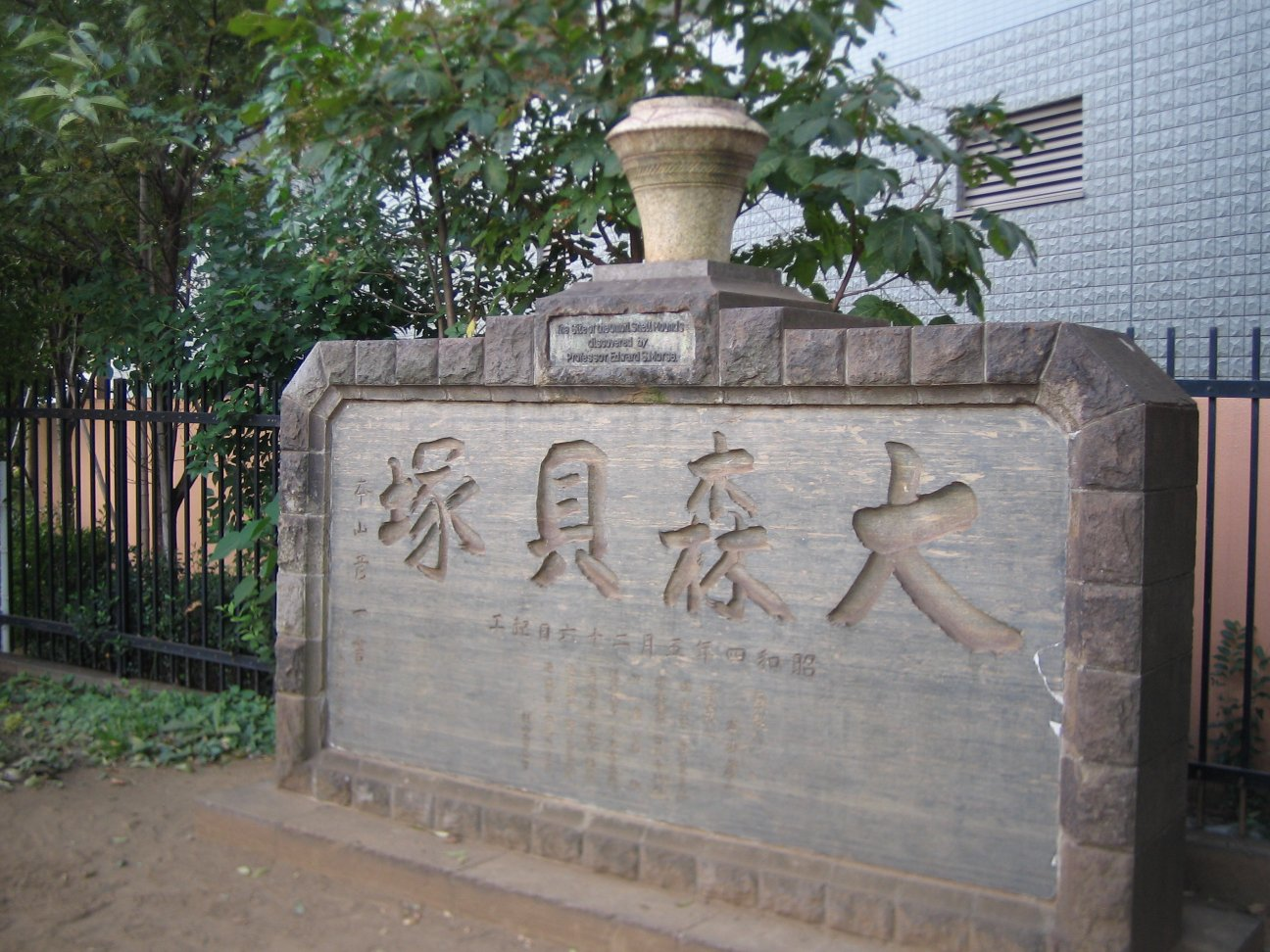
- Ōmori kaizuka

- Ōmori Shell Midden Ōmori Shell Mounds (Japan)
- 35°35′26.8″N 139°43′45″E
- Type: shell midden, settlement
- Periods: late Jōmon period
- Location: Saitama, Saitama, Japan
- Region: Kantō region

Site notes
- Public access: Yes (no public facilities)

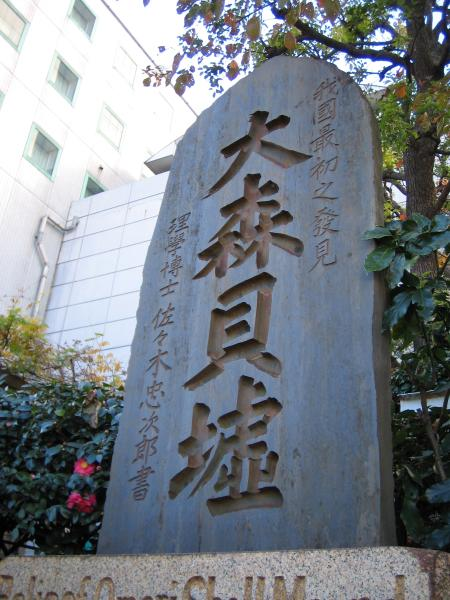
Ōmori Shell Mounds Memorial in Ōta

The Ōmori Shell Mounds (大森貝塚, Ōmori kaizuka) was an archaeological site on the border of Shinagawa, Tokyo and Ōta, Tokyo, in the Kantō region of Japan containing a late Jōmon period shell midden and settlement ruin. The site was designated a National Historic Site of Japan in 1955, with the area under protection extended in 1986.

== Overview ==
During the early to middle Jōmon period (approximately 4000 to 2500 BC), sea levels were five to six meters higher than at present, and the ambient temperature was also 2 deg C higher. During this period, the Kantō region was inhabited by the Jōmon people, many of whom lived in coastal settlements. The middens associated with such settlements contain bone, botanical material, mollusc shells, sherds, lithics, and other artifacts and ecofacts associated with the now-vanished inhabitants, and these features, provide a useful source into the diets and habits of Jōmon society. Most of these middens are found along the Pacific coast of Japan.

An American scientist, Edward Sylvester Morse who was researching shellfish, planned a research project for Brachiopoda in Japan. He arrived in Yokohama on June 18, 1877 and while taking the Yokohama Shimbashi Railway (present day Tokaido Main Line) train to Tokyo on June 20, noticed what appeared to be a shell midden from the window of his train shortly past Ōmori Station. Using his position and influence at the newly established Tokyo Imperial University, he conducted an archaeological excavation of the shell midden several times from September to November 1877. The artifacts found were mainly Jōmon pottery, stone tools, bone tools, and animal and human bones, which were displayed at the university's museum in 1879. The pottery was from then late to the beginning of the final Jōmon period per modern classification systems. Morse published a report on his findings both in English and Japanese in 1879, with an especially detailed analysis of the shells found, noting evidence on changes in the environment based on the contents of the layers in the mound, and comparing with similar shell middens in other countries. He also emphasized the importance of protection of the cultural properties. However, the most important aspect of Morse's work was his introduction of modern techniques in laying the foundations scientific archaeology and anthropology in Japan. It was one of the earliest excavations of the shell mounds in the world, and it was fortuitous that Morse had previous experience in the excavations of the shell mounds in Florida before his arrival in Japan.

However, Morse kept no records of the details of the excavation itself, and over the years, the exact location of the site became uncertain. In 1929, a location in the Ōi neighborhood of Shinagawa was identified and marked with a stone monument as "The Shell Mounds of Omori". However, in 1930 a rival site located near Ōmori Station was identified and was also marked with a monument. The sites are separated by about 300 meters. As the original size of the shell midden was very large, it is possible that these two locations are part of the same midden. It is also possible that the Ōmori site was the one seen by Morse from his train window, whereas the Shinagawa site was where he actually excavated. In any case, both rival sites were collectively designated as a National Historic Site in 1955.

These shell mounds are now part of Ōmori Shell Mounds Garden, open to the public. In 1955, the sites were registered as Japan's Historic Sites. The shells, pottery, and other items that Dr. Morse excavated are mostly stored at the University Museum of the University of Tokyo and were designated as National Important Cultural Properties in 1975.

The Ōmori Shell Mounds are located within five-minutes' walk from the north entrance of Ōmori Railway Station of the JR Keihin–Tōhoku Line.

== See also ==
- List of Historic Sites of Japan (Tōkyō)
