= Nagahisa Kuroda =

Japanese ornithologist

Nagahisa Kuroda (黒田 長久 Kuroda Nagahisa, 23 November 1916 – 26 February 2009) was a Japanese ornithologist. He wrote several books on the birds of Japan and worked on Japanese encephalitis, the systematics of shearwaters, ducks and on avian anatomy.

Kuroda was the son of Japanese ornithologist Nagamichi Kuroda. He studied at Gakushuin High School and Tokyo University before receiving his doctorate from Hokkaido University where he worked on the systematics of shearwaters under Toru Uchida. He worked briefly with the US Army 406th Medical General Laboratory, collaborating with Dr. Oliver L. Austin. He then moved to the Yamashina Institute of Ornithology where he worked for the rest of his life. He took a special interest in the seabirds. He was an able artist and a violoncello player. He also wrote on avian anatomy, including notes on the pectoral, and cervical muscles.

A fossil species of shearwater Calonectris kurodai was named in his honour.
