= Nagamichi Kuroda =

Japanese ornithologist

- 黒田 長礼
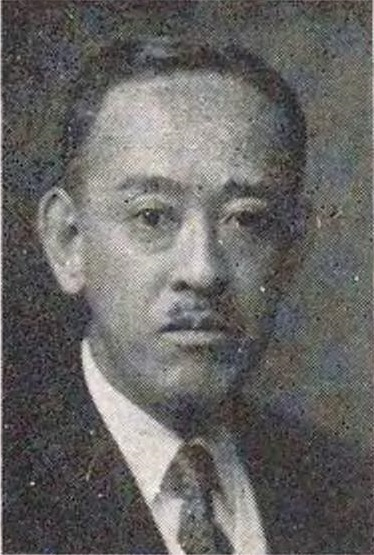
- Born: November 24, 1889; Akasaka, Tokyo, Japan
- Died: April 16, 1978 (aged 88); Akasaka, Tokyo, Japan
- Education: Doctor of Science, Tokyo Imperial University
- Occupation: Ornithologist

Marquis Nagamichi Kuroda (黒田 長礼, Kuroda Nagamichi; 24 November 1889 – 16 April 1978) was a Japanese ornithologist. His works included Ducks of the World (1912), Geese and Swans of the World (1913), Birds of the Island of Java (2 Volumes, 1933–36) and Parrots of the World in Life Colours (1975). He described the crested shelduck in 1917.

He also worked on the distinction between the auks and petrels and the special characteristics of shearwaters that foraged underwater.

== Family ==
- Father: Kuroda Nagashige (1867–1939)
- Mother: Shimazu Kiyoko (1871–1919)
- Wife: Princess Kan'in Shigeko (1897–1991)
- Children (all by Kan’in Shigeko):
  - Kuroda Nagahisa (1916–2009)
  - Masako married Maeda Toshitatsu (1908–1989)
  - Mitsuko married Yamauchi Toyoaki (1912–2003)
  - Shizuko married Mitsuo Mansho (1927–2018)

== List of books available in English ==
- Birds of the Island of Java (1933)
- Passeres (1933)

A bibliography of the duck tribe, Anatidae, mostly from 1926 to 1940, exclusive of that of Dr. Phillips's work (1942)
