= Canary Islands robin =

- E. s. superbus in Tenerife

Scientific classification
- Kingdom: Animalia
- Phylum: Chordata
- Class: Aves
- Order: Passeriformes
- Family: Muscicapidae
- Genus: Erithacus
- Species: E. superbus

Binomial name
- Erithacus superbus (Koenig, 1889)
- Range of E. superbus

Species of bird

The Canary Islands robin (Erithacus superbus) is a small passerine in the Old World flycatcher family. It is endemic to Gran Canaria and Tenerife in the Canary Islands. It is a sedentary species, and there are two known subspecies, one in Gran Canaria and one in Tenerife.

== Etymology ==
The generic epithet Erithacus comes from the Greek erithakos, which referred to an unknown bird that may have been a robin. The specific epithet superbus is Latin for superb, magnificent, or splendid. The subspecific epithet marionae, for the Gran Canaria subspecies, is the latinized version of the name Marion. This name was given in honor of Mrs. Marion Steinbüchel, a German microbiologist who assisted the researchers that identified E. s. marionae during sampling in 2003.

== Taxonomy ==
E. s. marionae, Gran Canaria.

The Canary Islands robin was first described by Alexander Koenig in Journal für Ornithologie in 1889. He gave it the binomial name Erithacus superbus, and the common name "Brilliant-Rothkehlchen" (Brilliant Robin). (Note: While the modern German spelling for the word 'robin' is 'rotkehlchen' the spelling before the German Orthographic Conference of 1901 was 'rothkehlchen.')

Shortly after Koenig's description of the robin as a full species, it was downgraded to subspecies status by most taxonomists, such as Ernst Hartert, and this classification remained until 2026. Increasing evidence in the 21st century, such as a 2001 article, suggested elevating E. r. superbus to species status. The Gran Canaria subspecies, E. r. marionae, was first mentioned in a 2003 paper by Christian Deitzen, Hans-Hinrich Witt, and Michael Wink (though an earlier draft listed the name as E. [r.] canariae). However, due to the absence of a name-bearing type for the subspecies, the taxon was not valid per ICZN requirements. A 2015 paper, also by Christian Deitzen and Michael Wink and with the addition of J. Pieter Michels, fixed the error and became the formal description of E. r. marionae.

A 2022 study suggested splitting E. rubecula (the European robin) into three full species: E. rubecula, E. superbus (Tenerife robin), and E. marionae (Gran Canaria robin). This was based on phylogenetic analyses of mtDNA, combined with morphological and vocal analysis. Additionally, the researchers concluded that E. marionae likely colonized the islands around 2.95 million years ago, that E. superbus did so 2.17 million years ago, and that the E. rubecula robins on the other Canary Islands colonized them 0.75 million years ago.

The Canary Islands robin was officially introduced by AviList in 2026. The name E. superbus was chosen, and the Tenerife and Gran Canaria robins were listed as subspecies. AviList noted that, despite mtDNA data suggesting that the two subspecies are polyphyletic, "the magnitude of vocal differences is more consistent with subspecific differentiation," and that more genomic data and research on vocalizations within E. superbus and E. rubecula will be needed to resolve the inconsistencies present in the species currently.

The Canary Islands robin is polytypic, and there are two accepted subspecies:

- E. s. superbus (Koenig, 1889): the nominate subspecies, found only in Tenerife.
- E. s. marionae (Dietzen C, Michels JP, Wink M, 2015): found only in Gran Canaria. Extremely similar to the nominate subspecies, with slightly more rounded wingtips and on average shorter primaries and body length.

The only surviving syntype for the nominate subspecies, E. s. superbus, was collected in Icod el Alto, Tenerife. The type specimen for E. s. marionae was collected by Rudolf von Thanner in 1909 or 1910 in Moya, Gran Canaria.

== Description ==
E. s. marionae in Gran Canaria.

The Canary Islands robin looks similar to the European robin, to which it is closely related, and both species can be found in the Canary Islands. The Canary Islands robin differs in having a deeper orange-red face, throat, and breast, whiter belly and vent, white eyering, and more extensive grey around the face, throat, and breast. The song of this species also differs from that of the European robin, and between the two subspecies of Canary Islands robin.

== Distribution and habitat ==
E. s. superbus in a tree, Tenerife.

The Canary Islands robin is endemic to two islands in the Canary Islands, Gran Canaria and Tenerife. As the species was formerly considered conspecific with the European robin, its preferred habitat in contrast with the European robin's is not yet fully understood. However, it is likely that it occupies similar habitat to the European robin, such as forest edge and undergrowth in coniferous and deciduous woodland, thickets along waterways, gardens, parks, and orchards. In Tenerife, Canary Islands robins are known from laurel forests, Canary tree heath, tree lucerne, and overlap areas between Canary tree heath and Canary pine. Also on Tenerife, this species is restricted to higher elevation montane forests, even forgoing otherwise suitable lower-elevation habitat.

== Behavior and ecology ==
E. s. marionae in Gran Canaria.

Canary Islands robins likely have similar feeding habits to their mainland counterparts, the European robin. European robins are known to engage in flycatching - where they find a suitable open or semiopen perch and fly to the ground to catch prey before returning to their perch - and to pursue prey on foot through vegetation. The diet of the Canary Islands robin is also likely similar to that of the European robin, consisting of seeds, fruits, invertebrates, carrion, bird food, and small vertebrates.

This species breeds from mid-March to June, with a territory size of 0.9–1.5 ha (2.2–3.7 acres).
