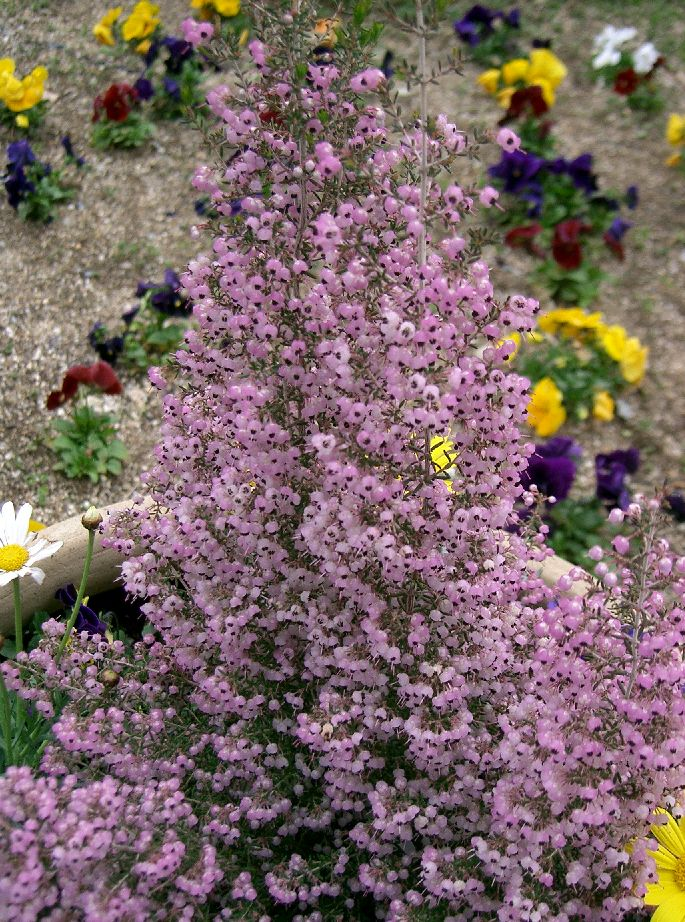

Scientific classification
- Kingdom: Plantae
- Clade: Tracheophytes
- Clade: Angiosperms
- Clade: Eudicots
- Clade: Asterids
- Order: Ericales
- Family: Ericaceae
- Genus: Erica
- Species: E. canaliculata

Binomial name
- Erica canaliculata Andrews

= Erica canaliculata =

Species of flowering plant

Erica canaliculata, the channelled heath or hairy grey heather, is a South African species of flowering plant in the family Ericaceae.

It is an erect evergreen shrub, sometimes described as a tree heath (a term also applied to E. arborea and E. lusitanica). It grows to 2 metres (6 1/2 feet), with tiny dark green leaves and large sprays of pink or white flowers with prominent brown anthers in winter and spring.

The Latin specific epithet canaliculata means "with channeled or grooved leaves".

The species is native to the East and West Capes of South Africa and is naturalised in South Australia. Not fully hardy, in frost-prone areas it requires some protection. It has gained the Royal Horticultural Society's Award of Garden Merit.
