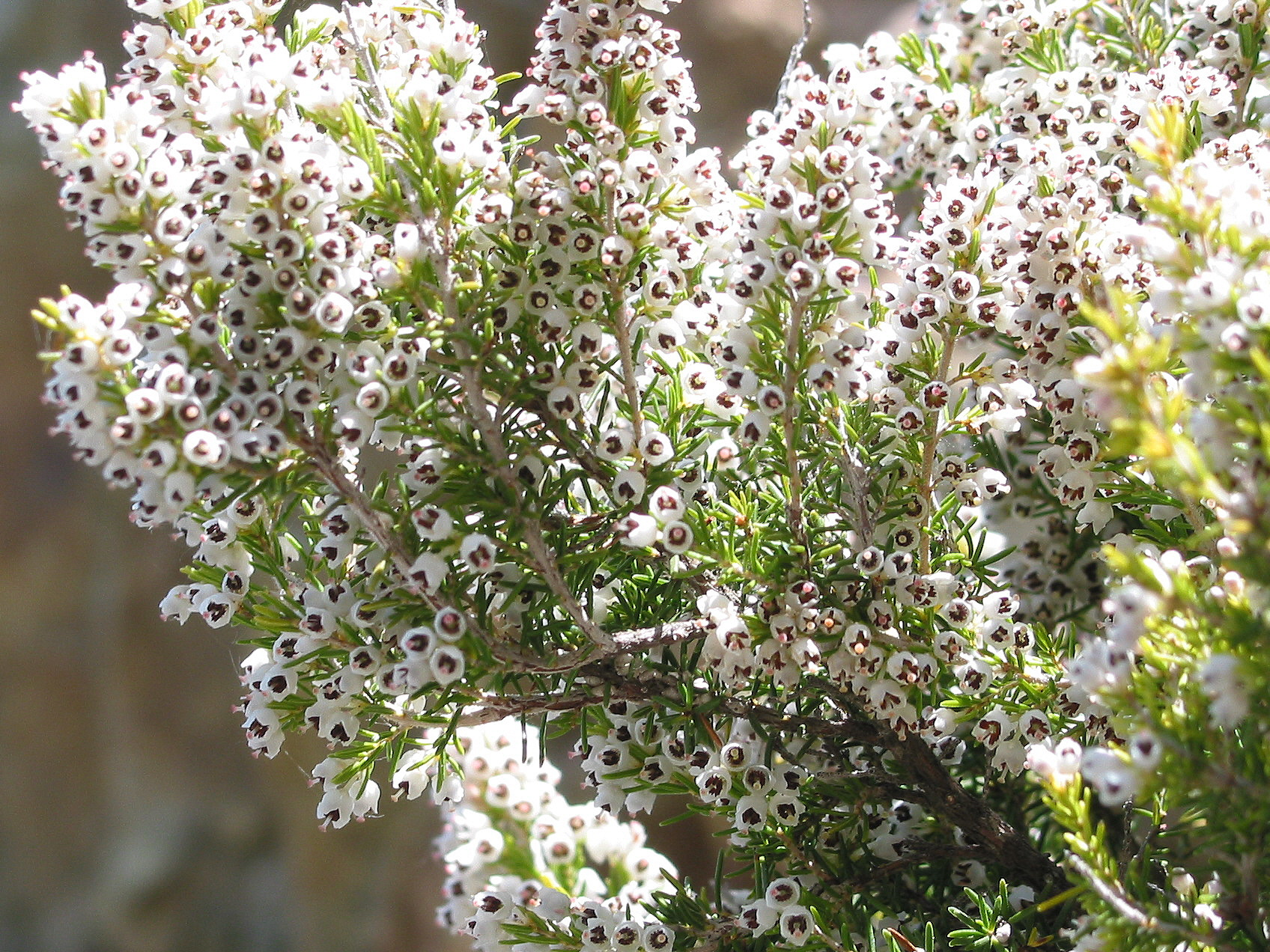

Conservation status
- Least Concern (IUCN 3.1)

Scientific classification
- Kingdom: Plantae
- Clade: Tracheophytes
- Clade: Angiosperms
- Clade: Eudicots
- Clade: Asterids
- Order: Ericales
- Family: Ericaceae
- Genus: Erica
- Species: E. arborea

Binomial name
- Erica arborea L.
- Distribution map

= Erica arborea =

Species of flowering plant

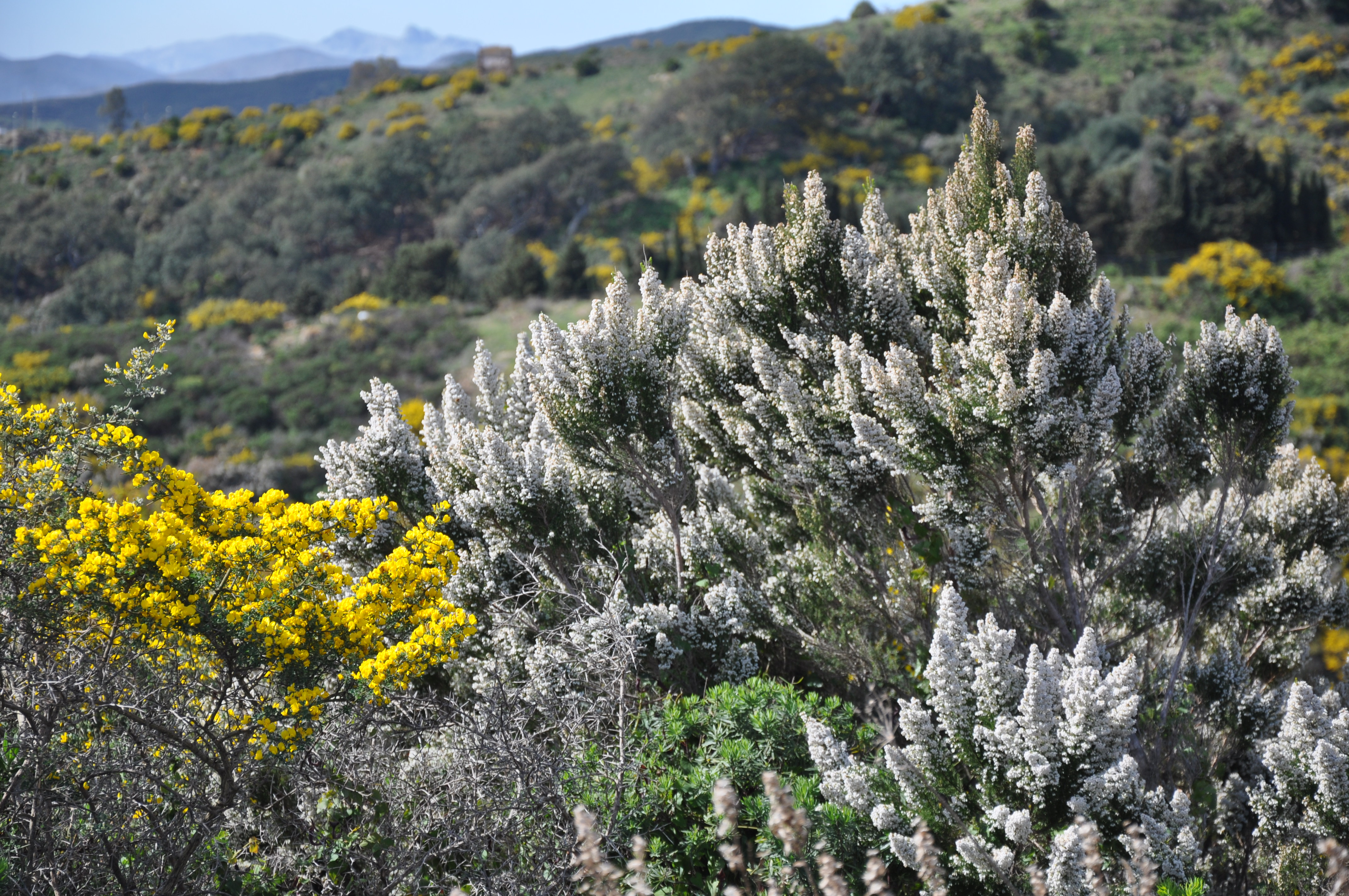
Erica arborea, Northwest Africa

Erica arborea, the tree heath or tree heather, is a species of flowering plant (angiosperms) in the heather family Ericaceae, native to the Mediterranean Basin and Ethiopia, Kenya and Tanzania in East Africa. It is also cultivated as an ornamental.

The wood, known as briar root (French: bruyère, Catalan: bruc, Portuguese: betouro, Spanish: brezo), is extremely hard and heat-resistant, and is used for making smoking pipes. Leaf fossils attributed to this species were described for the Mio-Pleistocene deposit of São Jorge in Madeira Island.

== Description ==
Erica arborea is an upright evergreen shrub or small tree with a typical height in the wild of some 7 m (23 ft), especially in Africa, but more typically 1–4 m (3–13 ft) in gardens. It bears dark green needle-like leaves and numerous small honey-scented bell-shaped white flowers. It is a calcifuge, preferring acid soil in an open sunny situation.

== Distribution and habitat ==
The heather has a disjunct distribution, including both sides of the Mediterranean basin, the western Caucasus, tropical eastern African mountains, and the Arabian Peninsula.

Throughout the Mediterranean Basin, its distribution is not continuous, extending from the Atlantic coasts of Portugal and Spain to the coast of the Black Sea in Turkey and Georgia. The heather occurs within the Mediterranean maquis shrublands in semi-arid habitats but can also be found in forest undergrowth up to 1400 m a.s.l. in fresher and more humid environments. It prefers acidic or acidified soils derived from siliceous substrates.

It is also present in an isolated population in the Tibesti Mountains (Chad) in the Sahara, where it occurs at the top of upper montane desert steppe vegetation between 2500 and 3000 m a.s.l. In eastern Africa, it is normally referred to as giant heather. It occurs in the Ethiopian Highlands, in the highest mountains along the East African Rift, from southern Uganda to northern Malawi. It is also present in the Sarawat Mountains in the southwestern Arabian Peninsula, including Yemen and Saudi Arabia. In Africa and the Arabian Peninsula, the heather is a constituent of the tropical alpine vegetation, dominating the shrubland above the treeline in mountain areas at altitudes between 3,000 and 4,000 m.

It was previously considered to occur in Macaronesia, but the similar species found there is now treated as a separate species, Erica canariensis.

Naturalised populations occur Great Britain, and in south-eastern Australia and New Zealand, where tree heath is seen as a potential environmental weed.

== Cultivars ==
Erica arborea was being cultivated as early as 1658. Several cultivars and hybrids have been developed for garden use, of which the following have gained the Royal Horticultural Society's Award of Garden Merit:

- E. arborea 'Estrella Gold' (gold-tipped leaves)
- E. arborea var. alpina
- E. arborea var. alpina f. aureifolia 'Albert's Gold' (gold-leaved)
- E. × veitchii 'Gold Tips' (E. arborea × E. lusitanica)

Other tall growing heaths, including the Portugal heath (Erica lusitanica) and channel heath (Erica canaliculata) may also sometimes be called tree heath.

== Uses ==
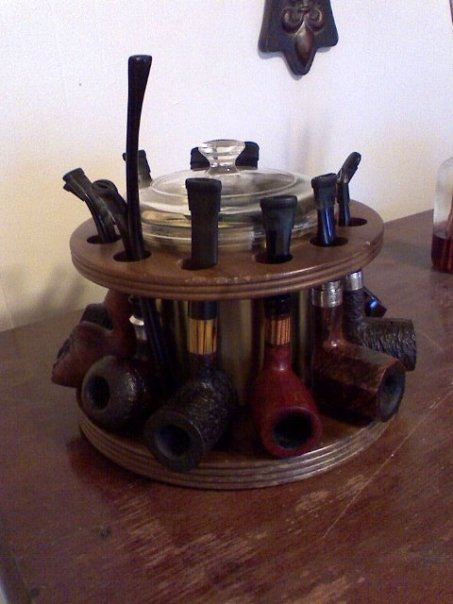
Briar pipes on a circular pipe rack

The wood, known as briar root, is extremely hard, dense and heat-resistant, and is primarily used for making smoking pipes, as it does not affect the aroma of tobacco. The football-sized tubers are harvested at the age of 30 to 60 years. They are cooked for several hours, then dried for several months before they are further processed.

The wood is also used for making jewellery, fountain pens and knife handles.

== See also ==
- Mediterranean forests, woodlands, and scrub
