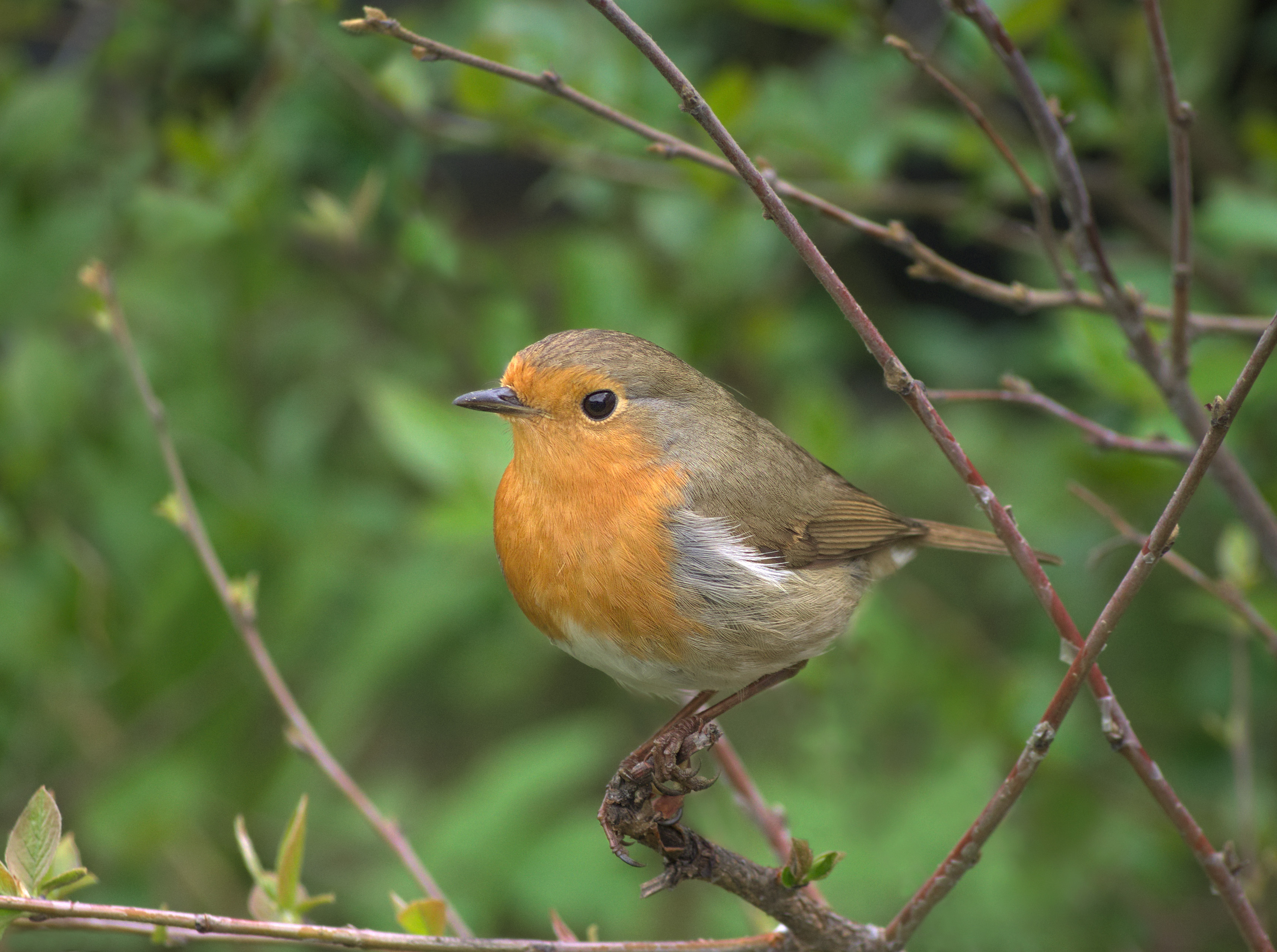
- European robin (Erithacus rubecula)

Scientific classification
- Kingdom: Animalia
- Phylum: Chordata
- Class: Aves
- Order: Passeriformes
- Family: Muscicapidae
- Genus: Erithacus; Cuvier, 1800

Species
- See text

= Erithacus =

Erithacus Temporal range: Miocene–Recent

Genus of bird

Erithacus (Latin: erithacus; Ancient Greek: ἐρίθακος, romanized: eríthakos, lit. 'robin' (erithacos)) is a genus of passerine bird that contains two extant species, the European robin (Erithacus rubecula) and the Canary Islands robin (Erithacus superbus). The Japanese robin and Ryukyu robin were also placed in this genus (as Erithacus akahige and E. komadori), but were moved to the genus Larvivora in 2006.

== Fossil species ==
- †Erithacus horusitskyi Kessler & Hir, 2012 (Miocene of Hungary)
- †Erithacus minor Kessler, 2013 (Pliocene of Hungary)
