= Erithacus minor =

Erithacus minor Temporal range: Pliocene

Scientific classification
- Kingdom: Animalia
- Phylum: Chordata
- Class: Aves
- Order: Passeriformes
- Family: Muscicapidae
- Genus: Erithacus
- Species: †E. minor

Binomial name
- †Erithacus minor Kessler, 2013

Extinct species of bird

Erithacus minor is an extinct species of Erithacus that inhabited Hungary during the Neogene period.

== Etymology ==
The specific epithet "minor" is derived from its size, as it is smaller than other species in the genus.
