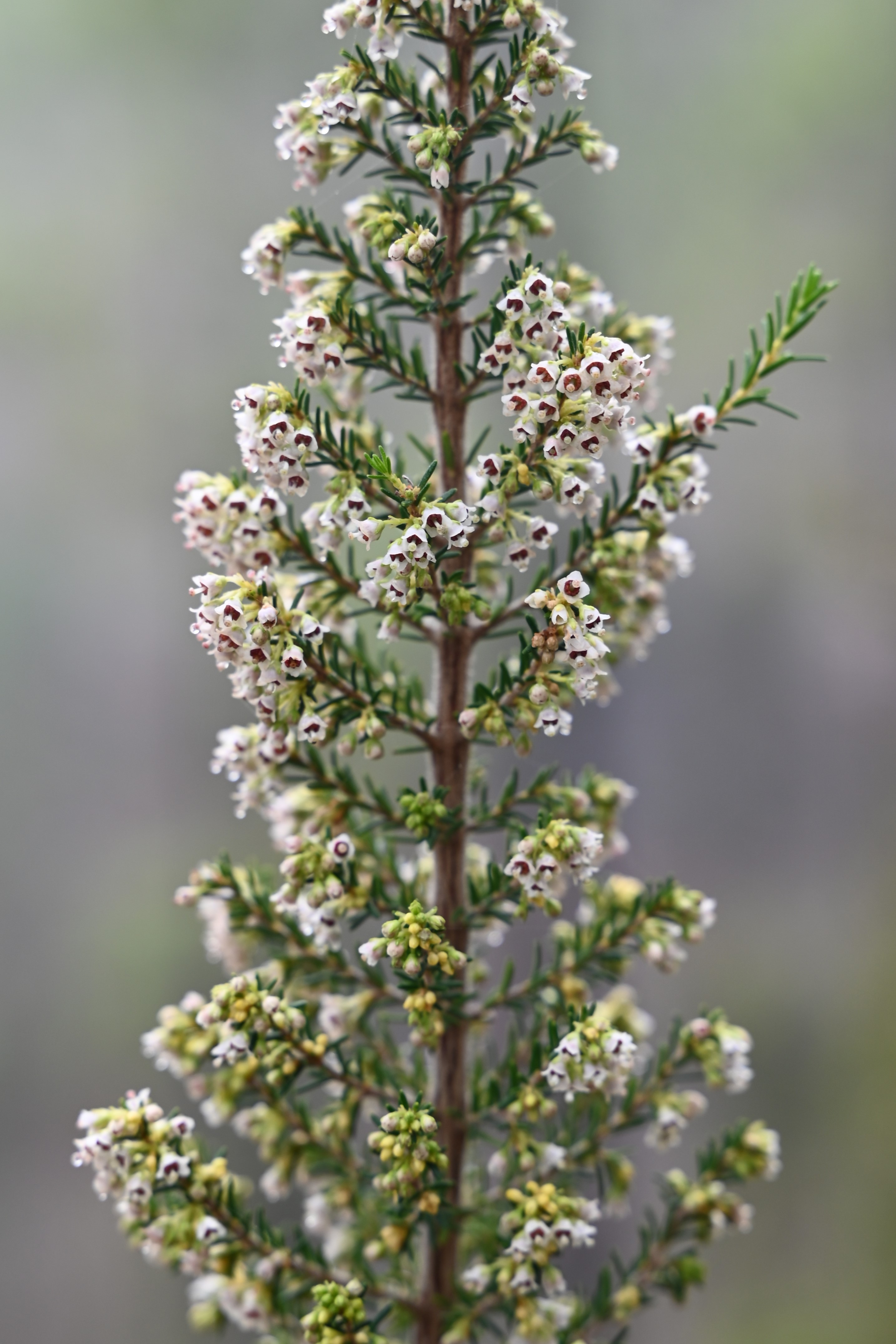

Scientific classification
- Kingdom: Plantae
- Clade: Tracheophytes
- Clade: Angiosperms
- Clade: Eudicots
- Clade: Asterids
- Order: Ericales
- Family: Ericaceae
- Genus: Erica
- Species: E. canariensis

Binomial name
- Erica canariensis Rivas Mart., Martín Osorio & Wildpret

= Erica canariensis =

Species of plant

Erica canariensis is a species of flowering plant in the family Ericaceae, native to Madeira and the Canary Islands. Erica canariensis was distinguished from Erica arborea by Salvador Rivas-Martínez and co-authors in 2011. The distinction is not accepted by all sources.

== Description ==
Erica canariensis resembles E. arborea. Its differences include being an upright tree 6 to 9 m tall with a trunk up to 2 m in diameter. Young branches are densely covered with mainly simple hairs of variable lengths. The leaves are more-or-less flat, only slightly inrolled (revolute). The inflorescences have an elongated pyramidal shape. The corolla is up to 5 mm long, shortly bell-shaped. Its white bell-shaped flowers distinguish it from the other species found in the Canaries, Erica platycodon.

== Taxonomy ==
Erica canariensis was first described in 2011, when it was distinguished from E. arborea by Salvador Rivas Martínez and co-authors. As of October 2025, the distinction is accepted by Plants of the World Online, but not by other taxonomic databases, such as World Flora Online, which treats it as a synonym of E. arborea.

== Distribution and habitat ==
Erica canariensis is native to Madeira and the Canary Islands, where it is found in shady forests and thickets. The holotype was found on the north side of Teide in Tenerife at an altitude of around 2,100 m.

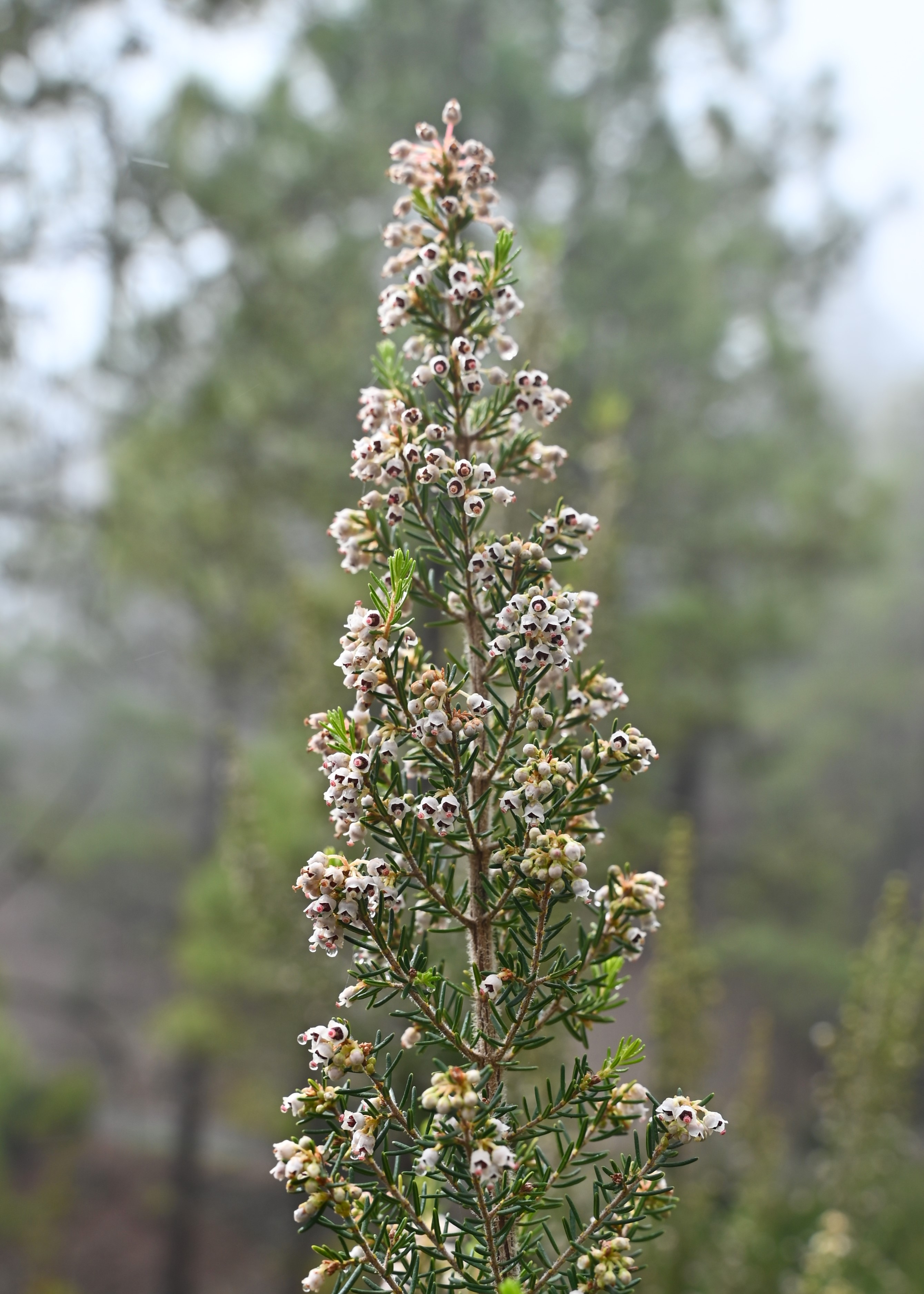
Elongated pyramidal inflorescence

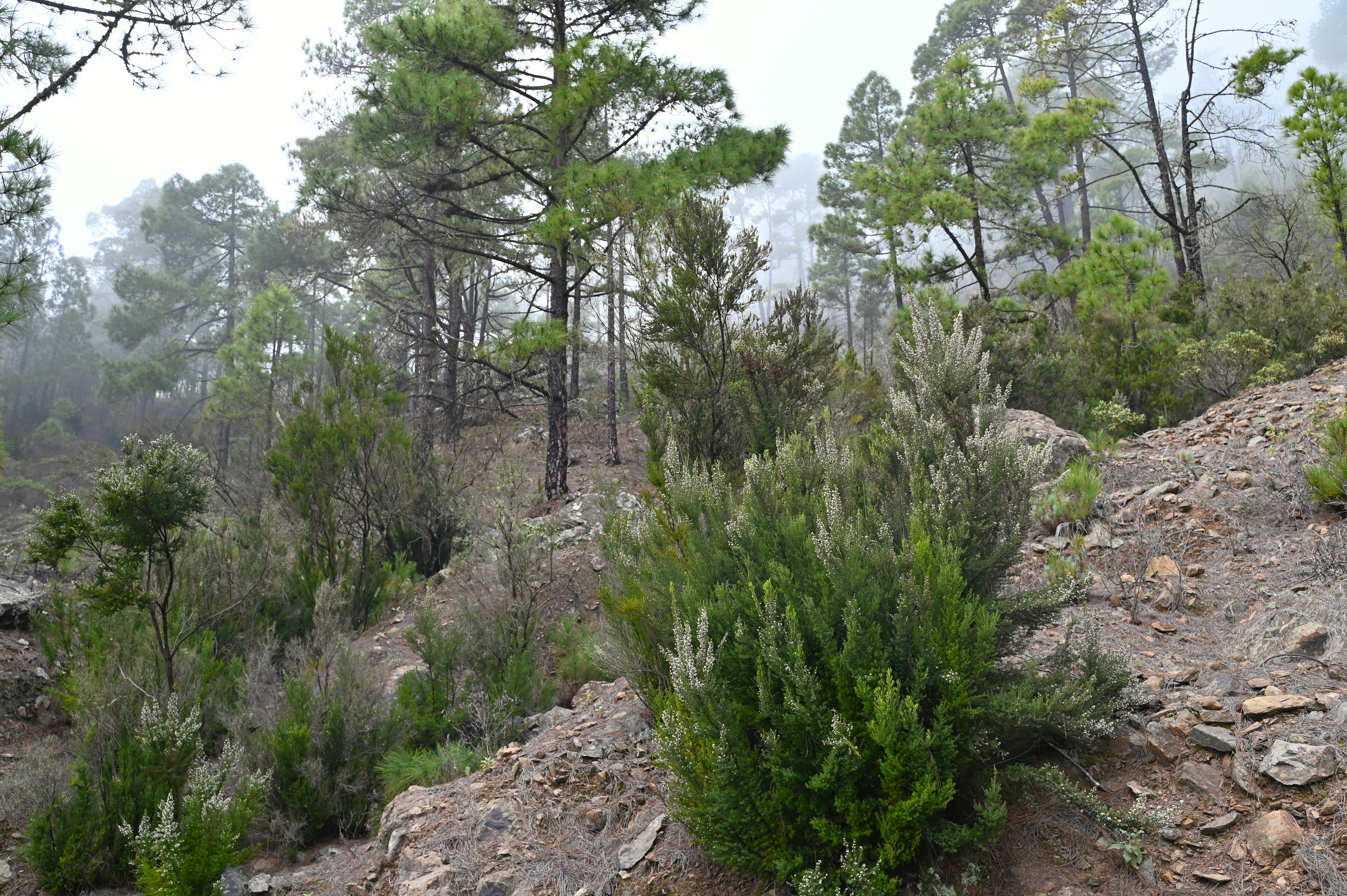
As a shrub in pine forest habitat

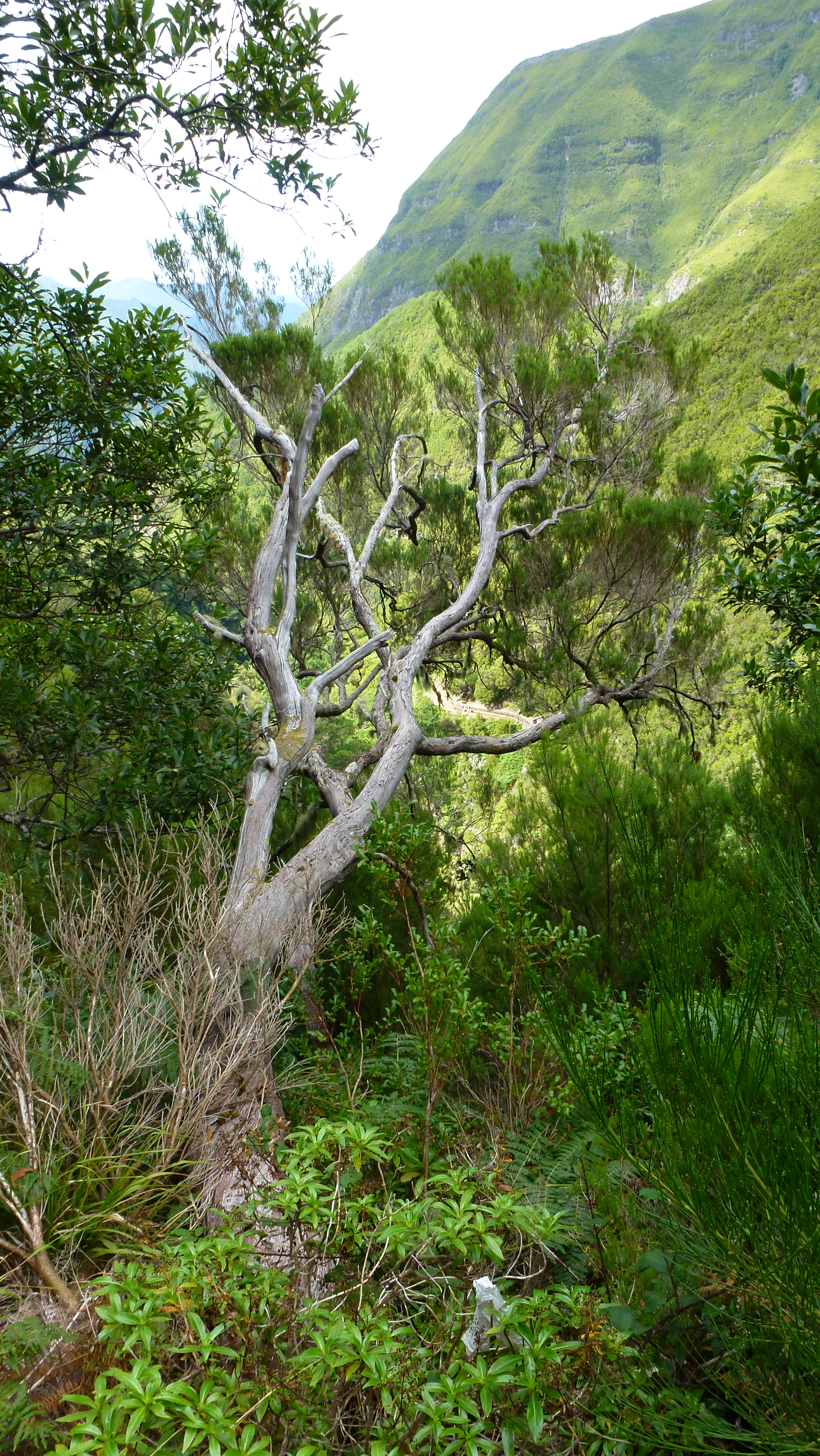
As a tree in Madeira
