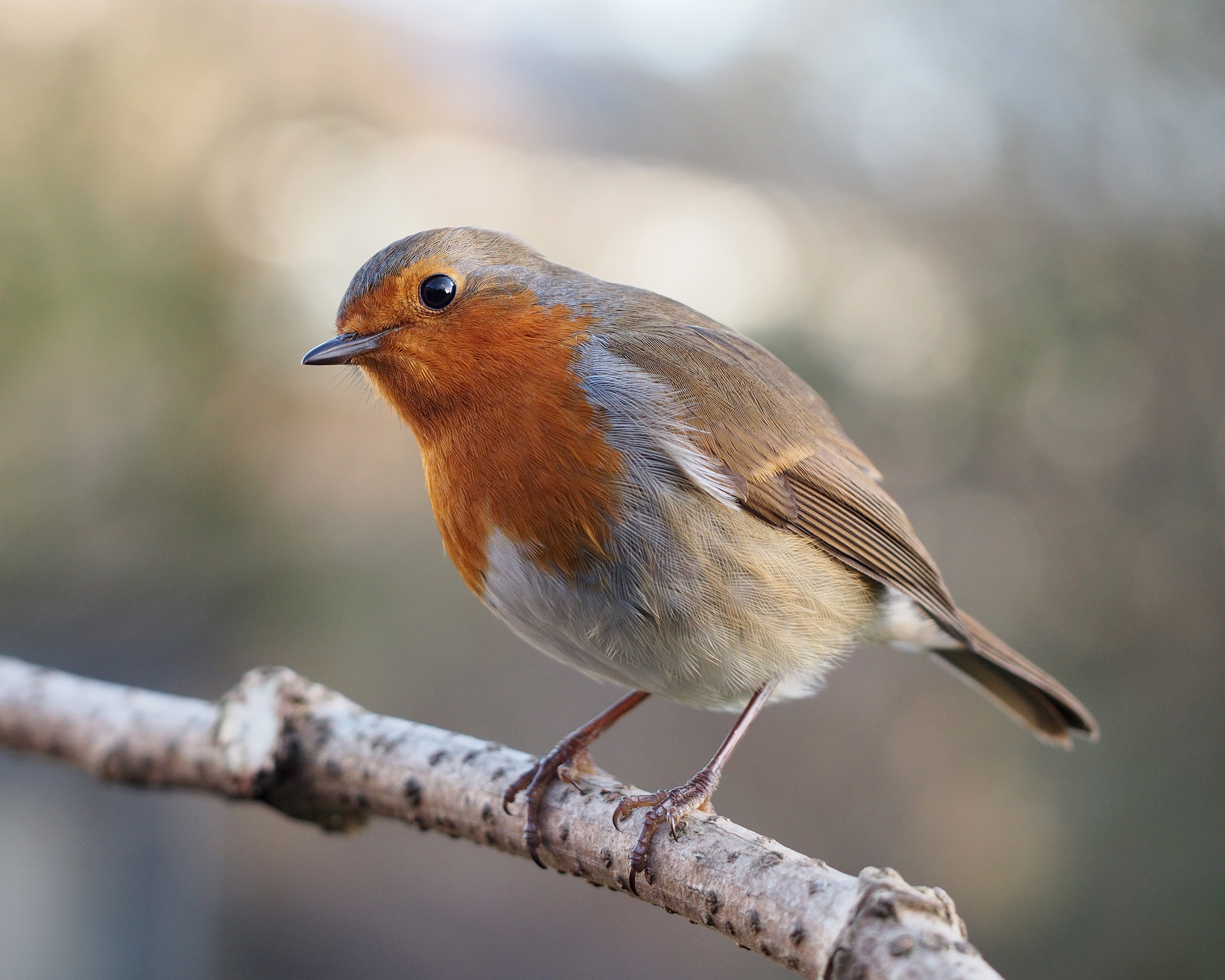

Conservation status
- Least Concern (IUCN 3.1)

Scientific classification
- Kingdom: Animalia
- Phylum: Chordata
- Class: Aves
- Order: Passeriformes
- Family: Muscicapidae
- Genus: Erithacus
- Species: E. rubecula

Binomial name
- Erithacus rubecula (Linnaeus, 1758)

Subspecies
- 7–10, see text.
- Range of E. rubecula Breeding Resident Non-breeding Introduced and probably extinct

Synonyms
- Erithacus dandalus subsp. sardus Kleinschmidt, 1906; Erithacus rubecula subsp. armoricanus Lebeurier & Rapine, 1936; Erithacus rubecula subsp. sardus Kleinschmidt, 1906; Motacilla rubecula Linnaeus, 1758

Audio
- Song recorded in Gran Canaria

= European robin =

Species of bird

The European robin (Erithacus rubecula), known simply as the robin or robin redbreast in the British Isles, is a small insectivorous passerine bird belonging to the Old World flycatcher family Muscicapidae. It is found across Europe, as far east as Western Siberia, and as far south as North Africa. It is sedentary in the west and south of its range, and migratory in the north and east of its range where winters are harsher.

It is 12.5–14.0 cm (4.9–5.5 in) in length. The male and female are identical in plumage, with an orange-toned red breast and face lined with grey, brown upper-parts and a whitish belly. Juveniles are distinct, being freckled brown all over and lacking the red breast. First-winter immatures resemble the adults, except they have more obvious yellow-brown tips to the wing covert feathers, which are inconspicuous or absent in adults.

== Etymology ==
The distinctive orange breast of both sexes contributed to the European robin's original name of "redbreast". The word orange did not become a recognised colour name in English until the 16th century, by which time the fruit of the same name had been introduced. Other names for the bird in different languages also refer to its distinctive colouring: Czech červenka, Dutch roodborstje, French rouge-gorge, Swedish rödhake, German Rotkehlchen, Italian pettirosso, Spanish petirrojo, Hungarian vörösbegy, and Portuguese pisco-de-peito-ruivo.

In the 15th century, when it became popular to give human names to familiar species, the bird came to be known as robin redbreast, which was eventually shortened to robin. As a given name, Robin is originally a diminutive of the name Robert. The term robin is also applied to some birds in other families with red or orange breasts. These include the American robin (Turdus migratorius, a thrush) and the Australasian robins of the family Petroicidae, the relationships of which are unclear.

Other older English names for the bird include ruddock and robinet. In American literature of the late 19th century, this robin was often referred to as the English robin.

== Taxonomy and systematics ==
The European robin was described by Carl Linnaeus in 1758 in the 10th edition of his Systema Naturae under the binomial name Motacilla rubecula. Its specific epithet rubecula is a diminutive derived from the Latin ruber, meaning 'red'. The genus Erithacus was described by French naturalist Georges Cuvier in 1800, giving the bird its current binomial name E. rubecula. The genus name Erithacus is from Ancient Greek and refers to an unknown bird, now usually identified as robin.

The genus Erithacus was formerly classified as a member of the thrush family (Turdidae) but is now known to belong to the Old World flycatcher family Muscicapidae. The genus formerly included the Japanese robin and the Ryukyu robin, but these east Asian species were shown in molecular phylogenetic studies to be more similar to a group of other Asian species than to the European robin; in a reorganisation of the genera, the Japanese and the Ryukyu robins were moved to the resurrected genus Larvivora leaving the European robin as the sole extant member of Erithacus. A 2010 phylogenetic analysis placed Erithacus in a subfamily (Cossyphinae Vigors, 1825, syn. Erithacinae G. R. Gray, 1846) which otherwise contained only African species, but its exact position with respect to the other species in that subfamily was not resolved. More detailed analysis in 2023 confirmed it to be the sole European member of this tropical African subfamily, in which it is in a basal position.

=== Subspecies ===
Within their extensive Eurasian range, robins exhibit some variation, though not enough to constitute distinct populations that could be classified as subspecies. Robin subspecies are mainly distinguished by forming resident populations on islands and in mountainous areas. The robin found in the British Isles and much of western Europe, Erithacus rubecula melophilus, occurs as a vagrant in adjacent regions. E. r. witherbyi from northwest Africa, Corsica, and Sardinia closely resembles E. r. melophilus but has shorter wings. The northeasternmost birds, large and fairly washed-out in colour, are E. r. tataricus. In the southeast of its range, E. r. valens of the Crimean Peninsula, E. r. caucasicus of the Caucasus and northern Transcaucasia, and E. r. hyrcanus southeastwards into Iran are generally accepted as significantly distinct.

On Madeira and the Azores, the local population has been described as E. r. microrhynchos, and although not distinct in morphology, its isolation seems to suggest the subspecies is valid (but see below).

==== Canary Islands robins ====
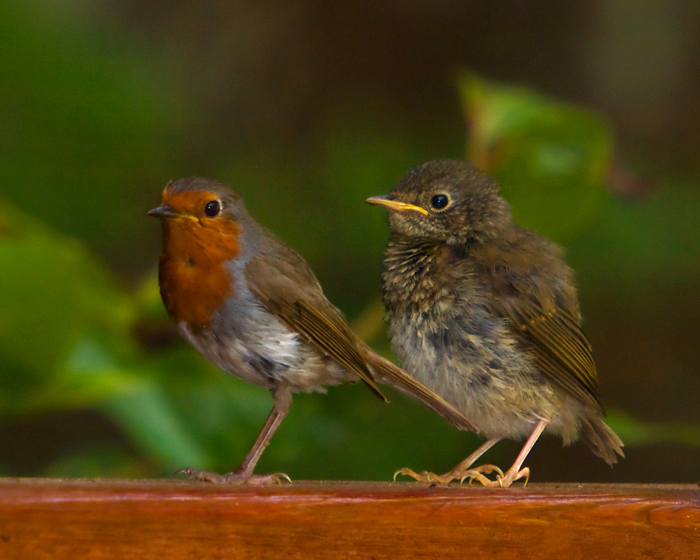
Adult and juvenile Gran Canaria robins

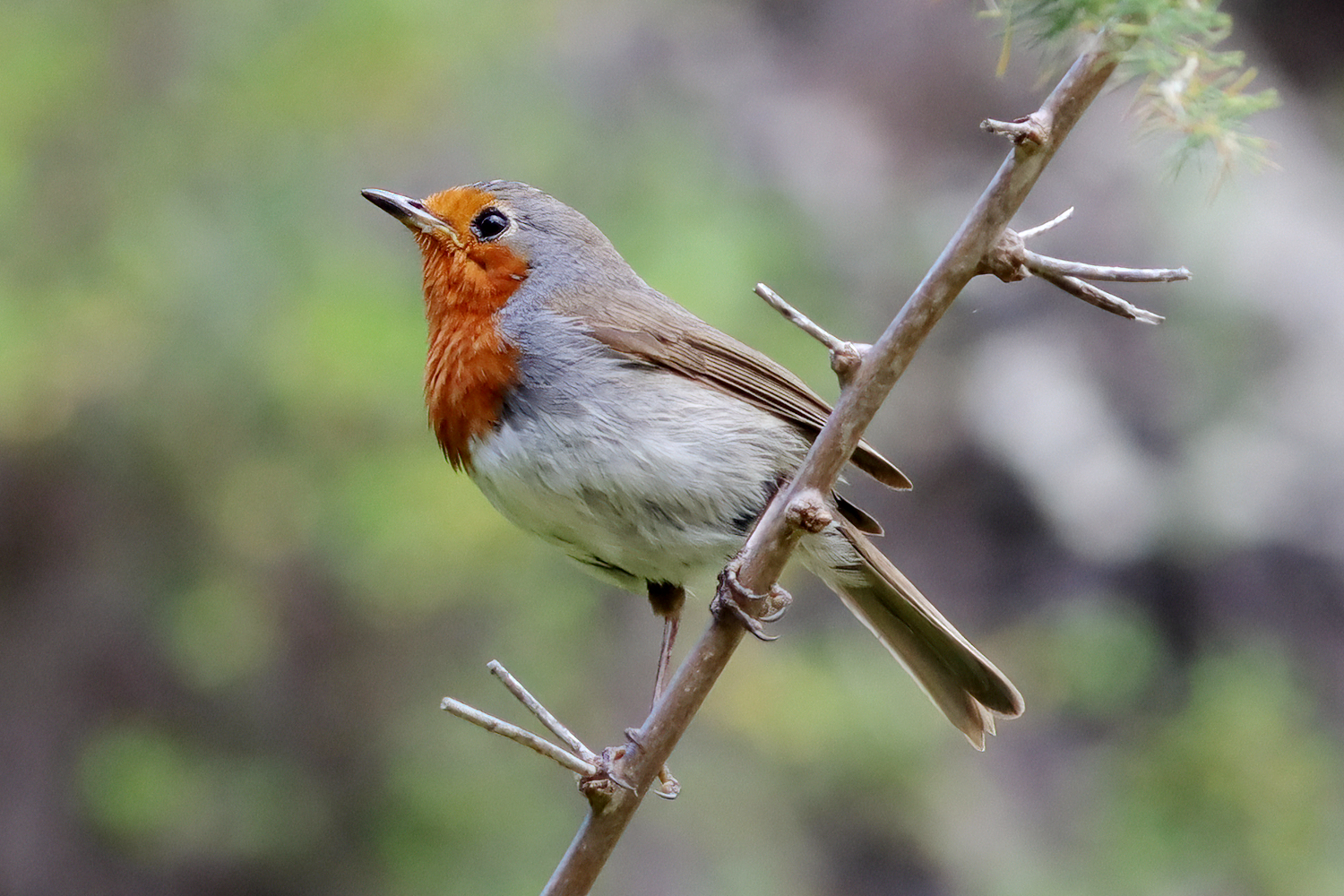
Tenerife robin Erithacus rubecula superbus, Los Silos, Tenerife

The most distinctive birds are found in Gran Canaria (E. r. marionae) and Tenerife (E. r. superbus), which may be considered two distinct species or at least two different subspecies. They are readily distinguished by a white eye-ring, an intensely coloured breast, a grey line that separates the orange-red from the brown colouration, and the belly is entirely white.

Cytochrome b sequence data and vocalisations indicate that the Gran Canaria/Tenerife robins are indeed very distinct and probably derived from colonisation by mainland birds some 2 million years ago. (Note: Although Dietzen et al. (2003) conclude that both the Tenerife and Gran Canaria populations are independently derived from mainland populations and should constitute two species or both be placed in E. rubecula as subspecies, their data does not allow for a definite conclusion. The alternative explanation, that the robins of Tenerife were already distinct from those of Gran Canaria when the island was colonised, has not been explored, and the proposed model relies only on probabilistic inference. Similarly, the molecular dating appears precise, but it assumes a molecular clock that may or may not be accurate. Further, the assumption that the ancestor of all robins was similar in colour to superbus and not the continental birds is, being inferred from their model of colonisation, entirely conjectural.)

In 2003, Christian Dietzen, Hans-Hinrich Witt and Michael Wink published a study in Avian Science entitled "The phylogeographic differentiation of the European robin Erithacus rubecula on the Canary Islands revealed by mitochondrial DNA sequence data and morphometrics: evidence for a new robin taxon on Gran Canaria?". In it, they concluded that the robins on Gran Canaria diverged genetically from their European relatives as far back as 2.3 million years, while the Tenerife ones took another half a million years to make this leap, 1.8 million years ago. The most likely reason is that this bird colonised the Canary Islands in a different way, arriving at the oldest island first (Gran Canaria) and then moving on to the neighbouring island (Tenerife).

A thorough comparison between E. r. marionae and E. r. superbus is pending to confirm that the first one is effectively a different subspecies. Initial results suggest that birds from Gran Canaria have wings about 10% shorter than those on Tenerife. The west Canary Islands' populations are younger (Middle Pleistocene) and only beginning to diverge genetically. Robins from the western Canary Islands on El Hierro, La Palma and La Gomera (E. r. microrhynchus) are more similar to the European type subspecies (E. r. rubecula).

Finally, the robins which can be found on Fuerteventura are the European subspecies, which is not surprising as the species does not breed either in this island or on nearby Lanzarote; they are wintering birds or just on passage during their migration between Africa and Europe.

=== Other robins ===
The American robin (Turdus migratorius) is a much larger bird named from its similar colouration to the European robin, but the two birds are not closely related, with the American robin instead belonging to the same genus as the common blackbird (T. merula), a species which occupies much of the same range as the European robin. The similarity between the European and American robins lies largely in the orange chest patch found in both species. This American species was incorrectly shown "feathering its nest" in London in the film Mary Poppins, but it only occurs in the UK as a very rare vagrant.

Some South and Central American Turdus thrushes are also called robins, such as the rufous-collared thrush. The Australian "robin redbreast", more correctly the scarlet robin (Petroica boodang), is more closely related to crows and jays than it is to the European robin. It belongs to the family Petroicidae, whose members are commonly called "Australasian robins". The red-billed leiothrix (Leiothrix lutea) is sometimes named the "Pekin robin" by aviculturalists. Another group of Old World flycatchers, this time from Africa and Asia, is the genus Copsychus; its members are known as magpie-robins, one of which, the Oriental magpie robin (C. saularis), is the national bird of Bangladesh.

== Description ==
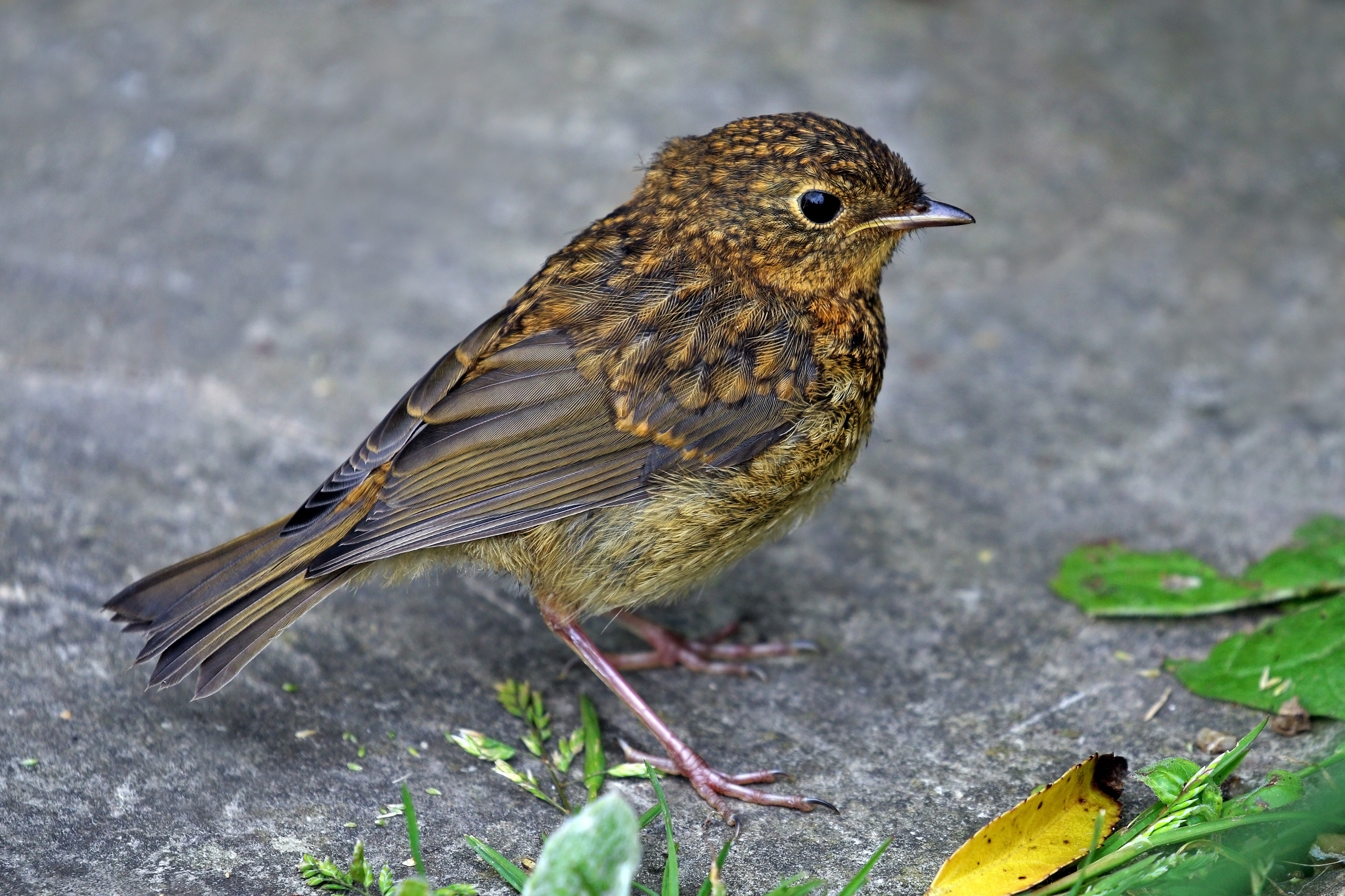
Juvenile, Sussex

The adult European robin is 12.5–14.0 cm (4.9–5.5 in) long and weighs 16–22 g (0.56–0.78 oz), with a wingspan of 20–22 cm (8–8.5 in). The male and female bear similar plumage: an orange breast and face (more strongly coloured in the otherwise similar British subspecies E. r. melophilus), lined by a bluish grey on the sides of the neck and chest. The upperparts are brownish, or olive-tinged in British birds, and the belly whitish, while the legs and feet are brown. The bill and eyes are black. Juveniles are a spotted brown and white in colouration, with patches of orange gradually appearing.

== Distribution and habitat ==
The robin is found in Eurasia, from Western Siberia in the east to Algeria in the south, and on Atlantic islands as far west as the Central Group of the Azores and Madeira. It is a vagrant in Iceland. In the southeast, its range extends to Iran and the Caucasus mountain range. Irish and British robins are largely resident but a small minority, usually females, migrate to southern Europe during the winter, with some going as far as Spain. Scandinavian and Russian robins migrate to Britain and western Europe to escape the harsher winters. These migrants can be recognised by the greyish tone of the upper parts of their bodies and duller orange breast. Continental European robins that migrate during winter prefer spruce woods in northern Europe, in contrast to their preference for parks and gardens in Great Britain.

In southern Iberia, habitat segregation of resident and migrant robins occurs, with resident robins remaining in the same woodlands where they bred.

Attempts to introduce the European robin into Australia and New Zealand in the late part of the 19th century were unsuccessful. Birds were released in the areas around Melbourne, Auckland, Christchurch, Wellington and Dunedin by various local acclimatisation societies, but none of them became established. A similar outcome occurred in North America when birds failed to become established after being released in Long Island, New York in 1852, Oregon in 1889–1892, and the Saanich Peninsula in British Columbia in 1908–1910.

== Behaviour and ecology ==
The robin is diurnal, although it has been reported to hunt insects on moonlit nights or near artificial light. Well known to British and Irish gardeners, the robin is relatively unafraid of people and is drawn to human activities involving digging, such as gardening, in order to look for earthworms and other food that has been freshly turned up. The British and Irish considered robins to be a gardener's friend and would never harm them, partly due to the traditional association of the red colouring of their breasts with the blood of Christ. In continental Europe, however, robins were hunted and killed as were most other small birds. Consequently, they are more wary. Robins also approach large wild animals, such as wild boar, which disturb the ground, to look for any food that might be brought to the surface.

In autumn and winter, robins will supplement their usual diet of terrestrial invertebrates, such as spiders, worms and insects, with berries, fruit and seeds. They will also eat seed mixtures and suet placed on bird-tables, as well as left-overs. The robin is even known to feed on small vertebrates (including fish and lizards) and carrion.

Male robins are highly territorial and will fiercely attack other males and competitors that enter their territory. They have even been known to attack other small birds for no apparent reason. There are recorded instances of robins attacking their own reflection. Territorial disputes sometimes lead to fatalities, accounting for up to 10% of adult robin deaths in some areas.

Because of high mortality in the first year of life, a robin has an average life expectancy of 1.1 years; however, once past its first year, life expectancy increases. One robin has been recorded as reaching 19 years of age. A spell of very low temperatures in winter can, however, result in higher mortality rates. The species is parasitised by the moorhen flea (Dasypsyllus gallinulae) and the acanthocephalan Apororhynchus silesiacus.

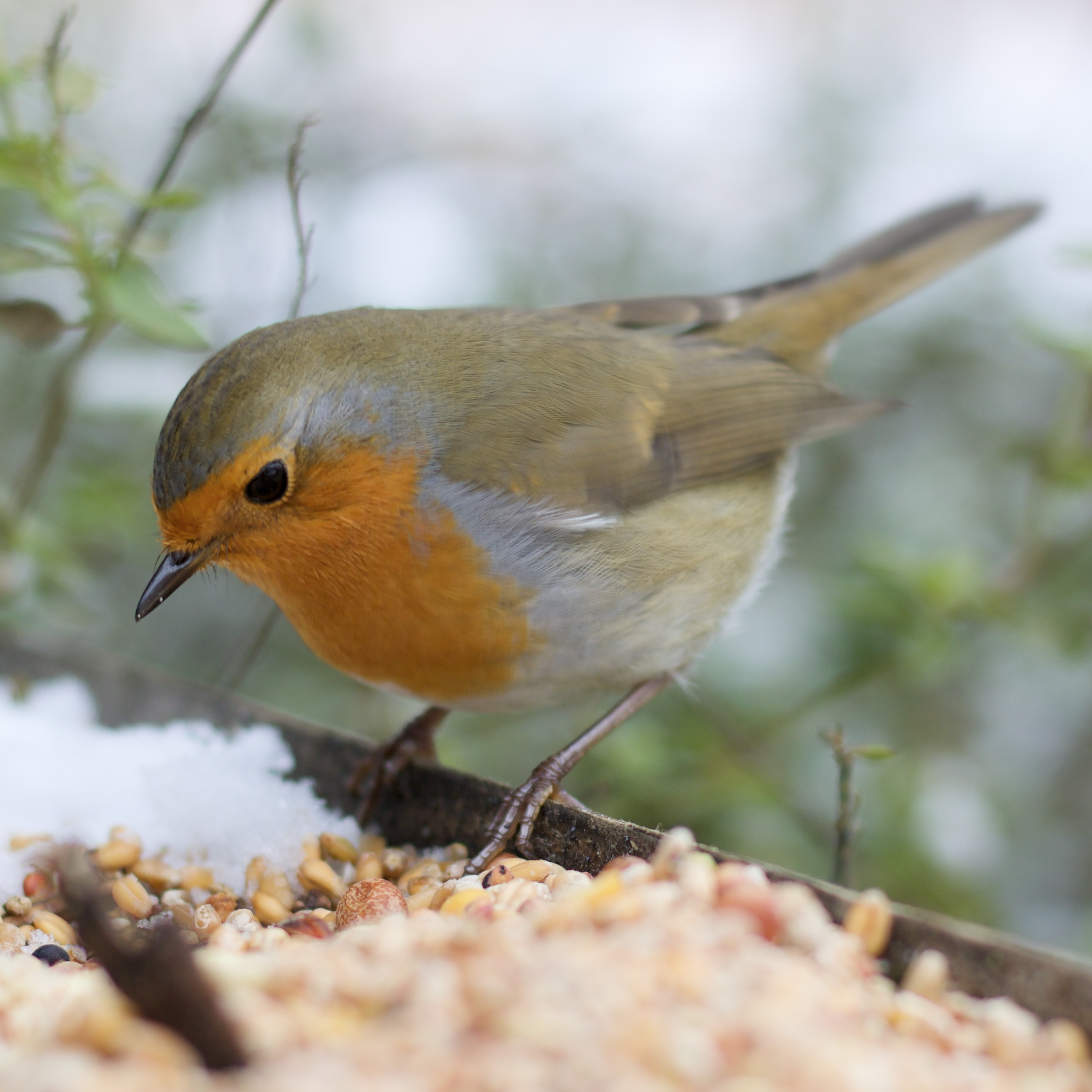
Robin eating seeds in France

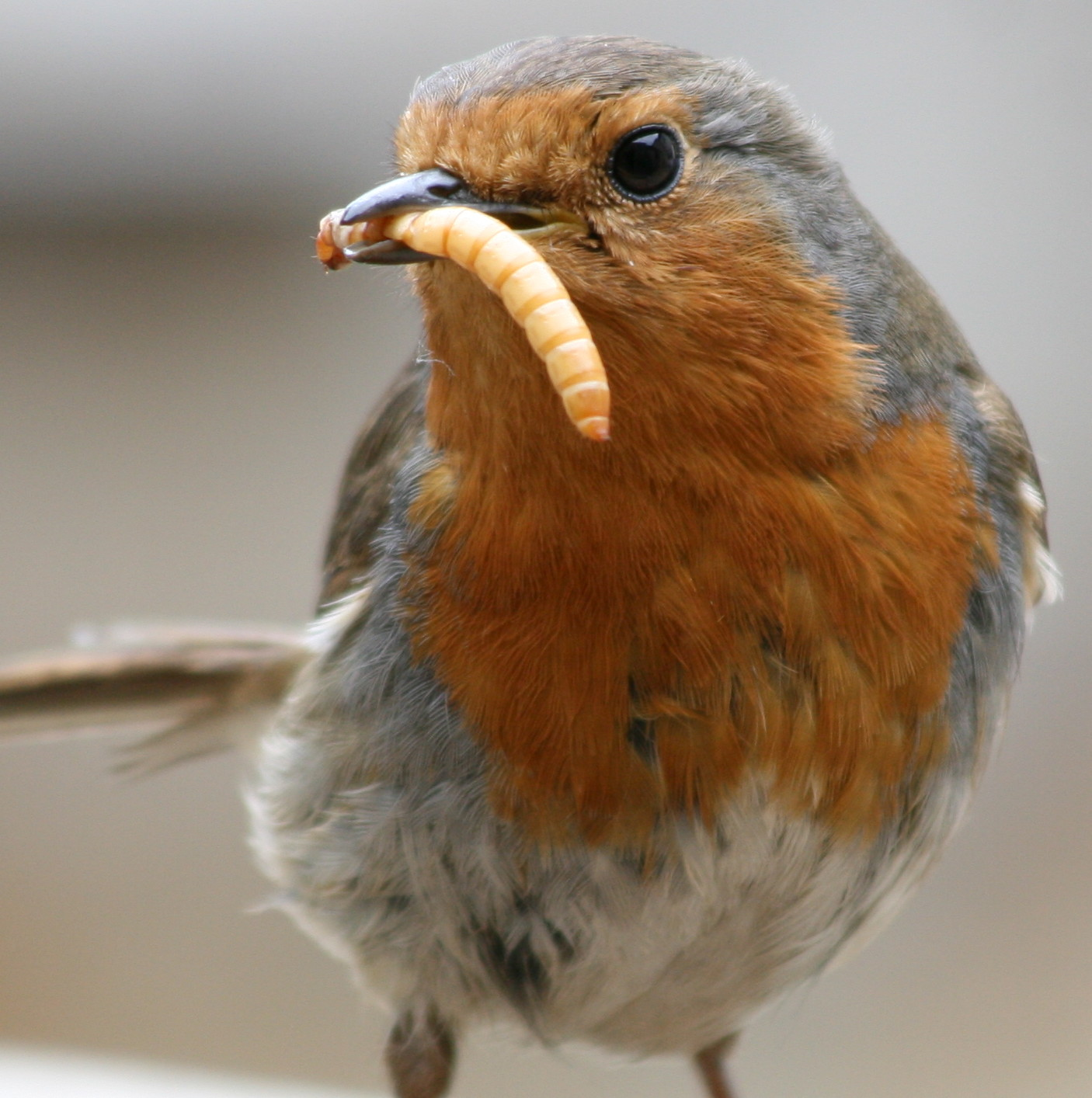
Robin with mealworm

European robin feeding on snowy ground

European robin feeding.

=== Breeding ===
Robins can build nests in a variety of places. In fact, they will consider anything that offers some shelter, such as a depression or a hole. As well as crevices and sheltered banks, they may also use pieces of machinery, barbecues, bicycle handlebars, the bristles of upturned brooms, discarded kettles, watering cans, flower pots and hats. Robins will also nest in manmade nest boxes, favouring a design with an open front placed in a sheltered position up to 2 metres (6 ft 7 in) from the ground. Nests are generally composed of moss, leaves and grass, with fine grass, hair and feathers for lining.

Two or three clutches of five or six eggs are laid throughout the breeding season, which commences in March in Britain and Ireland. The eggs are a cream, buff or white speckled or blotched with reddish-brown colour, often more heavily so at the larger end. When juvenile birds fly from the nests, their colouration is entirely mottled brown. After two to three months out of the nest, the juvenile bird grows some orange feathers under its chin, and over a similar period this patch gradually extends to complete the adult appearance of an entirely red-orange breast.

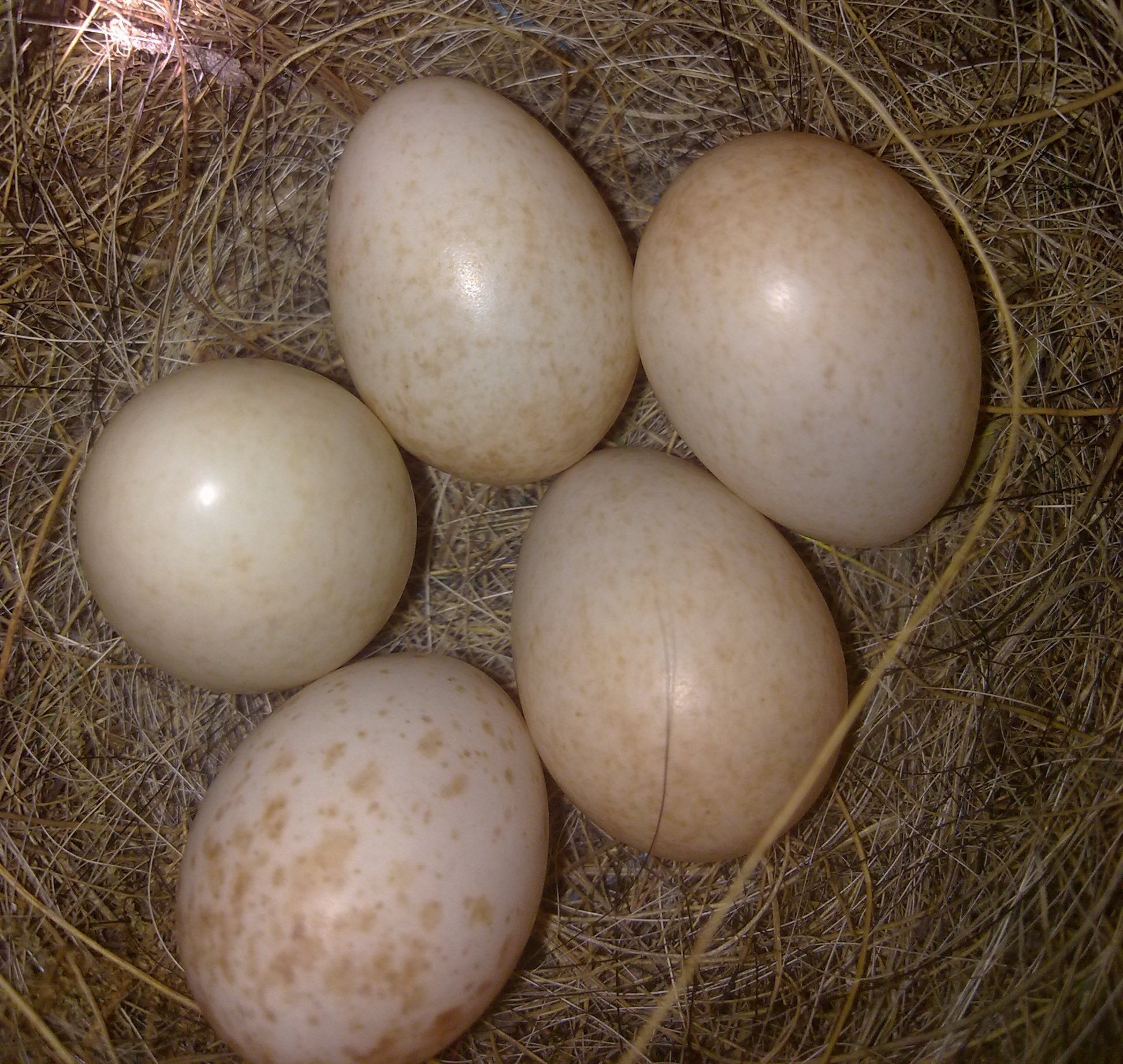
Nest with five eggs

A single egg

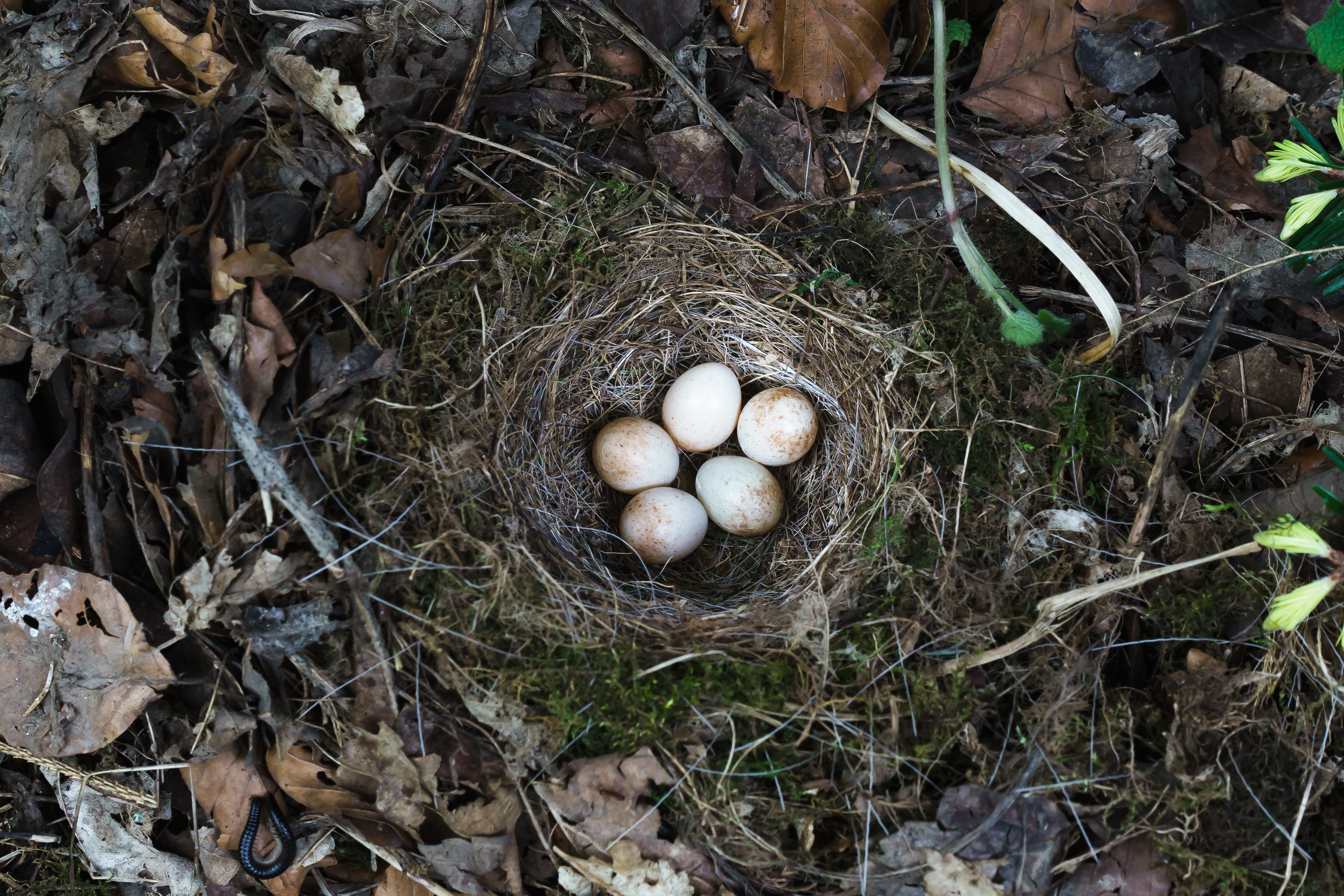
Bird nest of a ground-breeding robin

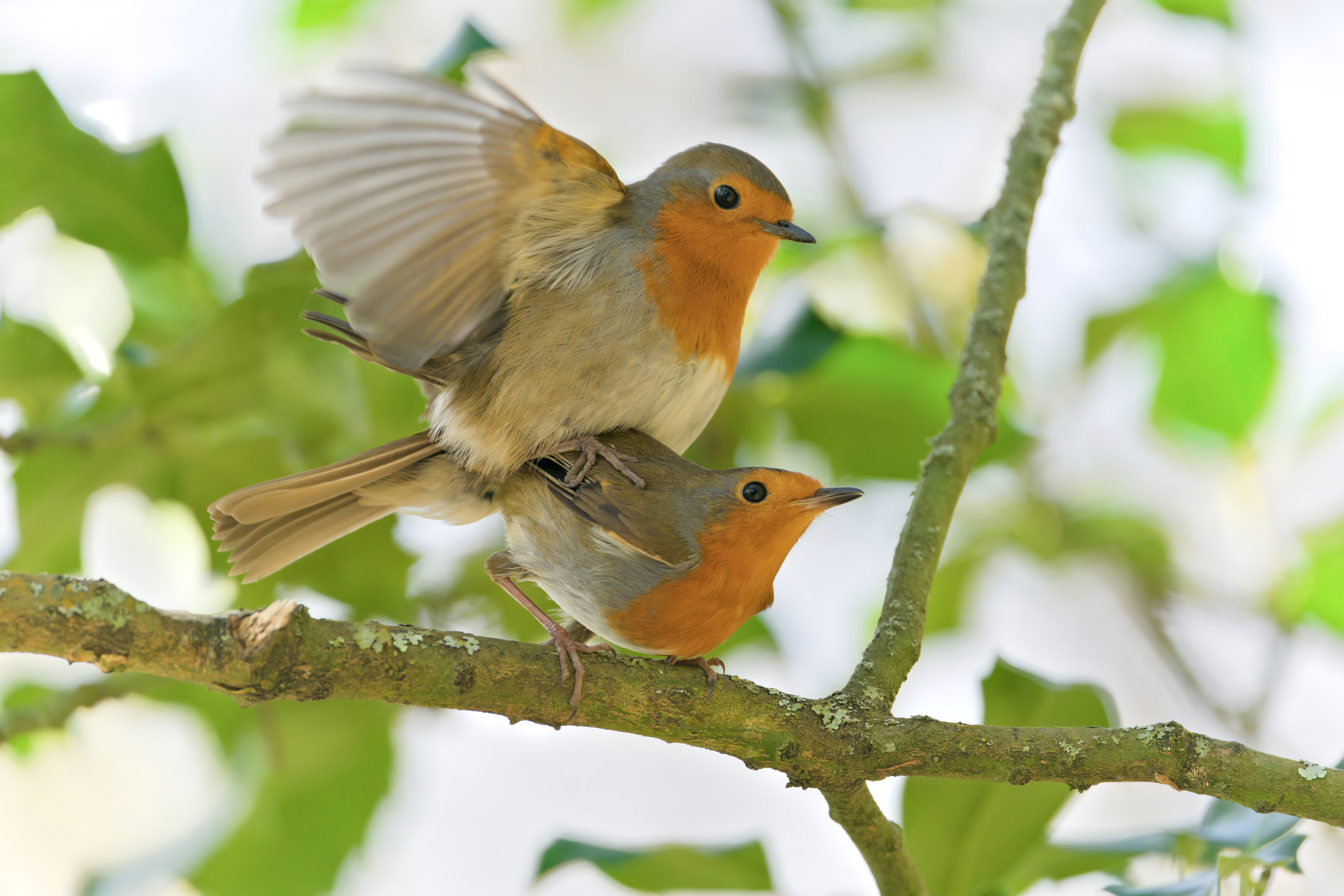
robins mating.

=== Vocalisation ===
European robin
European robin song

The robin produces a fluting, warbling song during the breeding season. Both the male and female sing throughout the year, including during the winter, when they hold separate territories. During the winter, the robin's song is more plaintive than the summer version. The female robin moves a short distance from the summer nesting territory to a nearby area that is more suitable for winter feeding. The male robin keeps the same territory throughout the year. During the breeding season, male robins usually initiate their morning song an hour before civil sunrise, and usually terminate their daily singing around thirty minutes after sunset. Nocturnal singing can also occur, especially in urban areas that are artificially lit during the night. Some urban robins opt to sing at night to avoid daytime anthropogenic noise.

=== Magnetoreception ===
Very weak radio-frequency interference prevents migratory robins from orienting correctly to the Earth's magnetic field. Since this would not interfere with an iron compass, the experiments imply that the birds use a radical-pair mechanism.

The avian magnetic compass of the robin has been extensively researched and uses vision-based magnetoreception, in which the robin's ability to sense the magnetic field of the Earth for navigation is affected by the light entering the bird's eye. The physical mechanism of the robin's magnetic sense involves quantum entanglement of electron spins in cryptochrome in the bird's eyes.

== Conservation status ==
The European robin has an extensive range and a population numbering in the hundreds of millions. The species does not approach the vulnerable thresholds under the population trend criterion (>30 per cent decline over ten years or three generations); the population appears to be increasing. The International Union for Conservation of Nature evaluates it as least concern.

== In European culture ==
The robin features prominently in British folklore and that of northwestern France, but much less so in other parts of Europe, though in the nineteenth century Jacob Grimm reported a tradition from German-speaking Europe that if someone disturbed a robin's nest their house would be struck by lightning. Robins feature in the traditional English children's tale Babes in the Wood; the birds cover the dead bodies of the children.

The robin is a sacred bird in Welsh folklore where it is said to have taken pity on the souls in Hell and decided to scoop water up in its beak and fly down into the "fiery pit" in one tale, to offer the sinners some respite; in another to extinguishing the eternal flames forever. As such, the robin still bears the scorch marks of these fires on its head and chest and is called "Brou-Rhuddyn" (English: "burnt-breast") in the Welsh language today. However the sacred bird could also be seen as a bad omen if they break a house's threshold, sometimes signaling death or illness. In the Welsh coalfields, a robin appearing underground was seen as a harbinger of a catastrophic accident to come.

An old British folk tale seeks to explain the robin's distinctive breast: Legend has it that when Jesus was dying on the cross, the robin, then simply brown in colour, flew to his side and sang into his ear in order to comfort him in his pain; the blood from his wounds stained the robin's breast, and thereafter all robins carry the mark of Christ's blood upon them. (Note: In Christian folklore the robin got its red breast because it plucked a thorn from Jesus' crown-of-thorns during His crucifixion. A drop of Jesus' blood fell on to the bird and thereafter they had a red breast – for Christians the robin has long been associated with charity and piety.) The robin has become strongly associated with Christmas, taking a starring role on many Christmas cards since the mid-19th century. The robin has appeared on many Christmas postage stamps. In the 1960s, in a vote publicised by The Times, the robin was adopted as the unofficial national bird of the United Kingdom. In 2015, the robin was again voted Britain's national bird in a poll organised by birdwatcher David Lindo, taking 34% of the final vote.

Several English and Welsh sports organisations are nicknamed "the Robins". The nickname is typically used for teams whose home colours predominantly use red. These include the professional football clubs Bristol City, Crewe Alexandra, Swindon Town, Cheltenham Town and, traditionally, Wrexham A.F.C., as well as the English rugby league team Hull Kingston Rovers (whose home colours are white with a red band). As of 2019, Bristol City, Swindon Town and Cheltenham Town also incorporate a robin image in their current badge designs. A small bird is an unusual choice, although it is thought to symbolise agility in darting around the field.
