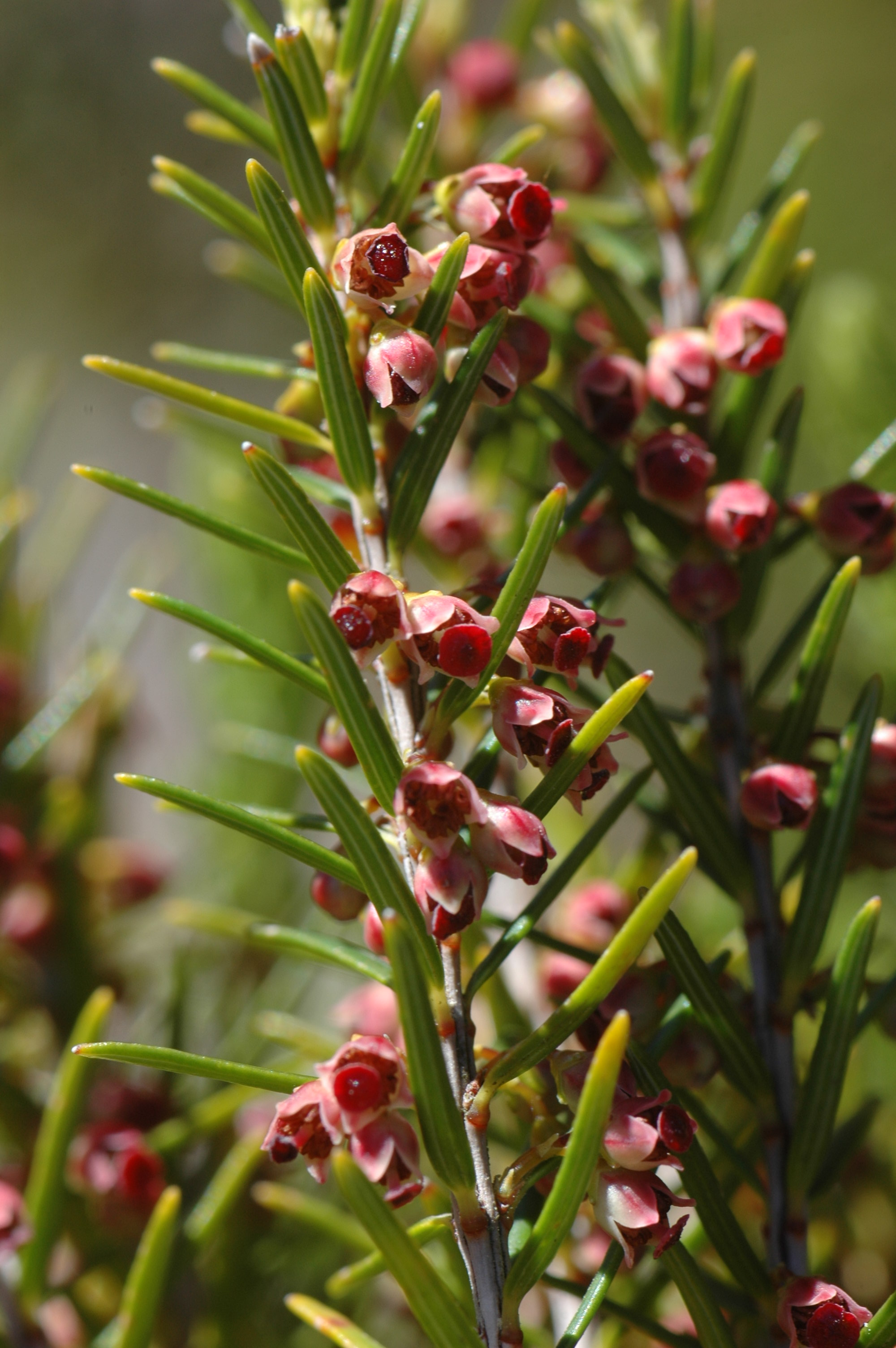

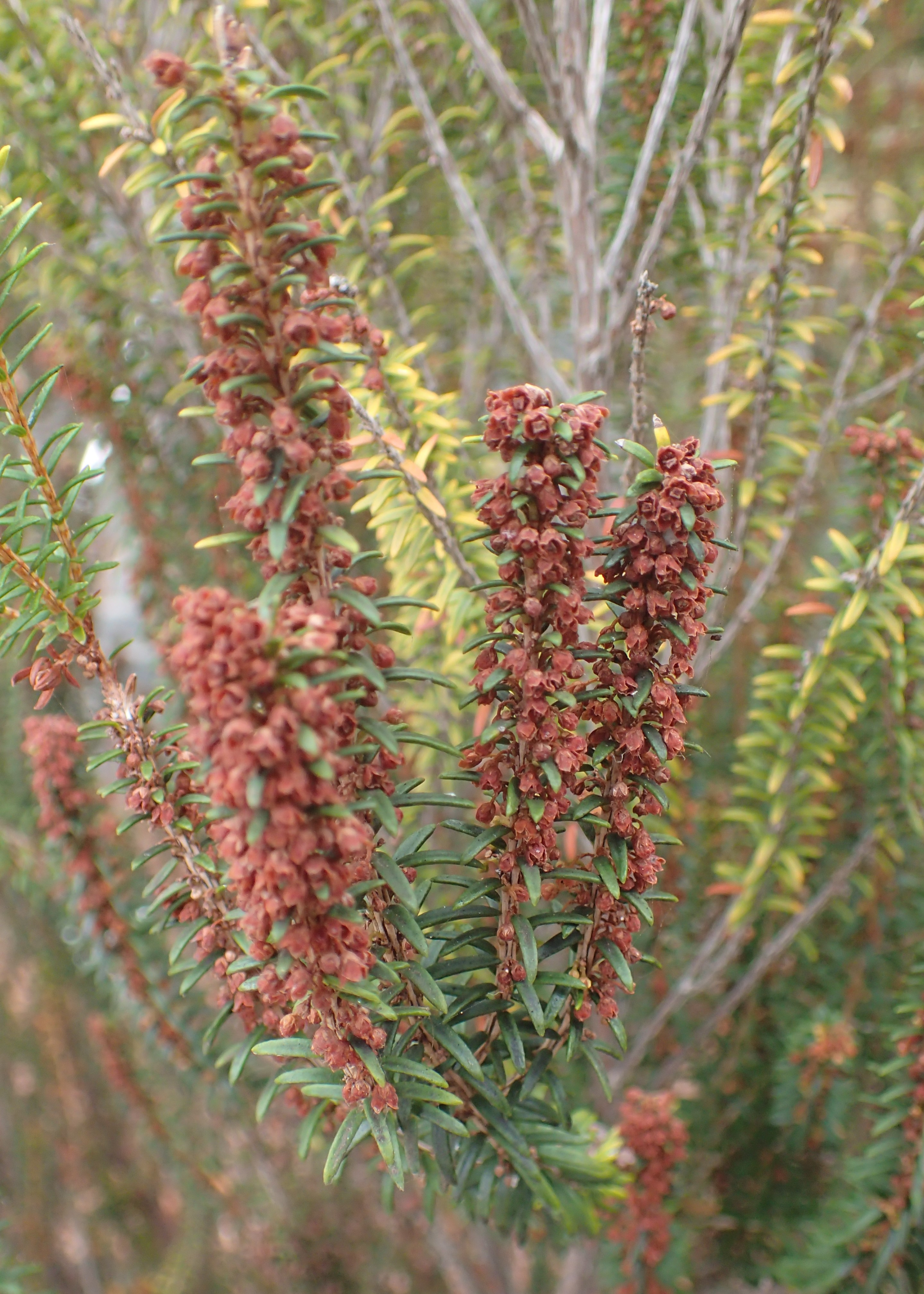

Scientific classification
- Kingdom: Plantae
- Clade: Tracheophytes
- Clade: Angiosperms
- Clade: Eudicots
- Clade: Asterids
- Order: Ericales
- Family: Ericaceae
- Genus: Erica
- Species: E. platycodon

Binomial name
- Erica platycodon (Webb & Berthel.) Rivas Mart. & al.

Synonyms
- Erica scoparia subsp. platycodon (Webb & Berthel.) A.Hansen & G.Kunkel

= Erica platycodon =

Species of flowering plant

Erica platycodon is a plant belonging to the genus Erica. The plant is endemic to the Canary Islands and Madeira.

It also has a subspecies: Erica platycodon subsp. maderincola.
