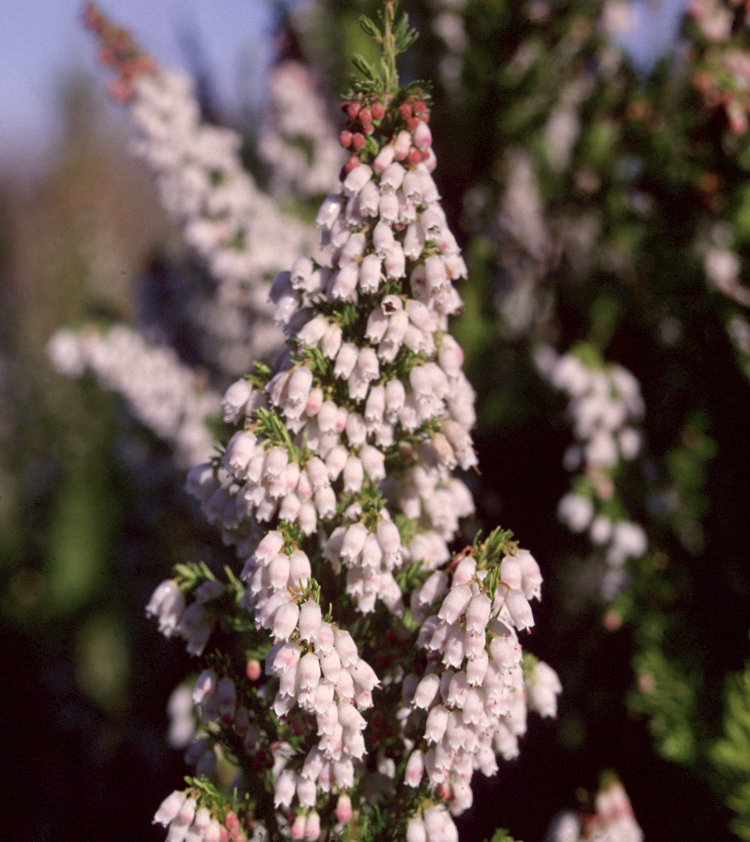

Conservation status
- Least Concern (IUCN 3.1)

Scientific classification
- Kingdom: Plantae
- Clade: Tracheophytes
- Clade: Angiosperms
- Clade: Eudicots
- Clade: Asterids
- Order: Ericales
- Family: Ericaceae
- Genus: Erica
- Species: E. lusitanica

Binomial name
- Erica lusitanica Rudolphi

= Erica lusitanica =

Species of flowering plant

Erica lusitanica is a European species of flowering plant in the family Ericaceae, known by the common names Portuguese heath and Spanish heath.

== Description ==
Erica lusitanica is a hairy, woody shrub just under 2 metres (6 1/2 feet) in maximum height. It is densely covered in plumes of green, leathery, needle-like evergreen leaves each less than a centimeter long. Flowers appear between the leaves, singly or in small clusters, in winter and spring. Each is a hanging rounded tubular bell of fused light pink-to-white petals. The fruit is a capsule a few millimeters long filled with minuscule seeds small enough to disperse on the wind. A single plant can produce millions of seeds per year.

== Etymology ==
It is named for Lusitania, a historical region encompassing most of modern Portugal and parts of western Spain.

== Distribution and habitat ==
It is native to Portugal, Spain and southwestern France.

Garden escapes easily become introduced species and sometimes invasive species—noxious weeds in certain climates. It has naturalised in the British Isles, California, Hawaii, Australia, and New Zealand.

== Cultivation ==
Erica lusitanica is cultivated as an ornamental plant for gardens. Like others of its kind it is a calcifuge and prefers an open, sunny site in acid soil. It is typically seen in the company of other heathers and mixed conifers. It has gained the Royal Horticultural Society's Award of Garden Merit.
